= International relations (1814–1919) =

Diplomacy and wars of six largest powers in the world

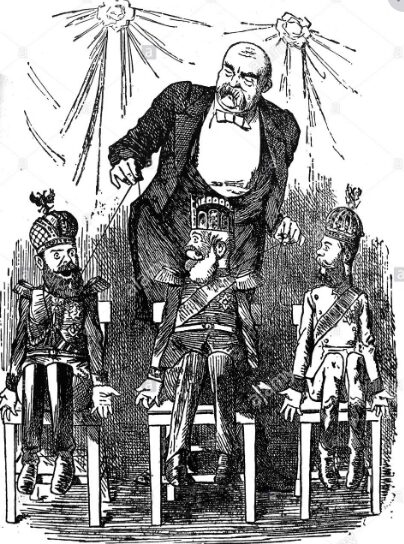
Bismarck manipulates the three emperors – Alexander III of Russia, William I of Germany and Francis Joseph of Austria-Hungary – like a ventriloquist's puppets; John Tenniel 1884 PUNCH.

This article covers worldwide diplomacy and, more generally, the international relations of the great powers from 1814 to 1919. (Note: The international relations of minor countries are covered in their own history articles.) This era covers the period from the end of the Napoleonic Wars and the Congress of Vienna (1814–1815), to the end of the First World War and the Paris Peace Conference (1919–1920).

Important themes include the rapid industrialization and growing power of Great Britain, the United States, France, Prussia/Germany, and, later in the period, by Italy and Japan. This led to imperialist and colonialist competitions for influence and power throughout the world, most famously the Scramble for Africa in the 1880s and 1890s; the reverberations of which are still widespread and consequential in the 21st century. Britain established an informal economic network that, combined with its colonies and its Royal Navy, made it the hegemonic nation until its power was challenged by the united Germany. It was a largely peaceful century, with no wars between the great powers, apart from the 1853–1871 interval, and some wars between Russia and the Ottoman Empire. After 1900, there was a series of wars in the Balkan region, which exploded out of control into World War I (1914–1918) — a massively devastating event that was unexpected in its timing, duration, casualties, and long-term impact.

In 1814, diplomats recognized five great powers: France, Britain, Russia, Austria (in 1867–1918, Austria-Hungary) and Prussia (in 1871–1918, the German Empire). Italy was added to this group after its unification in 1860 ("Risorgimento"); by 1905 two rapidly growing non-European states, Japan and the United States, had joined the great powers. Romania, Bulgaria, Serbia, and Montenegro initially operated as autonomous vassals, for until 1878 and 1908 they were legally still part of the declining Ottoman Empire, before gaining their independence.

In 1914, on the eve of the First World War, there were two major blocs in Europe: the Triple Entente formed by France, Britain, and Russia and the Triple Alliance formed by Germany, Austria-Hungary, and Italy. Italy stayed neutral and joined the Entente in 1915, while the Ottoman Empire and Bulgaria joined the Central Powers. Neutrality was the policy of Belgium, the Netherlands, Luxembourg, Denmark, Sweden, Norway, Greece, Portugal, Spain, and Switzerland. (Note: Denmark, the Netherlands, Spain, Sweden, and Switzerland remained neutral throughout the war.) The First World War unexpectedly pushed the great powers' military, diplomatic, social and economic capabilities to their limits. Germany, Austria–Hungary, the Ottoman Empire, and Bulgaria were defeated; Germany lost its great power status, Bulgaria lost more territory, and the others were broken up into collections of states. The winners Britain, France, Italy and Japan gained permanent seats at the governing council of the new League of Nations. The United States, meant to be the fifth permanent member, decided to operate independently and never joined the League.

For the following periods, see diplomatic history of World War I and international relations (1919–1939).

== 1814–1830: Restoration and reaction ==
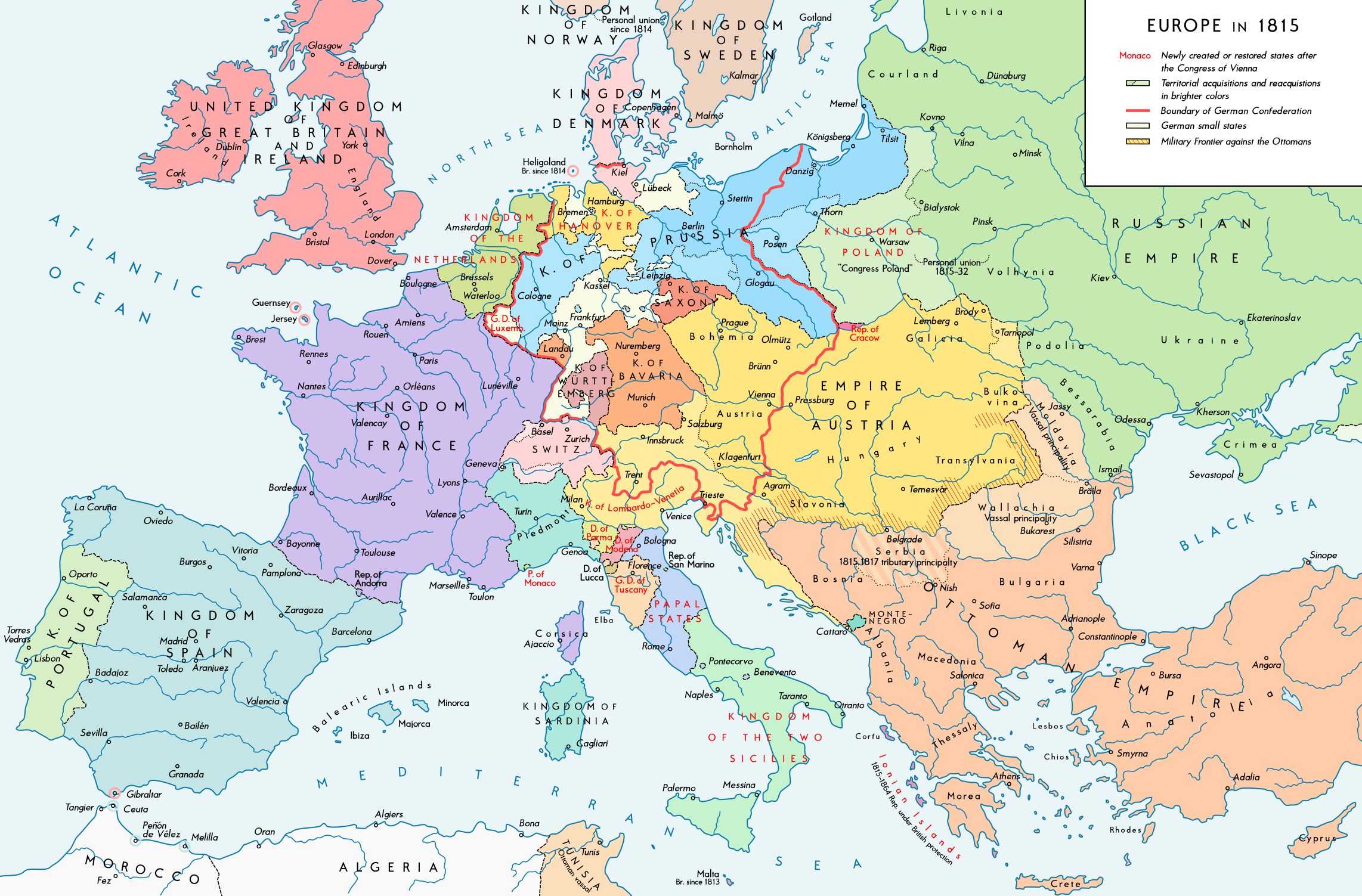
The national boundaries within Europe as set by the Congress of Vienna, 1815

As the four major European powers (Britain, Prussia, Russia, and Austria) opposing the French Empire in the Napoleonic Wars saw Napoleon's power collapsing in 1814, they started planning for the postwar world. The Treaty of Chaumont of March 1814 reaffirmed decisions that had been made already and which would be ratified by the more important Congress of Vienna of 1814–1815. They included the establishment of a German Confederation including both Austria and Prussia (plus the Czech lands), the division of French protectorates and annexations into independent states, the restoration of the Bourbon kings of Spain, the enlargement of the Netherlands to include what in 1830 became modern Belgium, and the continuation of British subsidies to its allies. The Treaty of Chaumont united the powers to defeat Napoleon and became the cornerstone of the Concert of Europe, which formed the balance of power for the next two decades.

One goal of diplomacy throughout the period was to achieve a "balance of power", so that no one or two powers would be dominant. If one power gained an advantage—for example by winning a war and acquiring new territory—its rivals might seek "compensation"—that is, territorial or other gains, even though they were not part of the war in the first place. The bystander might be angry if the winner of the war did not provide enough compensation. For example, in 1866, Prussia and supporting north German States defeated Austria and its southern German allies, but France was angry that it did not get any compensation to balance off the Prussian gains.

=== Congress of Vienna: 1814–1815 ===
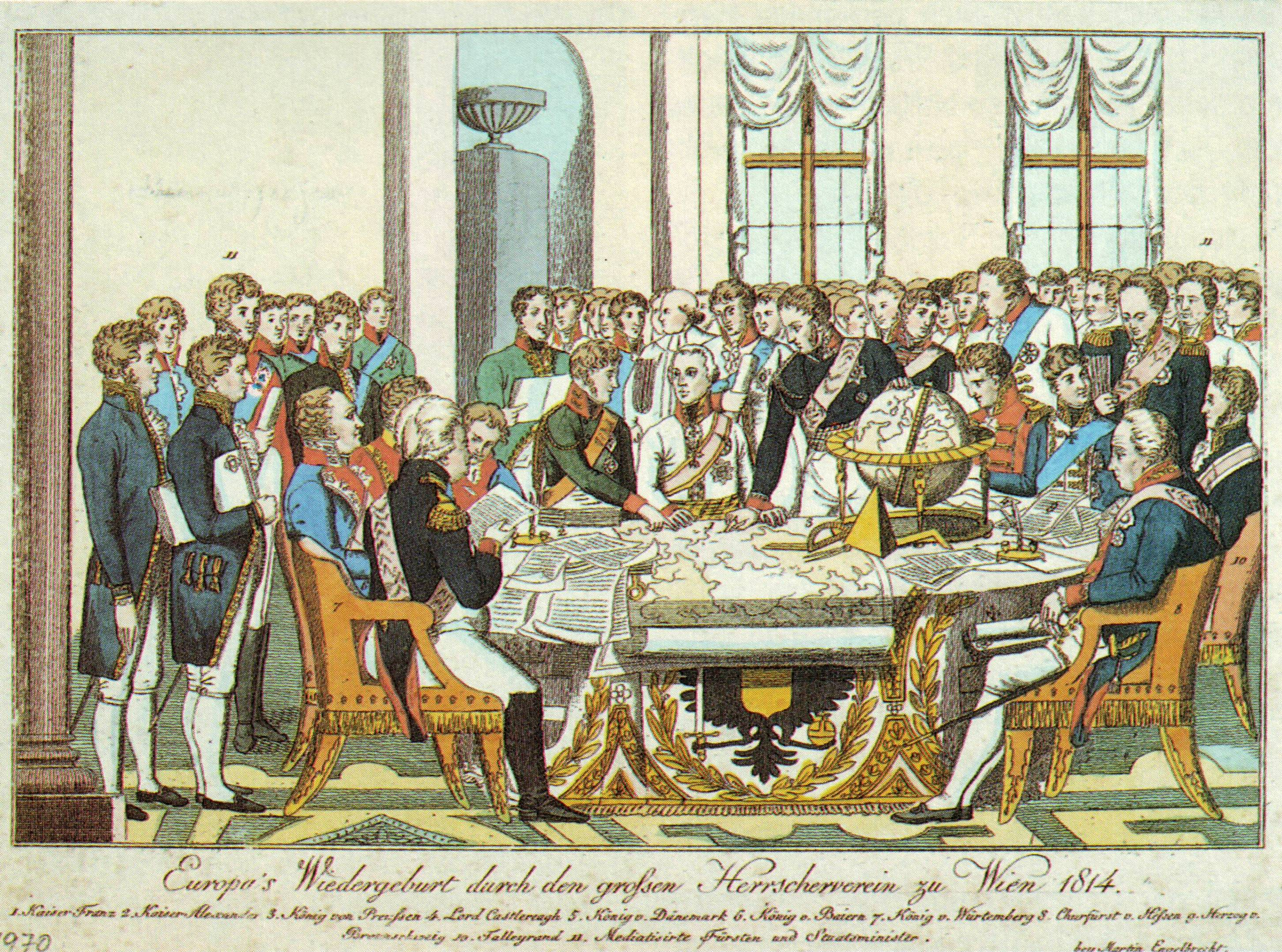
Negotiations at the Congress of Vienna

The Congress of Vienna (1814–1815) dissolved the Napoleonic Wars and attempted to restore the monarchies Napoleon had overthrown, ushering in an era of reaction. Under the leadership of Klemens von Metternich, the chancellor of Austria (1809–1848), and Lord Castlereagh, the foreign minister of Great Britain (1812–1822), the Congress set up a system to preserve the peace. Under the Concert of Europe (or "Congress system"), the major European powers—Britain, Russia, Prussia, Austria, and (after 1818) France—pledged to meet regularly to resolve differences. This plan was the first of its kind in European history and seemed to promise a way to collectively manage European affairs and promote peace. It was the forerunner of the League of Nations and the United Nations. Some historians see the more formal version of the Concert of Europe, constituting the immediate aftermath of the Vienna Congress, as collapsing by 1823, while other historians see the Concert of Europe as persisting through most of the 19th century. Historian Richard Langhorne sees the Concert as governing international relations between the European powers until the formation of Germany in 1871, and Concert mechanisms having a more loose but detectable influence in international politics as late as the outbreak of WWI.

The Congress resolved the Polish–Saxon crisis at Vienna and the question of Greek independence at Laibach (Ljubljana). Three major European congresses took place. The Congress of Aix-la-Chapelle (1818) ended the military occupation of France and adjusted downward the 700 million francs the French were obligated to pay as reparations. Tsar Alexander I of Russia proposed the formation of an entirely new alliance, to include all of the signatories from the Vienna treaties, to guarantee the sovereignty, territorial integrity, and preservation of the ruling governments of all members of this new coalition. The Tsar further proposed an international army, with the Imperial Russian Army as its nucleus, to provide the wherewithal to intervene in any country that needed it. Lord Castlereagh saw this as a highly undesirable commitment to reactionary policies. He recoiled at the idea of Russian armies marching across Europe to put down popular uprisings. Furthermore, to admit all the smaller countries would create intrigue and confusion. Britain refused to participate, so the idea was abandoned.

The other meetings proved meaningless as each nation realized the Congresses were not to their advantage, where disputes were resolved with a diminishing degree of effectiveness.

To achieve lasting peace, the Concert of Europe tried to maintain the balance of power. Until the 1860s the territorial boundaries laid down at the Congress of Vienna were maintained, and even more importantly, there was an acceptance of the theme of balance with no major aggression. Otherwise, the Congress system had "failed" by 1823. In 1818 the British decided not to become involved in continental issues that did not directly affect them. They rejected the plan of Tsar Alexander I to suppress future revolutions. The Concert system fell apart as the common goals of the Great Powers were replaced by growing political and economic rivalries. Artz says the Congress of Verona in 1822 "marked the end". There was no Congress called to restore the old system during the great revolutionary upheavals of 1848 with their demands for revision of the Congress of Vienna's frontiers along national lines. Conservative monarchies formed the nominal Holy Alliance. This alliance fragmented in the 1850s due to crises in the Ottoman Empire, described as the Eastern Question.

=== British policies ===
British foreign policy was set by George Canning (1822–1827), who avoided close cooperation with other powers. Britain, with its unchallenged Royal Navy and increasing financial wealth and industrial strength, built its foreign policy on the principle that no state should be allowed to dominate the Continent. It wanted to support the Ottoman Empire as a bulwark against Russian expansionism. It opposed interventions designed to suppress liberal democracy, and was especially worried that France and Spain planned to suppress the independence movement underway in Latin America. Canning cooperated with the United States to promulgate the Monroe Doctrine to preserve newly independent Latin American states. His goal was to prevent French dominance and allow British merchants access to the opening markets.

=== Abolition of the international slave trade ===
An important liberal advance was the abolition of the international slave trade. It began with legislation in Britain and the United States in 1807, which was increasingly enforced over subsequent decades by the British Royal Navy patrols around Africa. Britain negotiated treaties, or coerced, other nations into agreeing. The result was a reduction of over 95% in the volume of the slave trade from Africa to the New World. About 1000 slaves a year were illegally brought into the United States, as well as some to Spanish Cuba and the Empire of Brazil. Slavery was abolished in the British Empire in 1833, the French Republic in 1848, the United States in 1865, and Brazil in 1888.

=== Spain loses its colonies ===
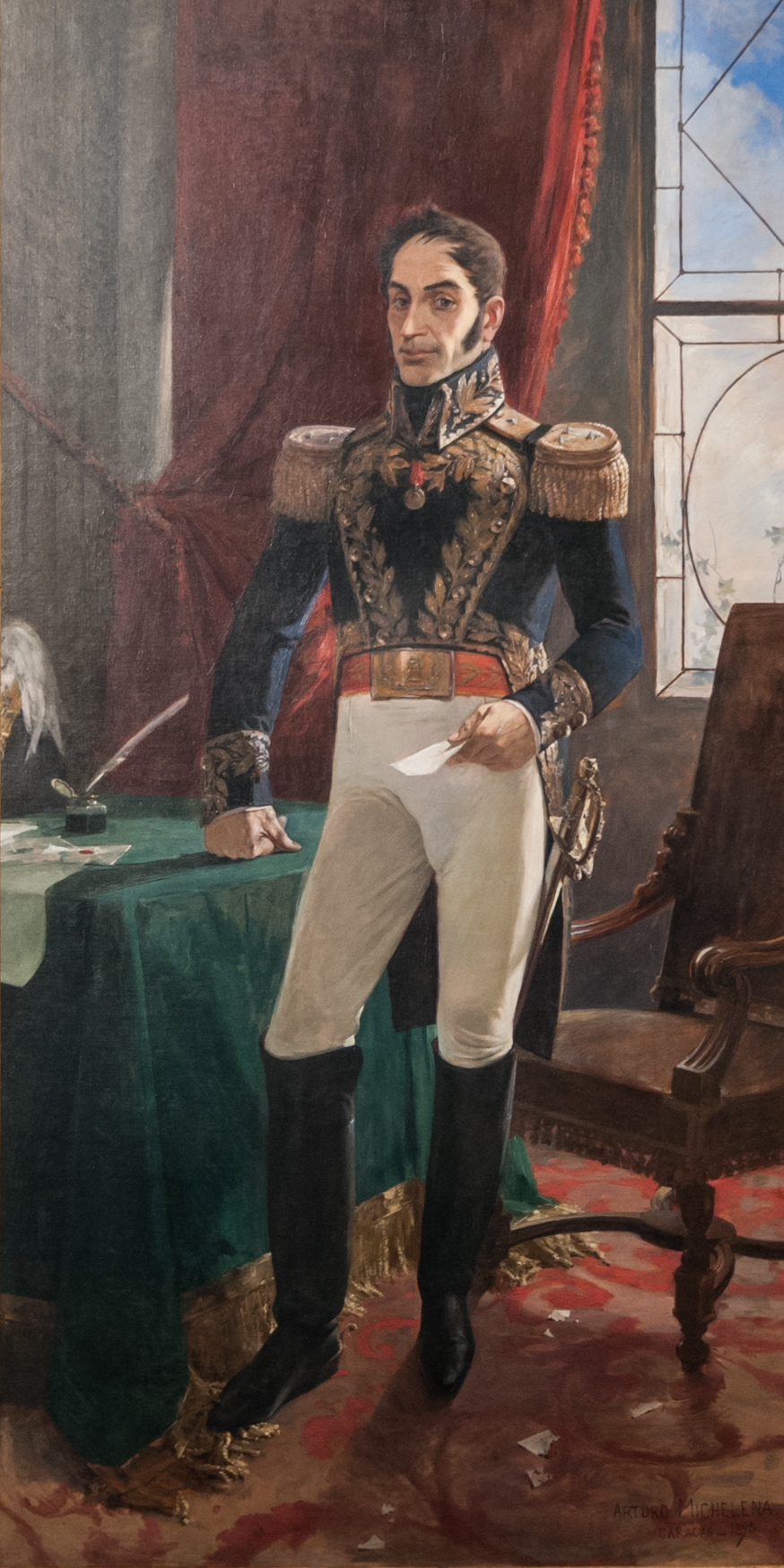
General Simón Bolívar, (1783–1830), a leader of independence in Latin America

Spain was at war with Britain from 1798 to 1808, and the British Royal Navy cut off Spain's contacts with its colonies. Trade was handled by neutral American and Dutch traders. The colonies set up temporary governments or juntas which were effectively independent from the Spanish Empire. The division exploded between Spaniards who were born in Spain (called peninsulares) versus those of Spanish descent born in New Spain (called criollos in Spanish or "creoles" in English). The two groups wrestled for power, with the criollos leading the call for independence and eventually winning that independence. Spain lost all of its American colonies, except Cuba and Puerto Rico, in a complex series of revolts from 1808 to 1826.

Multiple revolutions in Latin America allowed the region to break free of the mother country. Repeated attempts to regain control failed, as Spain had no help from European powers. Indeed, Britain and the United States worked against Spain, enforcing the Monroe Doctrine. British merchants and bankers took a dominant role in Latin America. In 1824, the armies of generals José de San Martín of Argentina and Simón Bolívar of Venezuela defeated the last Spanish forces; the final defeat came at the Battle of Ayacucho in southern Peru.

After the loss of its colonies, Spain played a minor role in international affairs. Spain kept Cuba, which repeatedly revolted in three wars of independence, culminating in the Cuban War of Independence. The United States demanded reforms from Spain, which Spain refused. The U.S. intervened by war in 1898. Winning easily, the U.S. took Cuba and gave it partial independence. The U.S. also took the Spanish colonies of the Philippines and Guam. Though it still had small colonial holdings in North Africa and Equatorial Guinea, Spain's role in international affairs was essentially over.

=== Greek independence: 1821–1833 ===
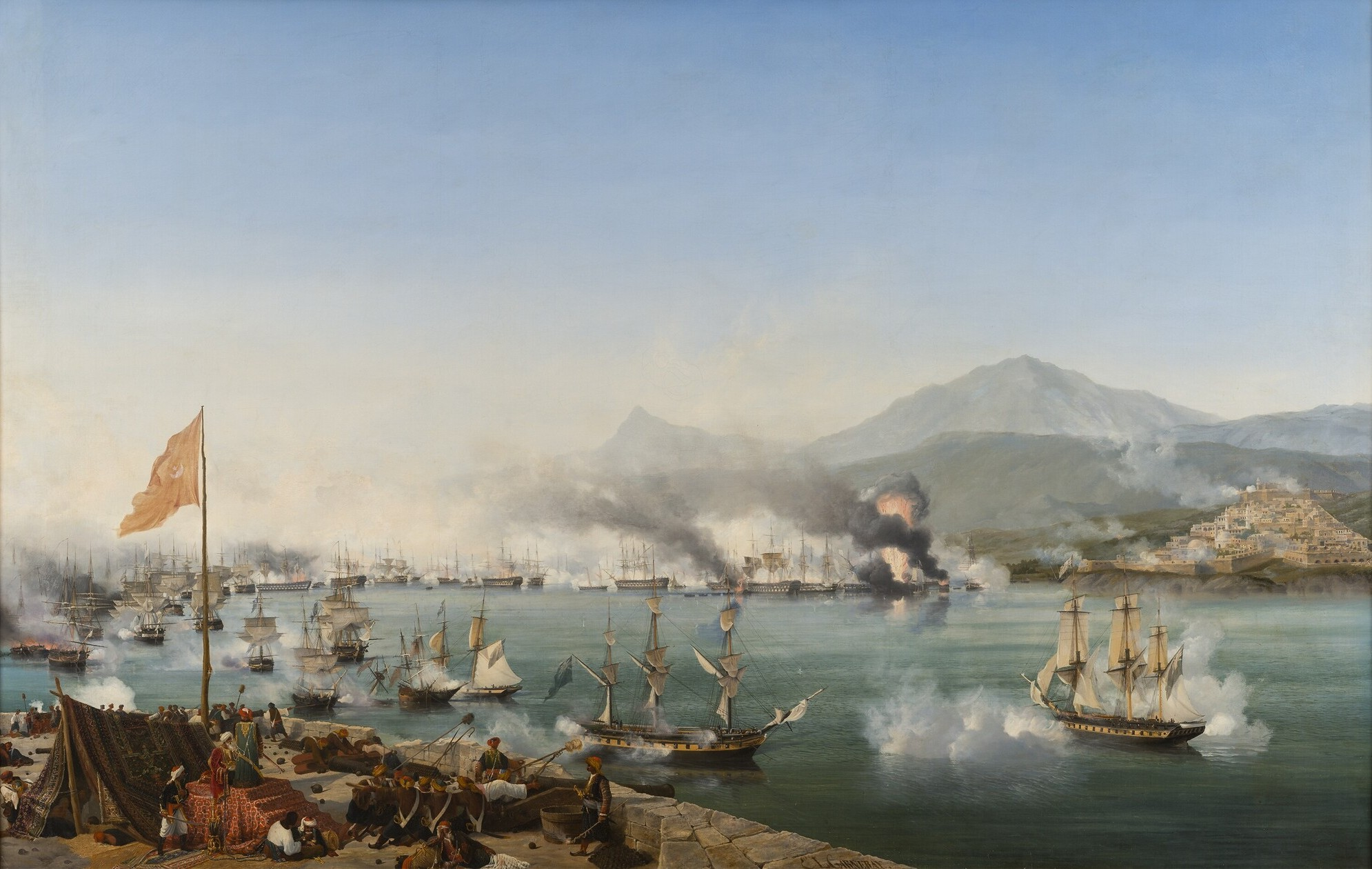
Allied victory at Navarino (1827)

The territorial evolution of Greece since its independence in 1832 until 1947

The Greek War of Independence was the major military conflict in the 1820s. The Great Powers supported the Greeks, but did not want the Ottoman Empire destroyed. Greece was initially to be an autonomous state under Ottoman suzerainty, but by 1832, in the Treaty of Constantinople, it was recognized as a fully independent kingdom.

After some initial success the Greek rebels were beset by internal disputes. The Ottomans, with major aid from Egypt, cruelly crushed the rebellion and harshly punished the Greeks. Humanitarian concerns in Europe were outraged, as typified by English poet Lord Byron. The context of the three Great Powers' intervention was Russia's long-running expansion at the expense of the decaying Ottoman Empire. However Russia's ambitions in the region were seen as a major geostrategic threat by the other European powers. Austria feared the disintegration of the Ottoman Empire would destabilize its southern borders. Russia gave strong emotional support for the fellow Orthodox Christian Greeks. The British were motivated by strong public support for the Greeks. Fearing unilateral Russian action in support of the Greeks, Britain and France bound Russia by treaty to a joint intervention which aimed to secure Greek autonomy whilst preserving Ottoman territorial integrity as a check on Russia.

The Powers agreed, by the Treaty of London (1827), to force the Ottoman government to grant the Greeks autonomy within the empire and despatched naval squadrons to Greece to enforce their policy. The decisive Allied naval victory at the Battle of Navarino broke the military power of the Ottomans and their Egyptian allies. Victory saved the fledgling Greek Republic from collapse. But it required two more military interventions, by Russia in the form of the Russo-Turkish War of 1828–29 and by a French expeditionary force to the Peloponnese to force the withdrawal of Ottoman forces from central and southern Greece and to finally secure Greek independence.

== Travel, trade, and communications ==
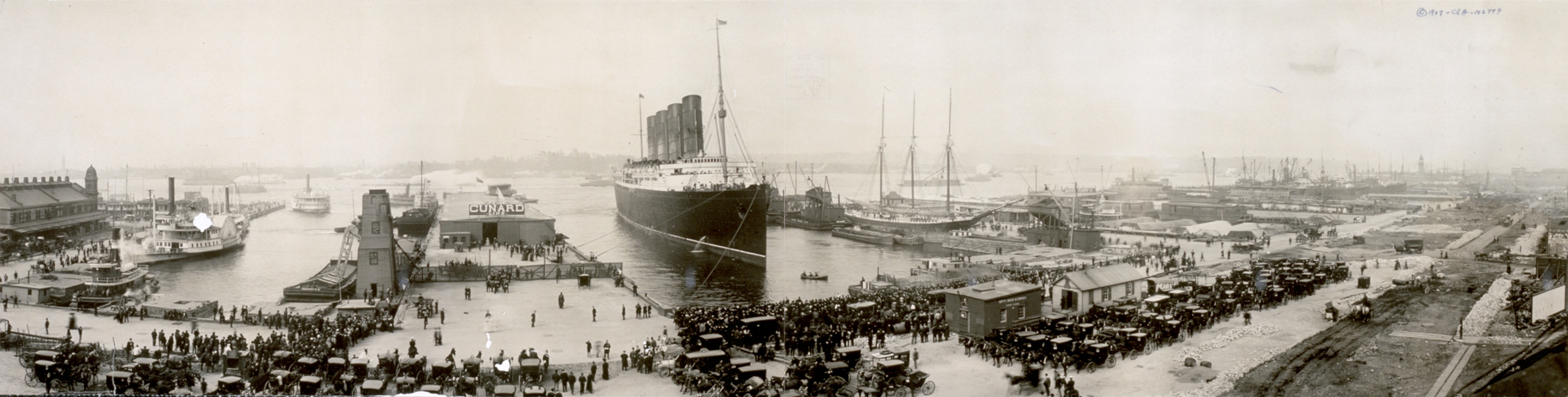
RMS Lusitania arriving in New York from Liverpool, England, in 1907. As the primary means of trans-oceanic voyages for over a century, ocean liners handled the travel needs of businessmen, immigrants and tourists.

The world became much smaller as long-distance travel and communications improved dramatically. Every decade there were more ships, more scheduled destinations, faster trips, and lower fares for passengers and cheaper rates for merchandise. This facilitated international trade and international organization. After 1860, the enormous expansion of wheat production in the United States flooded the world market, lowering prices by 40%, and (along with the expansion of local potato farming) made a major contribution to the nutritional welfare of the poor.

=== Travel ===
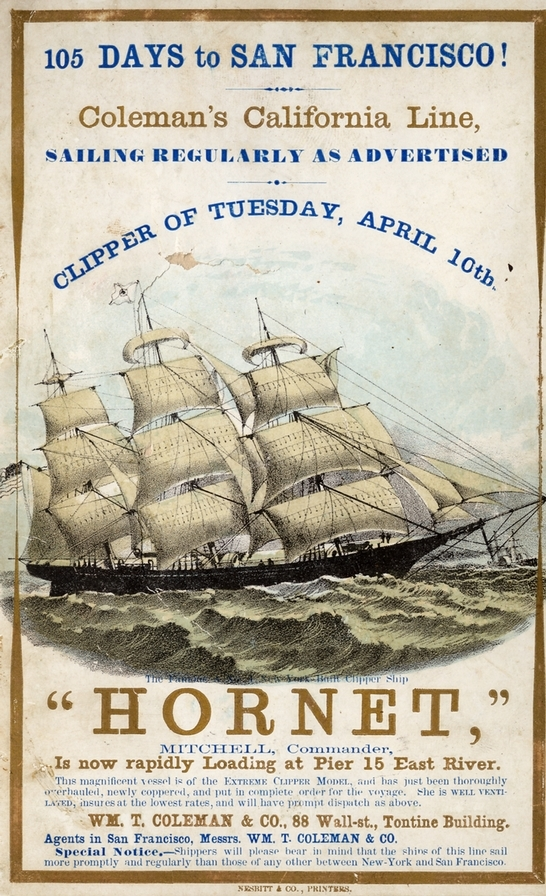
Hornet – an American clipper ship of the 1850s

Underwater telegraph cables linked the world's major trading nations by the 1860s.

Cargo sailing ships were slow; the average speed of all long-distance Mediterranean voyages to Palestine was only 2.8 knots. Passenger ships achieved greater speed by sacrificing cargo space. The sailing ship records were held by the clipper, a very fast sailing ship of the 1843–1869 era. Clippers were narrow for their length, could carry limited bulk freight, small by later 19th-century standards, and had a large total sail area. Their average speed was six knots and they carried passengers across the globe, primarily on the trade routes between Britain and its colonies in the east, in trans-Atlantic trade, and the New York-to-San Francisco route round Cape Horn during the California Gold Rush. The much faster steam-powered, iron-hulled ocean liner became the dominant mode of passenger transportation from the 1850s to the 1950s. It used coal—and needed many coaling stations. After 1900 oil replaced coal and did not require frequent refueling.

=== Transportation ===
Freight rates on ocean traffic held steady in the 18th century down to about 1840, and then began a rapid downward plunge. The British dominated world exports, and rates for British freight fell 70% from 1840 to 1910. The Suez Canal cut the shipping time from London to India by a third when it opened in 1869. The same ship could make more voyages in a year, so it could charge less and carry more goods every year.

Technological innovation was steady. Iron hulls replaced wood by mid-century; after 1870, steel replaced iron. It took much longer for steam engines to replace sails. Note the sailing ship across from the Lusitania in the photograph above. Wind was free, and could move the ship at an average speed of 2–3 knots, unless it was becalmed. Coal was expensive and required coaling stations along the route. A common solution was for a merchant ship to rely mostly on its sails, and only use the steam engine as a backup. The first steam engines were very inefficient, using a great deal of coal. For an ocean voyage in the 1860s, half of the cargo space was given over to coal. The problem was especially acute for warships, because their combat range using coal was strictly limited. Only the British Empire had a network of coaling stations that permitted a global scope for the Royal Navy. Steady improvement gave high-powered compound engines which were much more efficient. The boilers and pistons were built of steel, which could handle much higher pressures than iron. They were first used for high-priority cargo, such as mail and passengers. The arrival of the steam turbine engine around 1907 dramatically improved efficiency, and the increasing use of oil after 1910 meant far less cargo space had to be devoted to the fuel supply.

=== Communications ===
By the 1850s, railways and telegraph lines connected all the major cities inside Western Europe, as well as those inside the United States. Instead of greatly reducing the need for travel, the telegraph made travel easier to plan and replaced the slow long-distance mail service. Submarine cables were laid to link the continents by telegraph, which was a reality by the 1860s.

== 1830–1850s ==
Britain continued as the most important power, followed by Russia, France, Prussia, and Austria. The United States was growing rapidly in size, population and economic strength, especially after its defeat of Mexico in 1848. While the U.S. was generally successful in its efforts to avoid international entanglements, the slavery issue became more and more internally divisive.

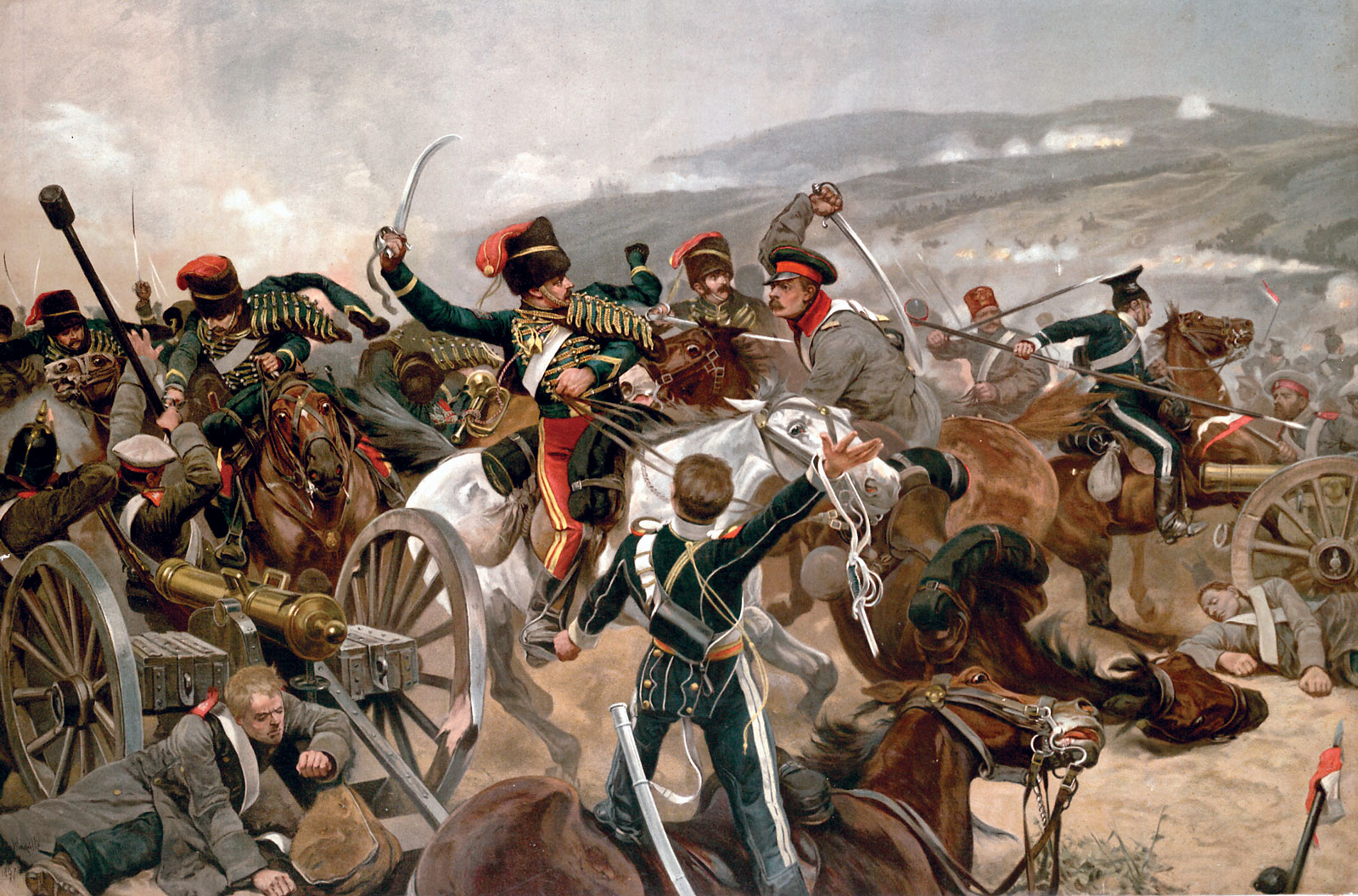
British cavalry charging against Russian forces at Balaclava, 1854

The Crimean War (1853–1856) was the only large scale conflict between major powers during this time frame. It became notorious for its very high casualties and very small impact in the long run. Britain strengthened its colonial system, especially in the British Raj (India), while France rebuilt its colonies in Asia and North Africa. Russia continued its expansion south (toward Persia) and east (into Siberia). The Ottoman Empire steadily weakened, losing control in parts of the Balkans to the new states of Greece and Serbia.

In the Treaty of London, signed in 1839, the Great Powers guaranteed the neutrality of Belgium. Its importance came to a head in 1914 when Germany invaded Belgium in an attempt to outflank and defeat the French. The Germans dismissed the agreement (which predated the formation of Imperial Germany) as a "scrap of paper" in defiance of a British ultimatum to withdraw from Belgium soil immediately leading the United Kingdom to declare war on Germany.

=== British policies ===
Britain's repeal in 1846 of the tariff on food imports, called the Corn Laws, marked a major turning point that made free trade the national policy of Great Britain into the 20th century. Repeal demonstrated the power of "Manchester-school" industrial interests over protectionist agricultural interests.

From 1830 to 1865, with a few interruptions, Lord Palmerston set British foreign policy. He had six main goals that he pursued: first, he defended British interests whenever they seemed threatened, and upheld Britain's prestige abroad. Second, he was a master at using the media to win public support from all ranks of society. Third, he promoted the spread of constitutional Liberal governments like in Britain, along the model of the 1832 Reform Act. He therefore welcomed liberal revolutions as in France (1830), and Greece (1843). Fourth, he promoted British nationalism, looking for advantages for his nation as in the Belgian revolt of 1830 and the Italian unification of 1861. He avoided wars, and operated with only a very small British Army. He felt the best way to promote peace was to maintain a balance of power to prevent any nation—especially France or Russia—from dominating Europe.

Palmerston cooperated with France when necessary for the balance of power, but did not make permanent alliances with anyone. He tried to keep autocratic nations like Russia and Austria in check; he supported liberal regimes because they led to greater stability in the international system. However he also supported the autocratic Ottoman Empire because it blocked Russian expansion. Second in importance to Palmerston was Lord Aberdeen, a diplomat, foreign minister and prime minister. Before the Crimean War debacle that ended his career he scored numerous diplomatic triumphs, starting in 1813–1814 when as ambassador to the Austrian Empire he negotiated the alliances and financing that led to the defeat of Napoleon. In Paris he normalized relations with the newly restored Bourbon government and convinced his government they could be trusted. He worked well with top European diplomats such as his friends Klemens von Metternich in Vienna and François Guizot in Paris. He brought Britain into the center of Continental diplomacy on critical issues, such as the local wars in Greece, Portugal and Belgium. Simmering troubles with the United States were ended by compromising the border dispute in Maine that gave most of the land to the Americans but gave Canada a strategically important link to a warm water port. Aberdeen played a central role in provoking and winning the Opium Wars against China, gaining control of Hong Kong in the process.

=== Belgian Revolution ===
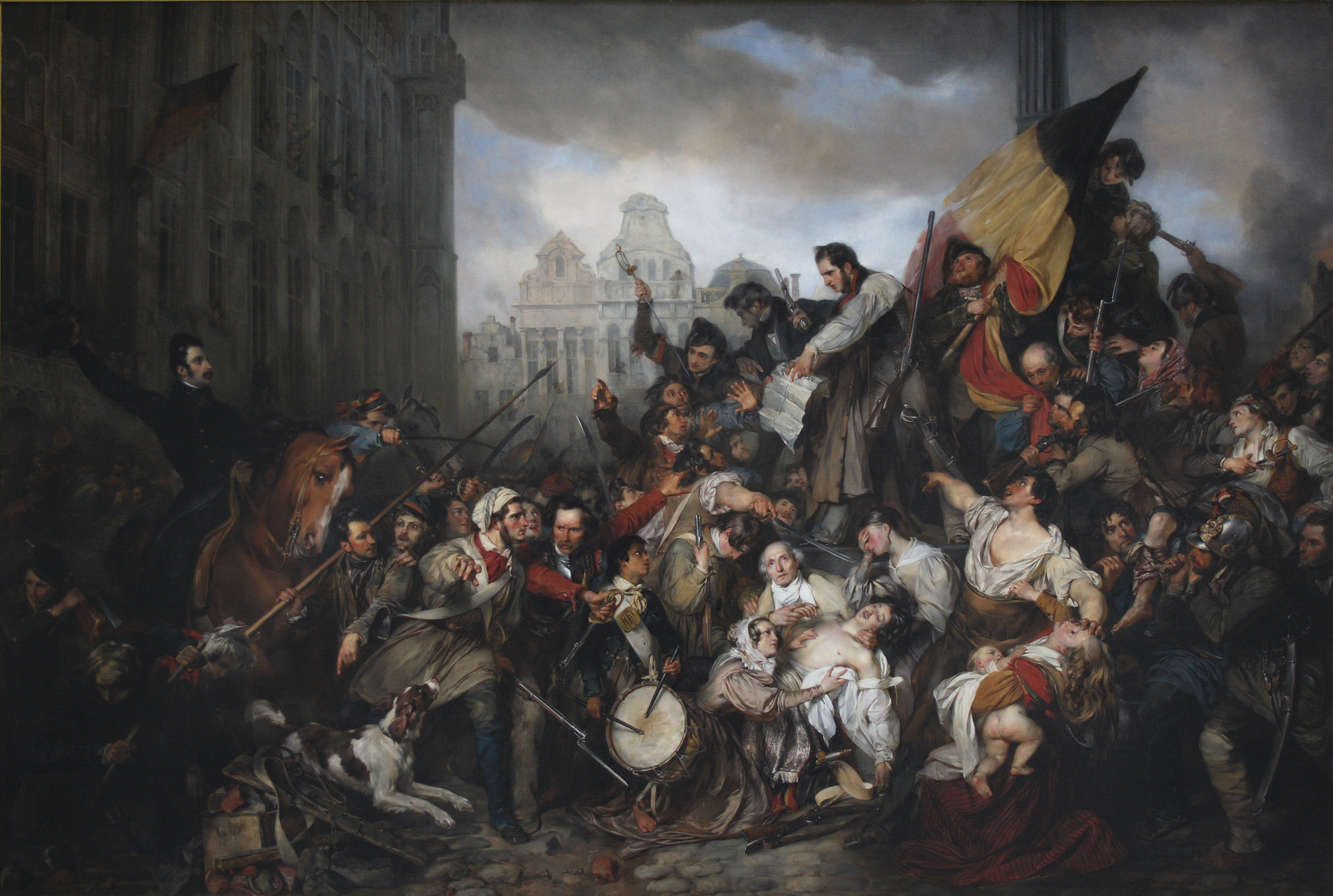
Episode of the Belgian Revolution of 1830, by Gustaf Wappers (1834)

Catholic Belgium in 1830 broke away from the Protestantism of United Kingdom of the Netherlands and established an independent Kingdom of Belgium. Southern liberals and Catholics (mostly French speaking) united against King William I's autocratic rule and efforts to put Dutch education on equal standing with French (in the Southern parts of the kingdom). There were high levels of unemployment and industrial unrest among the working classes. There was small-scale fighting but it took years before the Netherlands finally recognized defeat. In 1839 the Dutch accepted Belgian independence by signing the Treaty of London. The major powers guaranteed Belgian independence.

=== Revolutions of 1848 ===
The Revolutions of 1848 were a series of uncoordinated political upheavals throughout Europe in 1848. They attempted to overthrow reactionary monarchies. This was the most widespread revolutionary wave in European history. It reached most of Europe, but much less forceful in the Americas, Britain and Belgium, where liberalism was recently established. However the reactionary forces prevailed, especially with Russian help, and many rebels went into exile. There were some social reforms.

The revolutions were essentially liberal democratic in nature, with the aim of removing the old monarchical structures and creating independent nation states. The revolutions spread across Europe after an initial revolution began in France in February. Over 50 countries were affected. Liberal ideas had been in the air for a decade and activists from each country drew from the common pool, but they did not form direct links with revolutionaries in nearby countries.

Key contributing factors were widespread dissatisfaction with old established political leadership, demands for more participation in government and democracy, demands for freedom of the press, other demands made by the working class, the upsurge of nationalism, and the regrouping of established government forces. Liberalism at this time meant the replacement of autocratic governments by constitutional states under the rule of law. It had become the creed of the bourgeoisie, but they were not in power. It was the main factor in France. The main factor in the German, Italian and Austrian states was nationalism. Stimulated by the Romantic movement, nationalism had aroused numerous ethnic/language groups in their common past. Germans and Italians lived under multiple governments and demanded to be united in their own national state. Regarding the Austrian Empire, the many ethnicities suppressed by foreign rule—especially Hungarians—fought for a revolution.

The uprisings were led by temporary coalitions of reformers, the middle classes and workers, which did not hold together for long. The start was in France, where large crowds forced King Louis Philippe I to abdicate. Across Europe came the sudden realization that it was indeed possible to destroy a monarchy. Tens of thousands of people were killed, and many more were forced into exile. Significant lasting reforms included the abolition of serfdom in Austria and Hungary, the end of absolute monarchy in Denmark, and the introduction of representative democracy in the Netherlands. The revolutions were most important in France, the Netherlands, the states of the German Confederation, Italy, and the Austrian Empire.

Reactionary forces ultimately prevailed, aided by Russian military intervention in Hungary, and the strong traditional aristocracies and established churches. The revolutionary surge was sudden and unexpected, catching the traditional forces unprepared. But the revolutionaries were also unprepared – they had no plans on how to hold power when it was suddenly in their hands, and bickered endlessly. Reaction came much more gradually, but the aristocrats had the advantages of vast wealth, large networks of contacts, many subservient subjects, and the specific goal in mind of returning to the old status quo.

=== Ottoman Empire ===
The Ottoman Empire was only briefly involved in the Napoleonic Wars through the French campaign in Egypt and Syria, 1798–1801. It was not invited to the Vienna Conference. During this period the Empire steadily weakened militarily, and lost most of its holdings in Europe (starting with Greece) and in North Africa (starting with Egypt). Its greatest enemy was Russia, while its chief supporter was Britain.

As the 19th century progressed the Ottoman Empire grew weaker militarily and economically. It lost more and more control over local governments especially in Europe. It started borrowing large sums and went bankrupt in 1875. Britain increasingly became its chief ally and protector, even fighting the Crimean War against Russia in the 1850s to help it survive. Three British leaders played major roles. Lord Palmerston, who in the 1830–1865 era considered the Ottoman Empire an essential component in the balance of power, was the most favourable toward Constantinople. William Gladstone in the 1870s sought to build a Concert of Europe that would support the survival of the empire. In the 1880s and 1890s Lord Salisbury contemplated an orderly dismemberment of it, in such a way as to reduce rivalry between the greater powers. The Berlin Conference on Africa of 1884 was, except for the abortive Hague Conference of 1899, the last great international political summit before 1914. Gladstone stood alone in advocating concerted instead of individual action regarding the internal administration of Egypt, the reform of the Ottoman Empire, and the opening-up of Africa. Bismarck and Lord Salisbury rejected Gladstone's position and were more representative of the consensus.

==== Serbian independence ====
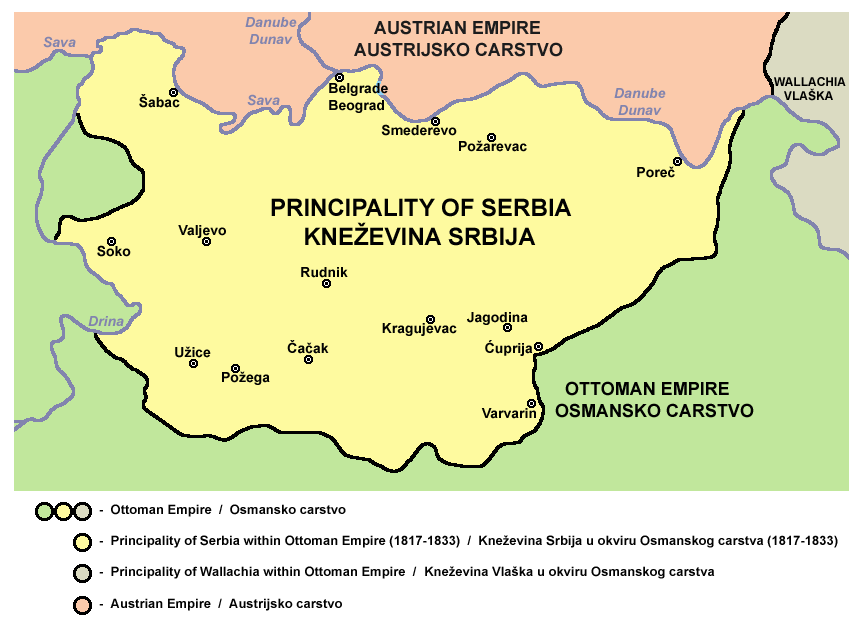
The Principality of Serbia in 1817

A successful uprising against the Ottomans marked the foundation of modern Serbia. The Serbian Revolution took place between 1804 and 1835, as this territory evolved from an Ottoman province into a constitutional monarchy and a modern Serbia. The first part of the period, from 1804 to 1815, was marked by a violent struggle for independence with two armed uprisings. The later period (1815–1835) witnessed a peaceful consolidation of political power of the increasingly autonomous Serbia, culminating in the recognition of the right to hereditary rule by Serbian princes in 1830 and 1833 and the territorial expansion of the young monarchy. The adoption of the first written Constitution in 1835 abolished feudalism and serfdom.

==== Crimean War ====
The Crimean War (1853–1856) was fought between Russia on the one hand and an alliance of Great Britain, France, Sardinia, and the Ottoman Empire on the other. Russia was defeated.

In 1851, France under President Louis-Napoleon Bonaparte compelled the Sublime Porte (the Ottoman government) to recognize it as the protector of Christian sites in the Holy Land. Russia denounced this claim, since it claimed to be the protector of all Eastern Orthodox Christians in the Ottoman Empire. France sent its fleet to the Black Sea; Russia responded with its own show of force. In 1853, Russia sent troops into the Danubian Principalities of Moldavia and Wallachia. Britain, now fearing for the security of the Ottoman Empire, sent a fleet to join with the French expecting the Russians would back down. Diplomatic efforts failed. The Sultan declared war against Russia in October 1853. Following an Ottoman naval disaster in November, Britain and France declared war against Russia. Most of the battles took place in the Crimean peninsula, which the Allies finally seized.

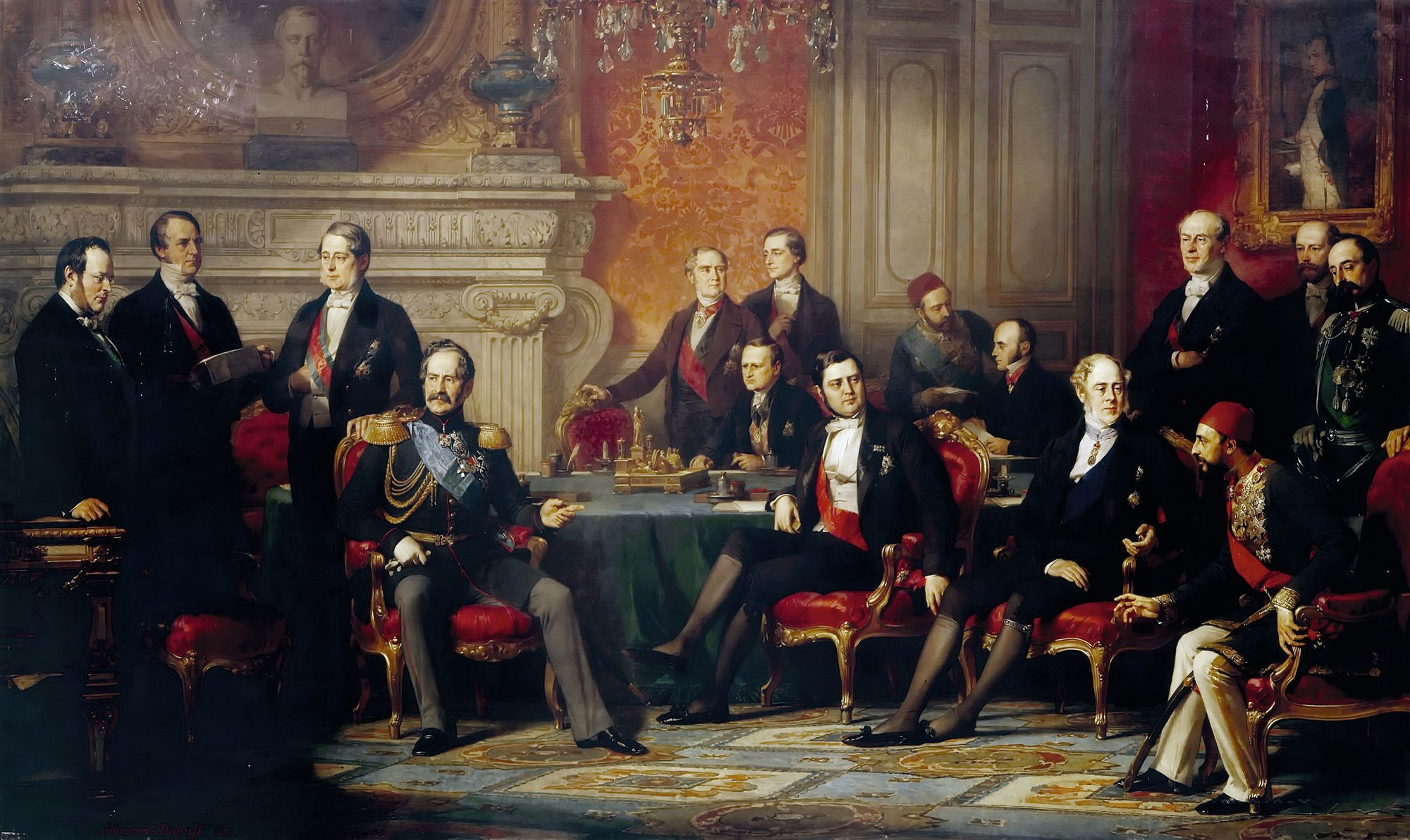
Diplomats at the Congress of Paris, 1856, settled the Crimean War. The Congress of Paris by Edouard Louis Dubufe

Russia was defeated and was forced to accept the Treaty of Paris, signed on 30 March 1856, ending the war. The Powers promised to respect Ottoman independence and territorial integrity. Russia gave up a little land and relinquished its claim to a protectorate over the Christians in the Ottoman domains. In a major blow to Russian power and prestige, the Black Sea was demilitarized, and an international commission was set up to guarantee freedom of commerce and navigation on the Danube river. Moldavia and Wallachia remained under nominal Ottoman rule, but would be granted independent constitutions and national assemblies.

New rules of wartime commerce were set out: (1) privateering was illegal; (2) a neutral flag covered enemy goods except contraband; (3) neutral goods, except contraband, were not liable to capture under an enemy flag; (4) a blockade, to be legal, had to be effective.

The war helped modernize warfare by introducing major new technologies such as railways, the telegraph, and modern nursing methods. In the long run the war marked a turning point in Russian domestic and foreign policy. The Imperial Russian Army demonstrated its weakness, its poor leadership, and its lack of modern weapons and technology. Russia's weak economy was unable to fully support its military adventures, so in the future it redirected its attention to much weaker Muslim areas in Central Asia, and left Europe alone. Russian intellectuals used the humiliating defeat to demand fundamental reform of the government and social system. The war weakened both Russia and Austria, so they could no longer promote stability. This opened the way for Napoleon III, Camillo Benso, Count of Cavour (in Italy) and Otto von Bismarck (in Germany) to launch a series of wars in the 1860s that reshaped Europe.

==== Moldavia and Wallachia ====
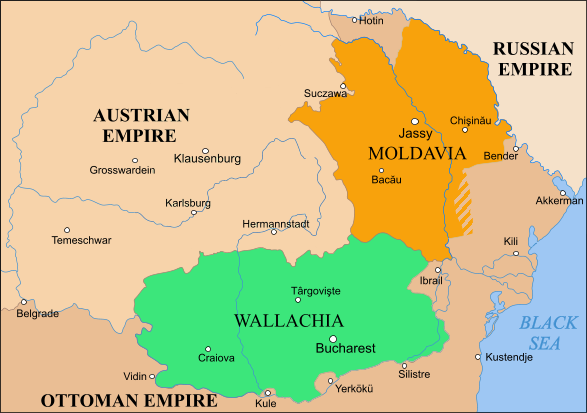
Moldavia, Transylvania (then under Austrian rule) and Wallachia in 1812. In 1859, Moldavia and Wallachia united into the first modern Romanian state, which united with Transylvania in 1918.

In a largely peaceful transition, the Ottoman vassal states of Moldavia and Wallachia broke away slowly from the Ottoman Empire, uniting into what would become modern Romania in 1859, and finally achieving independence in 1878. The two principalities had long been under Ottoman control, but both Russia and Austria also wanted them, making the region a site of conflict in the 19th century. The population was largely Orthodox in religion and spoke Romanian, although there were certain ethnic minorities, such as Jews and Greeks. The principalities were occupied by Russia after the Treaty of Adrianople in 1829. Russian and Turkish troops combined to suppress the Moldavian and Wallachian revolutions of 1848. During the Crimean War, Austria took control of the principalities. The population decided on unification on the basis of historical, cultural and ethnic connections. It took effect in 1859 after the double election of Alexandru Ioan Cuza as Prince of the United Principalities of Moldavia and Wallachia (renamed the United Principalities of Romania in 1862).

With Russian intervention, the Principality of Romania officially became independent in 1878. It then focused its attention on Transylvania, a region historically part of Hungary but with about two million ethnic Romanians. Finally, when the Austro-Hungarian Empire collapsed at the end of the World War I, Romania united with Transylvania.

=== United States defeats Mexico, 1846–1848 ===
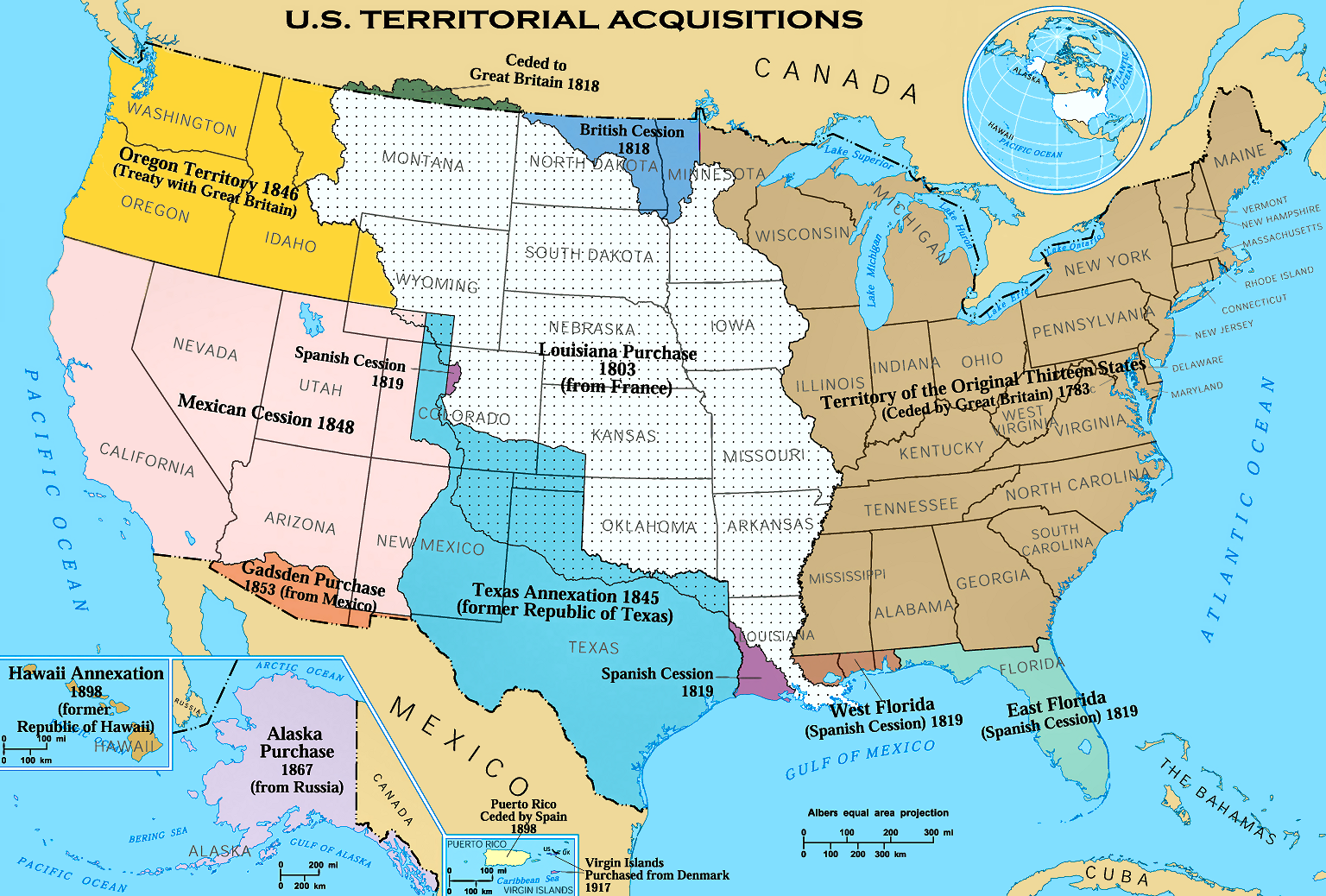
Historical territorial expansion of the United States

Mexico refused to recognize the 1845 U.S. annexation of Texas. It considered the Republic of Texas to be Mexican territory—it did not recognize the 1836 Velasco treaty signed by then Mexican President and Commander-in-Chief Antonio López de Santa Anna under duress while he was a prisoner of the Texian Army, after being defeated in the final battle of the Texas Revolution. Of particular issue for Mexico was Texas' claim of sovereignty stretching down to the Rio Grande. While this was the border stipulated to at Velasco, the Texian government never managed to cement its authority south of the Neuces. Regardless Texas operated as a de facto independent republic during the interim between the revolution and being annexed into the U.S. Following the admission of Texas as an American state-based on the border delineated in the treaty of Velasco, Mexico severed diplomatic ties with U.S., and both countries moved to occupy the disputed territory. The situation quickly escalated; after the Mexican Army ambushed U.S. forces patrolling the area, the United States declared war in May 1846. The United States Army quickly took the initiative, capturing Santa Fe de Nuevo México and Alta California, and invading northern Mexico. In March 1847, the U.S. Navy and Marines commenced the siege of Veracruz, Mexico's largest port. After securing the harbor, the U.S. invasion army proceeded on to capture Mexico City in September, by which time virtually all of Mexico had been overrun by U.S. forces. The Treaty of Guadalupe Hidalgo was signed in February 1848, ending the war, the terms included Mexican recognition of Texas as an American state according to the borders agreed to at Velasco, in addition, Mexico ceded their northern frontier territories to the U.S. in exchange for $15 million (US dollars), America further agreed to forgive $3.25 million in Mexican debt. In total, Mexico relinquished about 55% of its pre-war territorial claims to the United States.

=== Brazil and Argentina ===
Brazil in 1822 became independent of Lisbon. Externally, it faced pressure from Great Britain to end its participation in the Atlantic slave trade. Brazil fought wars in the La Plata river region: the Cisplatine War against Argentina (in 1825); the Platine War with Argentina (in the 1850s); the Uruguayan War and the Paraguayan War (in the 1860s). This last war saw Argentina and Brazil as allies against Paraguay; in what was the bloodiest war in South American history. The conflict ended in victory for the alliance and the near destruction of Paraguay as a nation-state. After which, Brazil and Argentina entered into a quiet period, averse to external political and military interventions.

== 1860–1871: Nationalism and unification ==
The force of nationalism grew dramatically in the early and middle 19th century, involving a realization of cultural identity among the people sharing the same language and religious heritage. It was strong in the established countries, and was a powerful force for demanding more unity with or independence from Germans, Irish, Italians, Greeks, and the Slavic peoples of Southeast Europe. The strong sense of nationalism also grew in established independent nations, such as Britain and France. English historian J. B. Bury argues:

Between 1830 and 1870 nationalism had thus made great strides. It had inspired great literature, quickened scholarship and nurtured heroes. It had shown its power both to unify and to divide. It had led to great achievements of political construction and consolidation in Germany and Italy; but it was more clearly than ever a threat to the Ottoman and Habsburg empires, which were essentially multi-national. European culture had been enriched by the new vernacular contributions of little-known or forgotten peoples, but at the same time such unity as it had was imperilled by fragmentation. Moreover, the antagonisms fostered by nationalism had made not only for wars, insurrections, and local hatreds — they had accentuated or created new spiritual divisions in a nominally Christian Europe.

=== Great Britain ===
In 1859, following another short-lived Conservative government, Prime Minister Lord Palmerston and Earl Russell made up their differences, and Russell consented to serve as Foreign Secretary in a new Palmerston cabinet. It was the first true Liberal Cabinet. This period was a particularly eventful one in the world, seeing the Unification of Italy, the American Civil War, and the 1864 war over Schleswig-Holstein between Denmark and the German states. Russell and Palmerston were tempted to intervene on the side of the Confederacy in the American Civil War, but they kept Britain neutral in every case.

=== France ===
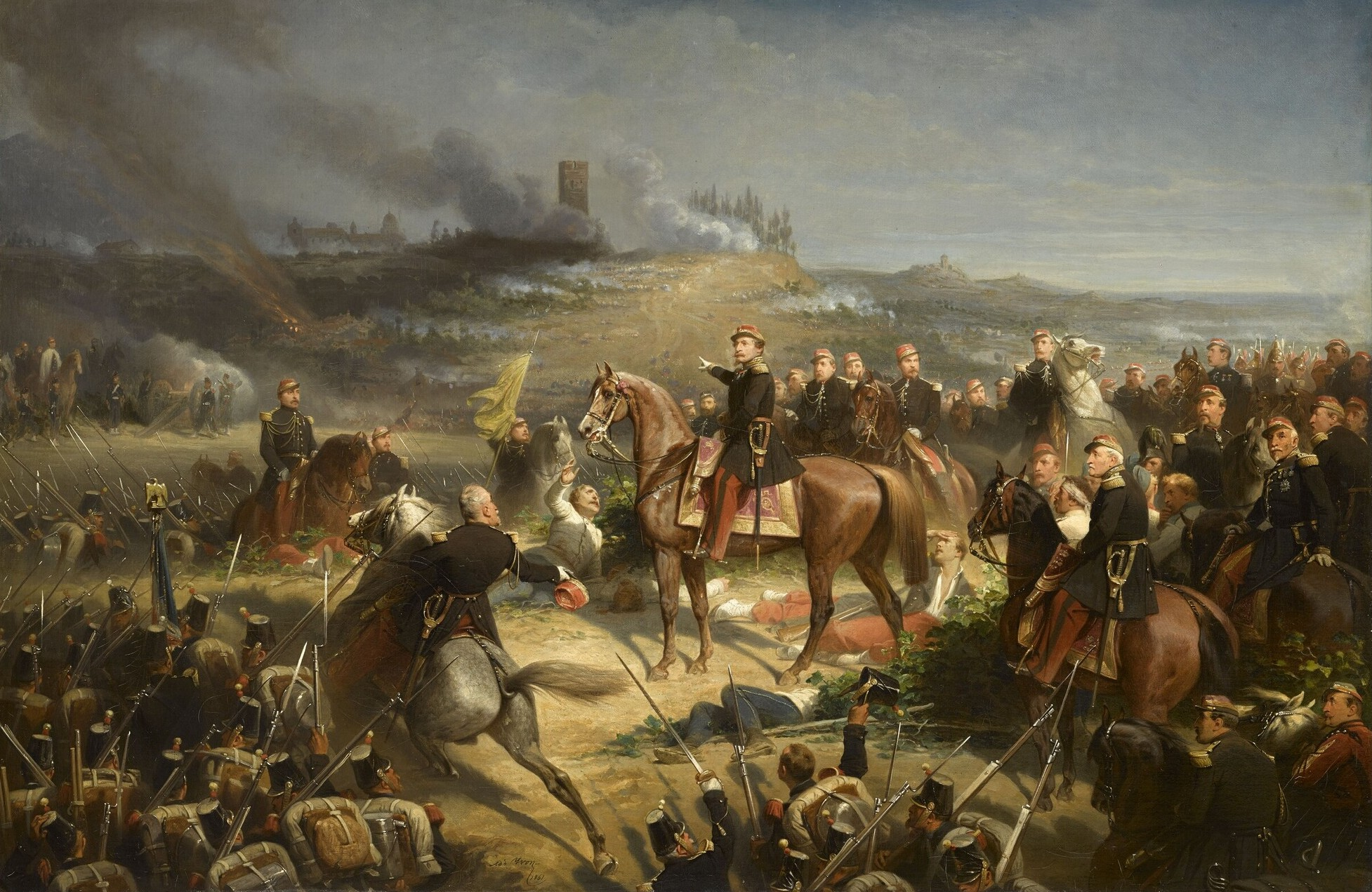
The Battle of Solferino by Adolphe Yvon. Napoleon III with the French forces at the Battle of Solferino, which secured the Austrian withdrawal from Italy

In 1763 and again in 1815 France lost much of its global empire. After 1830 it again became a major global political, economic, military and colonial power. It regained influence in nearby areas in western Europe and Italy. Its new holdings in the Mediterranean, the Middle East and Africa rivaled those of Britain. Direct French rule in North Africa began in 1830 with the conquest of Algeria, where it encouraged French and Italian immigrants to settle. In the rest of Africa it created trade stations, and military posts. It gained full control of Indochina and was threatening southern China. It tried and failed to take control of Mexico.

Despite his 1851 promises of a peaceful reign, Napoleon III could not resist the temptations of glory in foreign affairs. He was visionary, mysterious and secretive; he had a poor staff, and kept running afoul of his domestic supporters. In the end he was incompetent as a diplomat. After a brief threat of an invasion of Britain in 1851, France and Britain cooperated in the 1850s, with an alliance in the Crimean War, and a major trade treaty in 1860. However, Britain viewed the Second French Empire with increasing distrust, especially as the emperor built up his navy, expanded his empire and took up a more active foreign policy.

Napoleon III did score some successes: he strengthened French control over Algeria, established bases in Africa, began the takeover of Indochina, and opened trade with China. He facilitated a French company building the Suez Canal, which Britain could not stop. In Europe, however, Napoleon failed again and again. The Crimean war of 1854–1856 produced no gains. War with Austria in 1859 facilitated the unification of Italy, and Napoleon was rewarded with the annexation of Savoy and Nice. The British grew annoyed at his intervention in Syria in 1860–1861. He angered Catholics alarmed at his poor treatment of the Pope, then reversed himself and angered the anticlerical liberals at home and his erstwhile Italian allies. He lowered tariffs, which helped in the long run but in the short run angered owners of large estates and the textile and iron industrialists, while leading worried workers to organize. Matters grew worse in the 1860s as Napoleon nearly blundered into war with the United States in 1862, while his Mexican intervention in 1861–1867 was a total disaster. Finally in the end he went to war with Prussia in 1870 when it was too late to stop the unification of all Germans, aside from Austria, under the leadership of Prussia. Napoleon had alienated everyone; after failing to obtain an alliance with Austria and Italy, France had no allies and was bitterly divided at home. It was disastrously defeated on the battlefield in the Franco-Prussian War, losing Alsace–Lorraine. A. J. P. Taylor is blunt: "he ruined France as a great power".

=== Italian unification ===
The stages of Italian unification between 1829 and 1871

The Risorgimento was the era from 1848 to 1871 that saw the achievement of independence of the Italians from Austrian Habsburgs in the north and the Bourbons in the south, securing national unification. Piedmont (known as the Kingdom of Sardinia) took the lead and imposed its constitutional system on the new nation of Italy.

The papacy secured French backing to resist unification, fearing that giving up control of the Papal States would weaken the Catholic Church and allow the liberals to dominate conservative Catholics. The Kingdom of Italy finally took over the Papal States in 1870, when the French Army was withdrawn. The angry Pope Pius IX declared himself a prisoner; his successor Pope Pius XI finally made peace with Italy in 1929. After 1870 Italy was recognized as the sixth great power, albeit much weaker than the others.

=== United States ===
During the American Civil War (1861–1865), the Southern slave states attempted to secede from the Union and set up an independent country, the Confederate States of America. The North would not accept the breakup of the Union, and fought to restore it. British and French aristocratic leaders personally disliked American republicanism and favored the more aristocratic Confederacy. The South was also by far the chief source of cotton for European textile mills. The goal of the Confederacy was to obtain British and French intervention, that is, war against the Union. Confederates believed that "cotton is king" – that is, cotton was so essential to British and French industry that they would fight to get it. The Confederates did raise money in Europe, which they used to buy warships and munitions. However Britain had a large surplus of cotton in 1861; stringency did not come until 1862. Most important was the dependence on grain from the U.S. North for a large portion of the British food supply, France would not intervene alone, and in any case was less interested in cotton than in securing its control of Mexico. The Confederacy would allow that if it secured its independence, but the Union would never approve. Washington made it clear that any official recognition of the Confederacy meant war with the U.S.

Queen Victoria's husband Prince Albert helped defuse a war scare in late 1861. The British people generally favored the United States. What little cotton was available came from New York City, as the blockade by the Union Navy shut down 95% of Southern exports to Britain. In September 1862, during the Confederate invasion of Maryland, Britain (along with France) contemplated stepping in and negotiating a peace settlement, which could only mean war with the United States. But in the same month, President Abraham Lincoln announced the Emancipation Proclamation. Since support of the Confederacy now meant support for slavery, there was no longer any possibility of European intervention.

However, several British firms built small fast blockade runners to smuggle hundreds of thousands of weapons to Confederate ports and surreptitiously allowed warships to be built for the Confederacy. Both blockade runners and warships caused a major diplomatic row and in the Alabama Claims in 1872, the international arbitration in Geneva ruled in the Americans' favor, with $15.5 million paid by Britain to the U.S. only for damages caused by British-built Confederate warships.

=== Germany ===
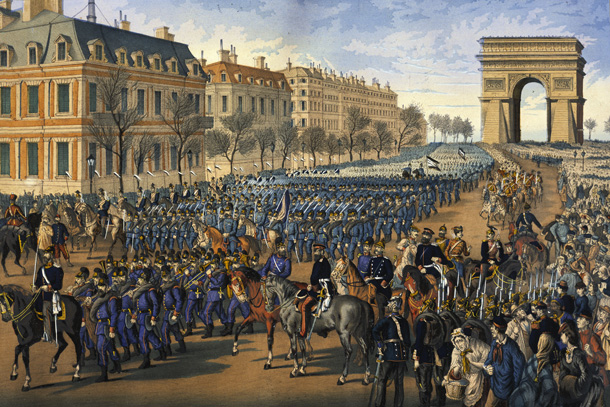
German troops parade down the Champs-Élysées in Paris after their victory in the Franco-Prussian War.

The Kingdom of Prussia, under the leadership of Otto von Bismarck, took the lead in uniting all of Germany (except for Austria), and created a new German Empire, headed by the king of Prussia. To do it, he engaged in a series of short, decisive wars with Denmark, Austria and France. The many smaller German states followed the lead of Prussia, until finally they united together after defeating France in 1871. Bismarck's Germany then became the most powerful and dynamic state in Europe, and Bismarck himself promoted decades of peace in Europe.

==== Schleswig and Holstein ====
A major diplomatic row, and several wars, emerged from the very complex situation in Schleswig and Holstein, where Danish and German claims collided, and Austria and France became entangled. The Danish and German duchies of Schleswig-Holstein were, by international agreement, ruled by the king of Denmark but were not legally part of Denmark. An international treaty provided that the two territories were not to be separated from each other, though Holstein was part of the German Confederation. In the late 1840s, with both German and Danish nationalism on the rise, Denmark attempted to incorporate Schleswig into its kingdom. The first war was a Danish victory. The Second Schleswig War of 1864 was a Danish defeat at the hands of Prussia and Austria.

==== Unification ====
Berlin and Vienna split control of the two territories. That led to conflict between them, resolved by the Austro-Prussian War of 1866, which Prussia quickly won, thus becoming the leader of the German-speaking peoples. Austria now dropped to the second rank among the Great Powers. Emperor Napoleon III of France could not tolerate the rapid rise of Prussia, and started the Franco-Prussian War of 1870–71 over perceived insults and other trivialities. The spirit of German nationalism caused the smaller German states (such as Bavaria and Saxony) to join the war alongside Prussia. The German coalition won an easy victory, dropping France to second class status among the Great Powers. Prussia, under Otto von Bismarck, then brought together almost all the German states (excluding Austria, Luxembourg and Liechtenstein) into a new German Empire. Bismarck's new empire became the most powerful state in continental Europe until 1914. Napoleon III was overconfident in his military strength and failed to stop the rush to war when he was unable to find allies who would support a war to stop German unification.

== 1871: The year of transition ==
=== Maintaining the peace ===
Bismarck's alliances

1 / Dual Alliance (1879); 2 / League of the Three Emperors (1881)	3 / Triple Alliance (1882); 4 / Reinsurance Treaty (1887)

After fifteen years of warfare in the Crimea, Germany and France, Europe began a period of peace in 1871. With the founding of the German Empire and the signing of the Treaty of Frankfurt (10 May 1871), Otto von Bismarck emerged as a decisive figure in European history from 1871 to 1890. He retained control over Prussia and as well as the foreign and domestic policies of the new German Empire. Bismarck had built his reputation as a war-maker but changed overnight into a peacemaker. He skillfully used balance of power diplomacy to maintain Germany's position in a Europe which, despite many disputes and war scares, remained at peace. For historian Eric Hobsbawm, it was Bismarck who "remained undisputed world champion at the game of multilateral diplomatic chess for almost twenty years after 1871, [and] devoted himself exclusively, and successfully, to maintaining peace between the powers". Historian Paul Knaplund concludes:

A net result of the strength and military prestige of Germany combined with situations created or manipulated by her chancellor was that in the eighties Bismarck became the umpire in all serious diplomatic disputes, whether they concerned Europe, Africa, or Asia. Questions such as the boundaries of Balkan states, the treatment of Armenians in the Turkish empire and of Jews in Romania, the financial affairs of Egypt, Russian expansion in the Middle East, the war between France and China, and the partition of Africa had to be referred to Berlin; Bismarck held the key to all these problems.

Bismarck's main mistake was giving in to the Army and to intense public demand in Germany for acquisition of the border provinces of Alsace-Lorraine, thereby turning France into a permanent, deeply-committed enemy (see French–German enmity). Theodore Zeldin says, "Revenge and the recovery of Alsace-Lorraine became a principal object of French policy for the next forty years. That Germany was France's enemy became the basic fact of international relations." Bismarck's solution was to make France a pariah nation, encouraging royalty to ridicule its new republican status, and building complex alliances with the other major powers – Austria, Russia, and Britain – to keep France isolated diplomatically. A key element was the League of the Three Emperors, in which Bismarck brought together rulers in Berlin, Vienna and St. Petersburg to guarantee each other's security, while blocking out France; it lasted from 1881 to 1887.

=== Major powers ===
Britain had entered an era of "splendid isolation", avoiding entanglements that had led it into the unhappy Crimean War in 1854–1856. It concentrated on internal industrial development and political reform, and building up its great international holdings, the British Empire, while maintaining by far the world's strongest Navy to protect its island home and its many overseas possessions. It had come dangerously close to intervening in the American Civil War in 1861–1862, and in May 1871 it signed the Treaty of Washington with the United States that put into arbitration the American claims that the lack of British neutrality had prolonged the war; arbitrators eventually awarded the United States $15 million. Russia took advantage of the Franco-Prussian war to renounce the 1856 treaty in which it had been forced to demilitarize the Black Sea. Repudiation of treaties was unacceptable to the powers, so the solution was a conference in January 1871 at London that formally abrogated key elements of the 1856 treaty and endorsed the new Russian action. Russia had always wanted control of Constantinople and the Turkish Straits that connected the Black Sea to the Mediterranean and would nearly achieve that in the First World War. France had long stationed an army in Rome to protect the pope; it recalled the soldiers in 1870, and the Kingdom of Italy moved in, seized the remaining papal territories, and made Rome its capital city in 1871 ending the risorgimento. Italy was finally unified, but at the cost of alienating the pope and the Catholic community for a half century; the unstable situation was resolved in 1929 with the Lateran Treaties.

=== Conscription ===
A major trend was the move away from a professional army to a Prussian system that combined a core of professional careerists, a rotating base of conscripts, who after a year or two of active duty moved into a decade or more of reserve duty with a required summer training program every year. Training took place in peacetime, and in wartime a much larger, well-trained, fully staffed army could be mobilized very quickly. Prussia had started in 1814, and the Prussian triumphs of the 1860s made its model irresistible. The key element was universal conscription, with relatively few exemptions. The upper strata was drafted into the officer corps for one year's training, but was nevertheless required to do its full reserve duty along with everyone else. Austria adopted the system in 1868 (shortly after its defeat by Prussia) and France in 1872 (shortly after its defeat by Prussia and other German states). Japan followed in 1873, Russia in 1874, and Italy in 1875. All major countries adopted conscription by 1900, except for Great Britain and the United States. By then peacetime Germany had an army of 545,000, which could be expanded in a matter of days to 3.4 million by calling up the reserves. The comparable numbers in France were 1.8 million and 3.5 million; Austria, 1.1 million and 2.6 million; Russia, 1.7 million to 4 million. The new system was expensive, with a per capita cost of the forces doubling or even tripling between 1870 and 1914. By then total defense spending averaged about 5% of the national income. Nevertheless, taxpayers seemed satisfied; parents were especially impressed with the dramatic improvements shown in the immature boys they sent away at age 18, compared to the worldly-wise men who returned two years later.

== Imperialism ==
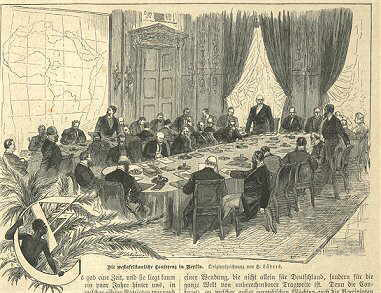
The Berlin Conference chaired by German Chancellor Otto von Bismarck regulated European imperialism in Africa.

Most of the major powers (and some minor ones such as Belgium, the Netherlands and Denmark) engaged in imperialism, building up their overseas empires especially in Africa and Asia. Although there were numerous insurrections, historians count only a few wars, and they were small-scale: the First and Second Boer Wars (1880–1881 and 1899–1902), First Sino-Japanese War (1894–1895), First Italo-Ethiopian War (1895–1896), Spanish–American War (1898), Philippine–American War (1899-1902), and Italo-Ottoman war (1911). The largest was the Russo-Japanese War of 1905, the only in which two major powers fought each other.

Among the main empires from 1875 to 1914, historians assess a mixed record in terms of profitability. The assumption was that colonies would provide an excellent captive market for manufactured items. Apart from India, this was seldom true. By the 1890s, imperialists gained economic benefit primarily in the production of inexpensive raw materials to feed the domestic manufacturing sector. Overall, Great Britain profited well from India, but not from most of the rest of its empire. The Netherlands did very well in the East Indies. Germany and Italy got very little trade or raw materials from their empires. France did slightly better. The Congo Free State was notoriously profitable when it was a capitalistic rubber plantation owned and operated by King Leopold II of Belgium as a private enterprise. However, scandal after scandal regarding badly mistreated labour led the international community to force the government of Belgium to take it over in 1908, and the Belgian Congo became much less profitable. The Philippines cost the United States much more than expected.

The world's colonial population at the time of the First World War totaled about 560 million people, of whom 70.0% were in British domains, 10.0% in French, 8.6% in Dutch, 3.9% in Japanese, 2.2% in German, 2.1% in American, 1.6% in Portuguese, 1.2% in Belgian, and 0.5% in Italian possessions. The home domains of the colonial powers had a total population of about 370 million people.

=== French Empire in Asia and Africa ===
==== France seizes, then loses Mexico ====
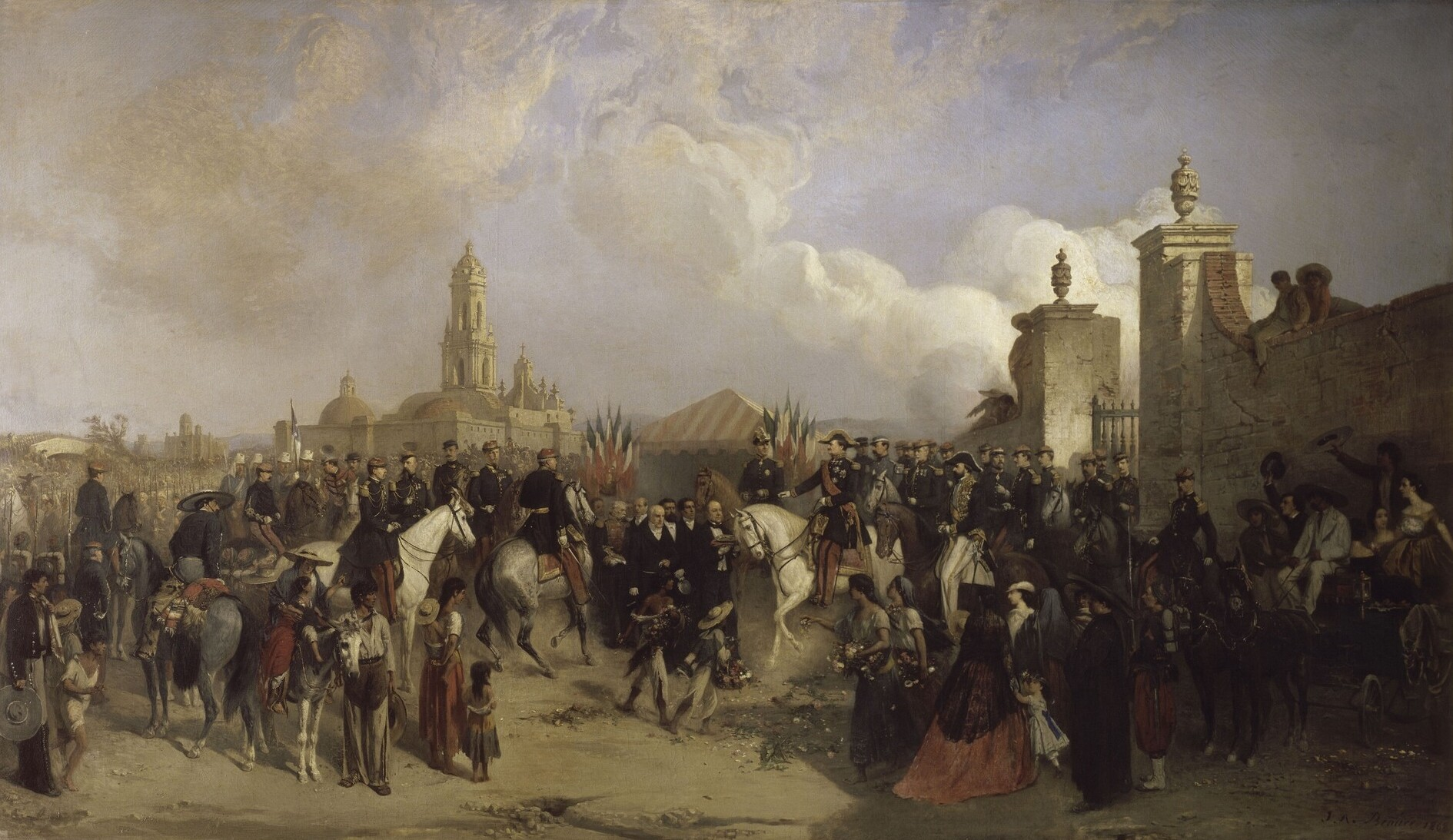
Entry of the French Expeditionary Force into Mexico City by Jean-Adolphe Beaucé. Entrance of the French Expeditionary Corps into Mexico City, 10 June 1863

Napoleon III took advantage of the American Civil War to attempt to take control of Mexico and impose its own puppet Emperor Maximilian I of Mexico. France, Spain, and Britain, angry over unpaid Mexican debts, sent a joint expeditionary force that seized the Veracruz customs house in Mexico in December 1861. Spain and Britain soon withdrew after realizing that Napoleon III intended to overthrow the Second Federal Republic of Mexico under elected president Benito Juárez and establish a Second Mexican Empire. Napoleon had the support of the remnants of the Conservative elements that Juarez and his Liberals had defeated in the Reform War, a civil war from 1857 to 1861. In the French intervention in Mexico in 1862 Napoleon installed Austrian archduke Maximilian of Habsburg as Emperor of Mexico. Juárez rallied opposition to the French; Washington supported Juárez and refused to recognize the new government because it violated the Monroe Doctrine. After its victory over the Confederacy in 1865, the U.S. sent 50,000 experienced combat troops to the Mexican border to make clear its position. Napoleon was stretched very thin; he had committed 40,000 troops to Mexico, 20,000 to Rome to guard the Pope against the Italians, and another 80,000 in restive French Algeria. Furthermore, Prussia, having just defeated Austria, was an imminent threat. Napoleon realized his predicament and withdrew all his forces from Mexico in 1866. Juarez regained control and executed the hapless emperor.

The Suez Canal, initially built by the French, became a joint British-French project in 1875, as both considered it vital to maintaining their influence and empires in Asia. In 1882, ongoing civil disturbances in Egypt prompted Britain to intervene, extending a hand to France. France's leading expansionist Jules Ferry was out of office, and the government allowed Britain to take effective control of Egypt.

=== British takeover of Egypt, 1882 ===
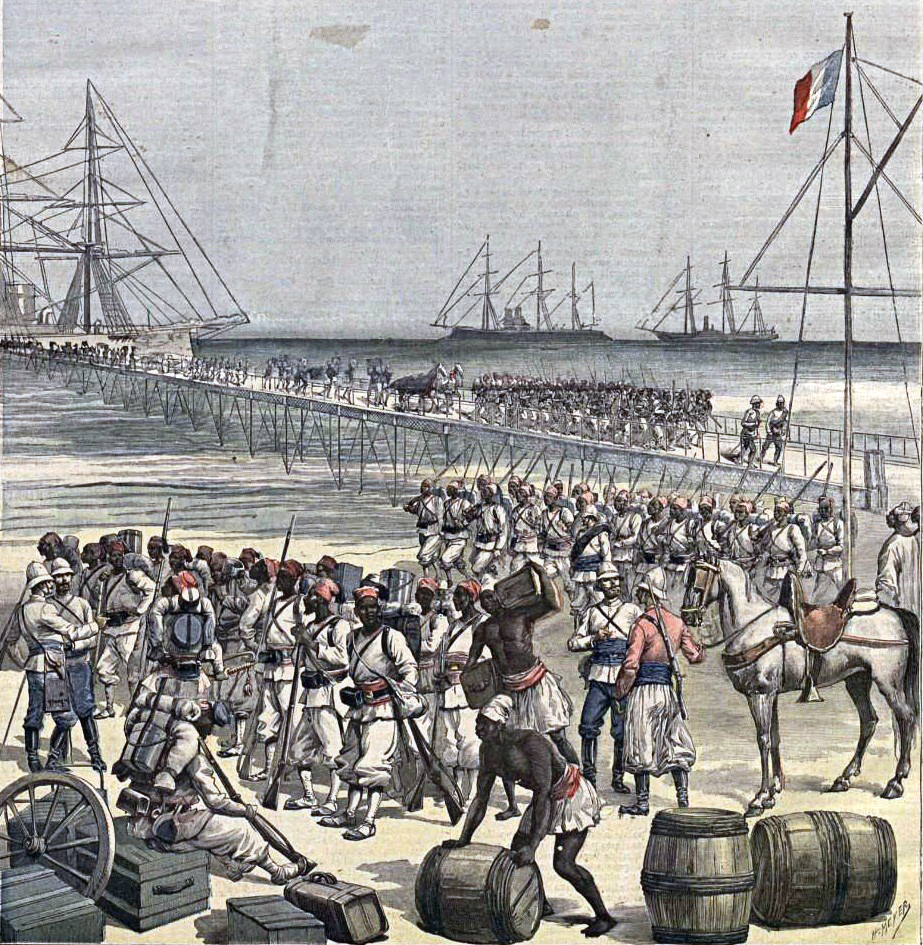
In 1892, the Senegalese Tirailleurs, led by Colonel Alfred-Amédée Dodds, invaded Dahomey (present-day Benin).

The most decisive event emerged from the Anglo-Egyptian War, which resulted in the British occupation of Egypt for seven decades, even though the Ottoman Empire retained nominal ownership until 1914. France was seriously unhappy, having lost control of the canal that it built and financed and had dreamed of for decades. Germany, Austria, Russia, and Italy – and of course the Ottoman Empire itself—were all angered by London's unilateral intervention. Historian A.J.P. Taylor says that this "was a great event; indeed, the only real event in international relations between the Battle of Sedan and the defeat of Russia in the Russo-Japanese war." Taylor emphasizes the long-term impact:

The British occupation of Egypt altered the balance of power. It not only gave the British security for their route to India; it made them masters of the Eastern Mediterranean and the Middle East; it made it unnecessary for them to stand in the front line against Russia at the Straits....And thus prepared the way for the Franco-Russian Alliance ten years later.

Prime Minister William Ewart Gladstone and his Liberal Party had a reputation for strong opposition to imperialism, so historians have long debated the explanation for this sudden reversal of policy. The most influential was study by John Robinson and Ronald Gallagher, Africa and the Victorians (1961), which focused on The Imperialism of Free Trade and was promoted by the Cambridge School of historiography. They argue there was no long-term Liberal plan in support of imperialism, but the urgent necessity to act to protect the Suez Canal was decisive in the face of what appeared to be a radical collapse of law and order, and a nationalist revolt focused on expelling the Europeans, regardless of the damage it would do to international trade and the British Empire. A complete takeover of Egypt, turning it into a British colony like India was much too dangerous for it would be the signal for the powers to rush in for the spoils of the tottering Ottoman Empire, with a major war a likely result.

Gladstone's decision came against strained relations with France, and maneuvering by "men on the spot" in Egypt. Critics such as Cain and Hopkins have stressed the need to protect large sums invested by British financiers and Egyptian bonds, while downplaying the risk to the viability of the Suez Canal. Unlike the Marxists, they stress "gentlemanly" financial and commercial interests, not the industrial, capitalism that Marxists believe was always central. More recently, specialists on Egypt have been interested primarily in the internal dynamics among Egyptians that produce the failed Urabi revolt.

=== Great Game in Central Asia: Britain vs Russia ===
Russian Turkestan at the beginning of 20th century

The "Great Game" was a political and diplomatic confrontation that existed for most of the nineteenth century between Britain and Russia over Afghanistan and neighbouring territories in Central and Southern Asia, especially Persia (Iran) and Turkestan. Britain made it a high priority to protect all the approaches to India. Russia had no logistical ability to invade India directly, but made invasion plans considered credible by Britain because of the Russian conquest of Central Asia. Meanwhile, both powers attempted colonial frontier expansion in Inner Asia. As Robert Irwin puts it, "Anglo-Russian rivalry took the form of missions of exploration and espionage. Though Englishmen and Russians in unconvincing native disguises sometimes ventured into the contentious territories, more usually both sides made use of proxies." This resulted in an atmosphere of distrust and a semi-constant threat of war between the two empires. There were numerous local conflicts, but a war in Central Asia between the two powers never happened.

Bismarck realized that both Russia and Britain considered control of Central Asia a high priority, dubbed the "Great Game". Germany had no direct stakes, however its dominance of Europe was enhanced when Russian troops were based as far away from Germany as possible. Over two decades, 1871–1890, he maneuvered to help the British, hoping to force the Russians to commit more soldiers to Asia. However, Bismarck through the Three Emperors' League also aided Russia, by pressuring the Ottoman Empire to block the Bosporus from British naval access, compelling an Anglo-Russian negotiation regarding Afghanistan.

=== Scramble for Africa ===
Central and East Africa, 1898, during the Fashoda Incident

The "Scramble for Africa" was launched by Britain's unexpected takeover of Egypt in 1882. In response, it became a free-for-all for the control of the rest of Africa, as Britain, France, Germany, Italy and Portugal all greatly expanded their colonial empires in Africa. The King of Belgium personally controlled the Congo. Bases along the coast become the nucleus of colonies that stretched inland. In the 20th century, the Scramble for Africa was widely denounced by anti-imperialist spokesmen. At the time, however, it was praised as a solution to the terrible violence and exploitation caused by unrestrained adventurers, slave traders, and exploiters. Bismarck took the lead in trying to stabilize the situation by the Berlin Conference of 1884–1885. All the European powers agreed on ground rules to avoid conflicts in Africa.

In British colonies, workers and businessmen from India were brought in to build railways, plantations and other enterprises. Britain immediately applied the administrative lessons that had been learned in India, to Egypt and other new African colonies.

Tensions between Britain and France reached a tinder stage in Africa. At several points, war was possible, but never happened. The most serious episode was the Fashoda Incident of 1898. French troops tried to claim an area in Southern Sudan, and a British force purporting to be acting in the interest of the Khedive of Egypt arrived to confront them. Under heavy pressure, the French withdrew securing Anglo-Egyptian control over the area. The status quo was recognised by an agreement between the two states acknowledging British control over Egypt, while France became the dominant power in Morocco, but France experienced a serious disappointment.

The Ottoman Empire lost its nominal control over Algeria, Tunisia and Libya. It retained only nominal control of Egypt. In 1875, Britain purchased the Suez Canal shares from the almost bankrupt khedive of Egypt, Isma'il Pasha.

==== Kenya ====
Areas of Africa controlled by colonial powers in 1913, shown along with current national boundaries: Belgian British French German Italian Portuguese Spanish Independent (Ethiopia and Liberia)

The experience of Kenya is representative of the colonization process in East Africa. By 1850 European explorers had begun mapping the interior. Three developments encouraged European interest in East Africa. First was the emergence of the island Sultanate of Zanzibar, located off the east coast. It became a base from which trade and exploration of the African mainland could be mounted.

By 1840, to protect the interests of the various nationals doing business in Zanzibar, consul offices had been opened by the British, French, Germans and Americans. In 1859, the tonnage of foreign shipping calling at Zanzibar had reached 19,000 tons. By 1879, the tonnage of this shipping had reached 89,000 tons. The second development spurring European interest in Africa was the growing European demand for products of Africa including ivory and cloves. Thirdly, British interest in East Africa was first stimulated by their desire to abolish the slave trade. Later in the century, British interest in East Africa was stimulated by German competition, and in 1887 the Imperial British East Africa Company, a private concern, leased from Barghash bin Said of Zanzibar his mainland holdings, a 10-mile (16-km)-wide strip of land along the coast.

Germany set up a protectorate over the Sultan of Zanzibar's coastal possessions in 1885. It traded its coastal holdings to Britain in 1890, in exchange for German control over the coast of Tanganyika and Heligoland.

In 1895 the British government claimed the interior as far west as Lake Naivasha; it set up the East Africa Protectorate. The border was extended to Uganda in 1902, and in 1920 most of the enlarged protectorate became a crown colony. With the beginning of colonial rule in 1895, the Rift Valley and the surrounding Highlands became the enclave of white immigrants engaged in large-scale coffee farming dependent on mostly Kikuyu labour. There were no significant mineral resources—none of the gold or diamonds that attracted so many to South Africa. In the initial stage of colonial rule, the administration relied on traditional communicators, usually chiefs. When colonial rule was established and efficiency was sought, partly because of settler pressure, newly educated younger men were associated with old chiefs in local Native Councils.

Following severe financial difficulties of the British East Africa Company, the British government on 1 July 1895 established direct rule through the East African Protectorate, subsequently opening (1902) the fertile highlands to white settlers. A key to the development of Kenya's interior was the construction, started in 1895, of a railway from Mombasa to Kisumu, on Lake Victoria, completed in 1901. Some 32,000 workers were imported from British India to do the manual labour. Many stayed, as did most of the Indian traders and small businessmen who saw opportunity in the opening up of the interior of Kenya.

=== Portugal ===
The Kingdom of Portugal, a small poor agrarian nation with a strong seafaring tradition, built up a large empire, and kept it longer than anyone else by avoiding wars and remaining largely under the protection of Britain. In 1899 it renewed its Treaty of Windsor with Britain originally written in 1386. Energetic explorations in the sixteenth century led to a settler colony in Brazil. Portugal also established trading stations open to all nations off the coasts of Africa, South Asia, and East Asia. Portugal had imported slaves as domestic servants and farm workers in Portugal itself, and used its experience to make slave trading a major economic activity. Portuguese businessmen set up slave plantations on the nearby islands of Madeira, Cape Verde, and the Azores, focusing on sugar production. In 1770, the enlightened despot Sebastião José de Carvalho e Melo, 1st Marquis of Pombal declared trade to be a noble and necessary profession, allowing businessmen to enter the Portuguese nobility. Many settlers moved to Brazil, which became independent in 1822.

After 1815, Lisbon held the trading ports along the African coast, moving inland to take control of Angola and Portuguese East Africa (Mozambique). The slave trade was abolished in 1836, in part because many foreign slave ships were flying the Portuguese flag. In India, trade flourished in the colony of Goa, with its subsidiary colonies of Macau, near Hong Kong on the China coast, and Timor, north of Australia. The Portuguese successfully introduced Catholicism and the Portuguese language into their colonies, while most settlers continued to head to Brazil.

=== Italy ===
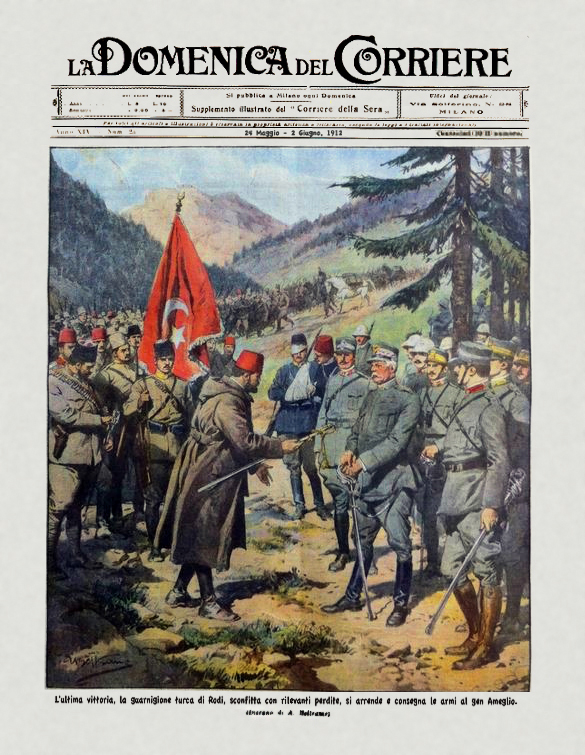
Surrender of the Turkish garrison in Rhodes to the Italian general, 1912

Italy was often called the least of the great powers for its weak industry and weak military. In the Scramble for Africa of the 1880s, leaders of the new nation of Italy were enthusiastic about acquiring colonies in Africa, expecting it would legitimize their status as a power and help unify the people. In North Africa, Italy first turned to Tunis, under nominal Ottoman control, where many Italian farmers had settled. Weak and diplomatically isolated, Italy was helpless and angered when France assumed a protectorate over Tunis in 1881. Turning to East Africa, Italy tried to conquer the independent Ethiopian Empire, but was massively defeated at the Battle of Adwa in 1896. Public opinion was angered at the national humiliation by an inept government. In 1911 the Italian people supported the seizure of what is now Libya.

During the 1880s, the Italian military and government showed interest in acquiring territorial footholds in China similar to other European powers, inspired partly by Germany's success in securing Jiaozhou Bay and Britain-France's own concessions. In this context, Italy explored the idea of leasing Taiwan from the Qing dynasty. The proposal was never realized, and historical records indicate it remained a discussion or consideration rather than an official lease agreement. The Italian curiosity about Taiwan reflected broader European imperial competition in East Asia during the late Qing period, but no formal concession was granted to Italy on the island.

Which occurred Sanmen Bay Affair, China, when the Kingdom of Italy sought to establish a territorial concession in Sanmen Bay (Sānmén Xiàn), Zhejiang Province. Italy dispatched the armored cruiser Marco Polo and cruiser Elba, intending to occupy the bay and compel China to grant a naval and commercial concession. The strategy included an ultimatum to the Qing government, executed through Italian Minister Renato De Martino. Italy's approach was hasty and poorly coordinated, Conflicting telegrams from Italy's Foreign Minister Felice Napoleone Canevaro caused De Martino to present an ultimatum even after initial orders to halt naval action. Italy assumed support from Britain, but the British government explicitly refused to endorse any military enforcement. The Qing response was firm as Chinese's Tsungli Yamen summarily rejected Italy's demands, returning diplomatic notes unopened. Italy struggled diplomatically to salvage the situation, issuing revised and contradictory demands. The successful refusal enhanced China's confidence in resisting foreign powers, at least temporarily. The Sanmen Bay failure remained a symbol of "Italian national humiliation" but also spurred Italy's later cautious approach to Chinese concessions. Historians suggest that this overestimation of Chinese strength influenced the imperial court to later support the Boxer Uprising, a violent anti-foreign movement led eight powers intervention.

Italian diplomacy over a twenty-year period succeeded in getting permission to seize Libya, with approval coming from Germany, France, Austria, Britain, and Russia. A centerpiece of the Italo-Turkish War of 1911–1912 came when the Royal Italian Army took control of a few coastal cities against stiff resistance by the Ottoman Army as well as the local tribesmen. After the peace treaty gave Italy control it sent in Italian settlers, but suffered extensive casualties in its brutal campaign against the tribes.

=== Rise of Japan ===
Starting in the 1860s Japan rapidly modernized along Western lines, adding industry, bureaucracy, institutions and military capabilities that provided the base for imperial expansion into Korea, China, Taiwan and islands to the south. It saw itself vulnerable to aggressive Western imperialism unless it took control of neighboring areas. It took control of Okinawa and Formosa. Japan's desire to control Taiwan, Korea, and Manchuria, led to the first Sino-Japanese War with China in 1894–1895 and the Russo-Japanese War with Russia in 1904–1905. The war with China made Japan the world's first Eastern, modern imperial power, and the war with Russia proved that a Western power could be defeated by an Eastern state. The aftermath of these two wars left Japan the dominant power in the Far East with a sphere of influence extending over southern Manchuria and Korea, which was formally annexed as part of the Japanese Empire in 1910.

==== Okinawa ====
Okinawa island is the largest of the Ryukyu Islands, and paid tribute to China from the late 14th century. Japan assumed suzerainty of the entire Ryukyu island chain in 1609 jointly with China, and formally incorporated the Ryukyu Kingdom into Japan in 1879.

==== War with China ====
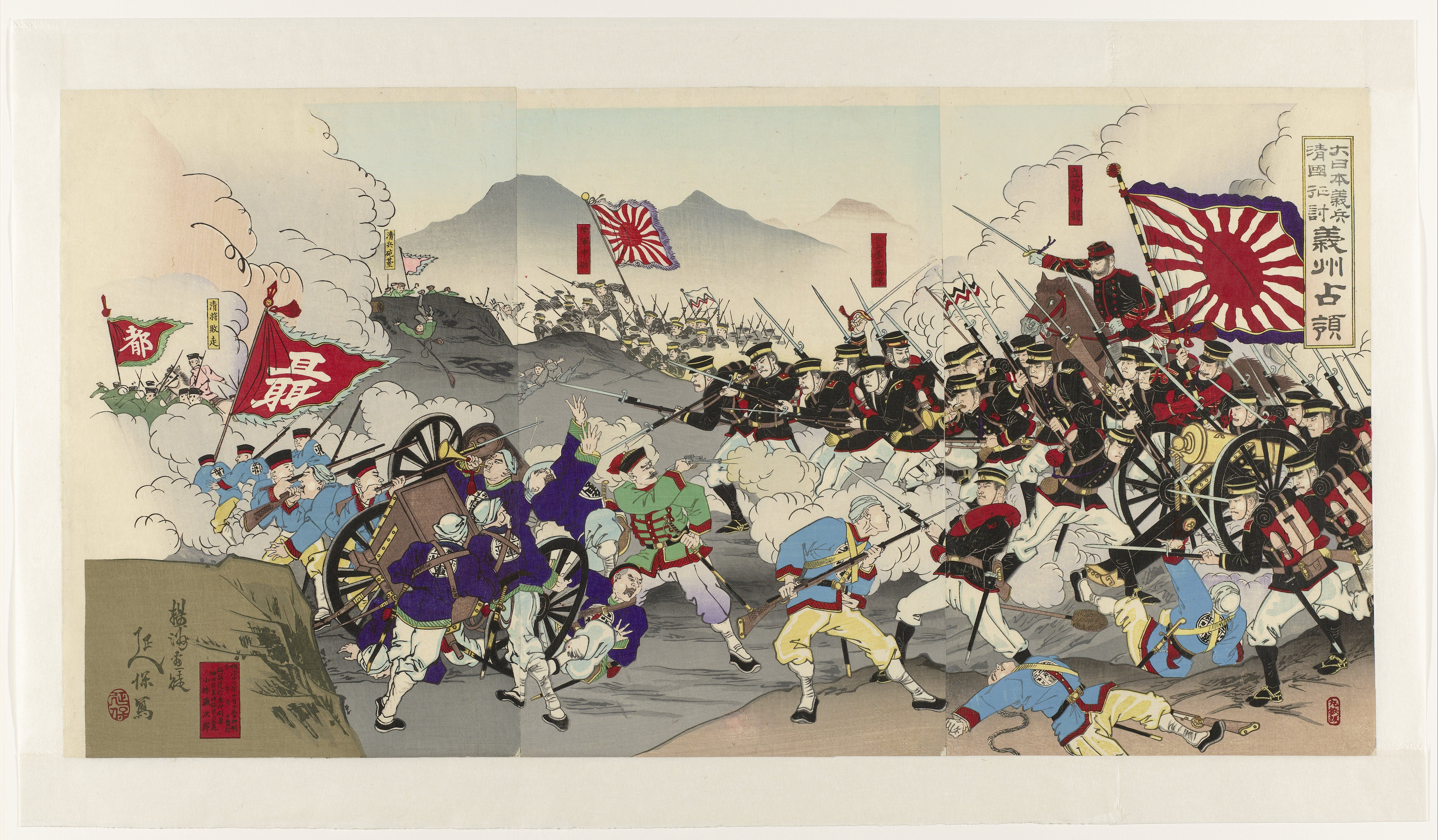
First Sino-Japanese War of 1894

Friction between China and Japan arose from the 1870s from Japan's control over the Ryukyu Islands, rivalry for political influence in Korea and trade issues. Japan, having built up a stable political and economic system with a smaller but modern and well-trained army and navy, easily defeated China in the First Sino-Japanese War of 1894. Japanese soldiers massacred the Chinese after capturing Port Arthur on the Liaodong Peninsula. In the harsh Treaty of Shimonoseki of April 1895, China recognized the independence of Korea, and ceded to Japan Taiwan (Taiwan), the Penghu Islands and the Liaodong Peninsula. China was further obligated to pay Japan a war indemnity of 200 million silver taels, open five new ports to international trade, and foreigner entities (Japan and other Western powers generally) to establish and operate factories in these cities. However, Russia, France, and Germany saw themselves disadvantaged by the treaty and in the Triple Intervention forced Japan to return the Liaodong Peninsula in return for a larger indemnity. The only positive result for China came when those factories led the industrialization of urban China, spinning off a local class of entrepreneurs and skilled mechanics.

==== Taiwan ====
The island of Taiwan (Formosa) had an indigenous population when Dutch traders in need of an Asian base to trade with Japan and China arrived in 1623. The Dutch East India Company (VOC) built Fort Zeelandia. They soon began to rule the natives. China took control in the 1660s, and sent in settlers. By the 1890s there were about 2.3 million Han Chinese and 200,000 members of indigenous tribes. After its victory in the First Sino-Japanese War in 1894–1895, the peace treaty ceded the island to Japan. It was Japan's first colony.

Japan expected far more benefits from the occupation of Taiwan than the limited benefits it actually received. Japan realized that its home islands could only support a limited resource base, and it hoped that Taiwan, with its fertile farmlands, would make up the shortage. By 1905, Taiwan was producing rice and sugar and paying for itself with a small surplus. Perhaps more important, Japan gained Asia-wide prestige by being the first non-European country to operate a modern colony. It learned how to adjust its German-based bureaucratic standards to actual conditions, and how to deal with frequent insurrections. The ultimate goal was to promote Japanese language and culture, but the administrators realized they first had to adjust to the Chinese culture of the people. Japan had a civilizing mission, and it opened schools so that the peasants could become productive and patriotic manual workers. Medical facilities were modernized and mortality rates plunged. To maintain order, Japan imposed a police state that closely monitored the civilian population. Unlike their other colonies, Formosa was intended to eventually be annexed into Metropolitan Japan and Taiwan even had seats in House of Peers. When Japan surrendered to the allies in 1945, it was stripped of her empire and Taiwan was returned to China after over 50 years of Japanese administration.

==== Japan defeats Russia, 1904–1905 ====
Japan felt humiliated when the spoils from its decisive victory over China were partly reversed by the Western powers (including Russia), which revised the Treaty of Shimonoseki. The Boxer Rebellion of 1899–1901 saw Japan and Russia as allies who fought together against the Chinese, with Russians playing the leading role on the battlefield. In the 1890s, Japan was angered at Russian encroachment on its plans to create a sphere of influence in Korea and Manchuria. Japan offered to recognize Russian dominance in Manchuria in exchange for recognition of Korea as being within the Japanese sphere of influence. Russia refused and demanded Korea north of the 39th parallel to be a neutral buffer zone between Russia and Japan. The Japanese government decided on war to stop the perceived Russian threat to its plans for expansion into Asia. The Imperial Japanese Navy opened hostilities by launching surprise attacks on the Russian Eastern Fleet at Port Arthur, China. Russia suffered multiple defeats but Tsar Nicholas II fought on with the expectation that Russia would win decisive naval battles. When that proved illusory he fought to preserve the dignity of Russia by averting a "humiliating peace". The complete victory of the Japanese military surprised world observers. The consequences transformed the balance of power in East Asia, resulting in a reassessment of Japan's recent entry onto the world stage. It was the first major military victory in the modern era of an Asian power over a European one.

==== Korea ====
In 1905, the Empire of Japan and the Korean Empire signed the Japan–Korea Treaty of 1905, which brought Korea into the Japanese sphere of influence as a protectorate. The Treaty was a result of the Japanese victory in the Russo-Japanese War and Japan wanting to increase its hold over the Korean Peninsula. It led to the signing of the 1907 Treaty two years later. The 1907 Treaty ensured that Korea would act under the guidance of a Japanese resident general and Korean internal affairs would be under Japanese control. Korean Emperor Gojong was forced to abdicate in favour of his son, Sunjong, as he protested Japanese actions in the Hague Conference. Finally in 1910, the Annexation Treaty formally annexed Korea to Japan.

=== Dividing up China ===
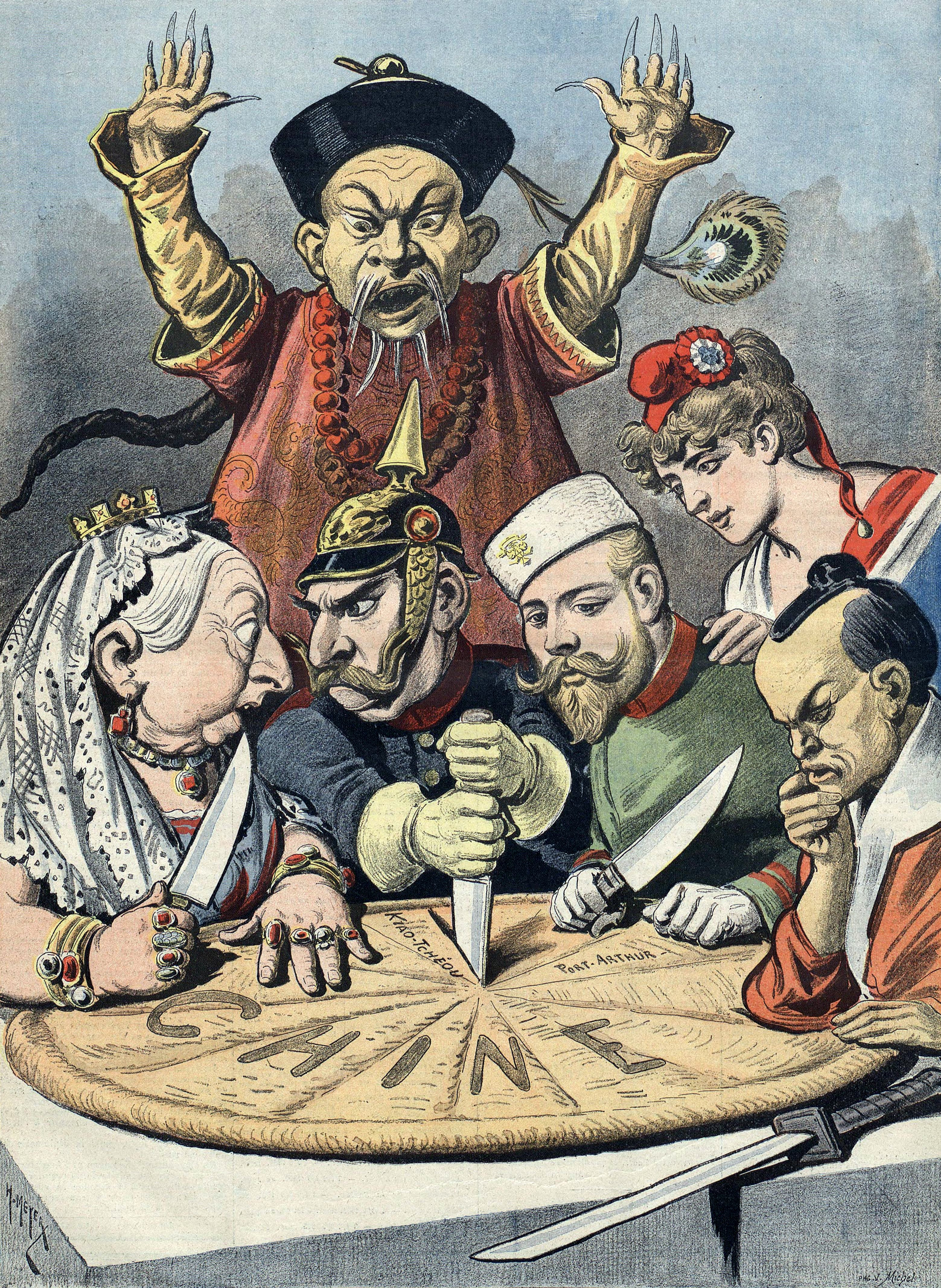
An 1898 French political cartoon depicting Britain, France, Russia, Germany, and Japan dividing China

During the 19th and 20th centuries, foreign powers practiced imperialism in China through the imposition of unequal treaties, opening of treaty ports, and establishment of foreign concessions and leased territories. Starting with the 1842 Treaty of Nanking following the Qing dynasty's defeat by Britain in the First Opium War, various foreign powers, including Britain, France, the United States, Russia, Germany, and Japan, forced China to concede sovereignty and in turn gained territorial, economic, and legal privileges from China. Chinese historians widely include China's subjugation to foreign powers as part of the "century of humiliation."

Within treaty ports, foreign powers controlled enclaves, known as concessions; and gained leases on territories that operated as de facto colonies. Foreign citizens in these areas were granted extraterritoriality, exempting them from Chinese legal jurisdiction in favor of their own consular courts. Foreign powers also maintained their own police forces, military garrisons, and independent taxation systems. The Scramble for China in the late 19th century saw a rapid acceleration of this process, as major powers carved out exclusive spheres of influence across the country, a trend only partially checked by the United States' Open Door Policy.

=== British policies ===
==== Free trade imperialism ====
Britain, in addition to taking control of new territories, developed an enormous power in economic and financial affairs in numerous independent countries, especially in Latin America and Asia. It lent money, built railways, and engaged in trade. The Great Exhibition of 1851 clearly demonstrated Britain's dominance in engineering, communications and industry; that lasted until the rise of the United States and Germany in the 1890s.

==== Splendid isolation ====
Historians agree that Lord Salisbury as foreign minister and prime minister 1885–1902 was a strong and effective leader in foreign affairs. He had a superb grasp of the issues, and proved:

a patient, pragmatic practitioner, with a keen understanding of Britain's historic interests....He oversaw the partition of Africa, the emergence of Germany and the United States as imperial powers, and the transfer of British attention from the Dardanelles to Suez without provoking a serious confrontation of the great powers.

In 1886–1902 under Salisbury, Britain continued its policy of splendid isolation with no formal allies. Lord Salisbury grew restless with the term in the 1890s, as his "third and final government found the policy of 'splendid isolation' increasingly less splendid," especially as France broke from its own isolation and formed an alliance with Russia.

==== Policy toward Germany ====
Britain and Germany each tried to improve relations, but British distrust of Kaiser Wilhelm II of Germany for his recklessness ran deep. The Kaiser did indeed meddle in Africa in support of the Boers, which soured relations.

The main accomplishment was a friendly 1890 treaty. Germany gave up its coastal territory in Kenya in Africa and acquired the Heligoland islands, off Hamburg, which were essential to the security of Germany's ports. Overtures toward friendship otherwise went nowhere, and a great Anglo-German naval arms race worsened tensions, 1880s–1910s.

==== Liberal Party splits on imperialism ====
Liberal Party policy after 1880 was shaped by William Gladstone as he repeatedly attacked Benjamin Disraeli's imperialism. The Conservatives took pride in their imperialism and it proved quite popular with the voters. A generation later, a minority faction of Liberals became active "Liberal Imperialists". The Second Boer War (1899 – 1902) was fought by Britain against and the two independent Boer republics of the Orange Free State and the South African Republic (called the Transvaal by the British). After a protracted hard-fought war, with severe hardships for Boer civilians, the Boers lost and were absorbed into the British Empire. The war bitterly divided with Liberals, with the majority faction denouncing it. Joseph Chamberlain and his followers broke with the Liberal Party and formed an alliance with the Conservatives to promote imperialism.

== The Eastern Question ==
Political history of the Balkans

The Eastern Question from 1870 to 1914 was the imminent risk of a disintegration of the Ottoman Empire. Attention focused on rising nationalism among Christian ethnics in the Balkans, especially as supported by Serbia. There was a high risk this would lead to major confrontations between Austria-Hungary and Russia, and between Russia and Great Britain. Russia especially wanted control of Constantinople in the straits connecting the Black Sea with the Mediterranean. British policy had long been to support the Ottoman Empire against Russian expansion. However, in 1876, William Gladstone added a new dimension escalated the conflict by emphasizing Ottoman atrocities against Christians in Bulgaria. The atrocities - plus Ottoman attacks on Armenians, and Russian attacks on Jews, attracted public attention across Europe and lessened the chances of quiet compromises.

=== Long-term goals ===
Each of the countries paid close attention to its own long-term interests, usually in cooperation with its allies and friends.

==== Ottoman Empire (Turkey) ====
The Ottoman Empire was hard-pressed by nationalistic movements among the Christian populations, As well as its laggard condition in terms of modern technology. After 1900, the large Arab population would also grow nationalistic. The threat of disintegration was real. Egypt for example although still nominally part of the Ottoman Empire, had been virtually independent for a century and was now under British control. Turkish nationalists were emerging, and the Young Turk movement indeed took over the empire. While the previous rulers had been pluralistic, the Young Turks were hostile to all other nationalities and to non-Muslims. Wars were usually defeats, in which another slice of territory was sliced off and became semi-independent, including Greece, Serbia, Montenegro, Bulgaria, Romania, Bosnia, and Albania.

==== Austro-Hungarian Empire ====
The Austro-Hungarian Empire, headquartered at Vienna, was a largely rural, poor, multicultural state. It was operated by and for the Habsburg family, who demanded loyalty to the throne, but not to the nation. Nationalistic movements were growing rapidly. The most powerful were the Hungarians, who preserved their separate status within the Habsburg monarchy with the Austro-Hungarian Compromise of 1867. Other minorities, were highly frustrated, although some – especially the Jews – felt protected by the Empire. German nationalists, especially in the Sudetenland (part of Bohemia) however, looked to Berlin in the new German Empire. There was a small German-speaking Austrian element located around Vienna, but it did not display much sense of Austrian nationalism. That is it did not demand an independent state, rather it flourished by holding most of the high military and diplomatic offices in the Empire. Russia was the main enemy, as well as Slavic and nationalist groups inside the Empire (especially in Bosnia-Herzegovina) and in nearby Serbia. Although Austria, Germany, and Italy had a defensive military alliance – the Triple Alliance – Italy was dissatisfied and wanted a slice of territory controlled by Vienna.

The second Mediterranean Agreements of 1895-1897 were a series of diplomatic alliance between Austria-Hungary and Great Britain, aimed at countering Russian expansion in the Balkans and securing Britain's interests. Count Goluchowski and Lord Salisbury, played a crucial role in these negotiations, which were influenced by the desire to maintain the Triple Alliance with Germany and to ensure the protection of the Straits of Constantinople. The agreements were a response to the growing influence of Russia in the region and were seen as a means to prevent further Russian expansion. However, the agreements effectiveness was ultimately limited by the complexities of the Eastern Question and the changing political landscape of Europe. These diplomatic exchanges culminated in the Austro-Russian agreement of 1897, which formalized a temporary détente in the Balkans and reflected Austria-Hungary’s cautious engagement with both Britain and Russia.

Gyula Andrássy after serving as Hungarian prime minister became Foreign Minister of Austria-Hungary (1871–1879). Andrássy was a conservative; his foreign policies looked to expanding the Empire into Southeast Europe, preferably with British and German support, and without alienating Turkey. He saw Russia as the main adversary, because of its own expansionist policies toward Slavic and Orthodox areas. He distrusted Slavic nationalist movements as a threat to his multi-ethnic empire. As tensions escalated in the early 20th century the Empire's foreign policy was set in 1906–1912 by its powerful foreign minister Count Alois Lexa von Aehrenthal. He was thoroughly convinced that the Slavic minorities could never come together, and the Balkan League would never accomplish any damage to Austria-Hungary. 1912 he rejected an Ottoman proposal for an alliance that would include Austria-Hungary, Turkey and Romania. His policies alienated the Bulgarians, who turned instead to Russia and Serbia. Although Austria-Hungary had no intention to embark on additional expansion to the south, Aehrenthal encouraged speculation to that effect, expecting it would paralyze the Balkan states. Instead, it incited them to feverish activity to create a defensive block to stop Austria-Hungary. A series of grave miscalculations at the highest level thus significantly strengthened Austria-Hungary's enemies.

==== Russia ====
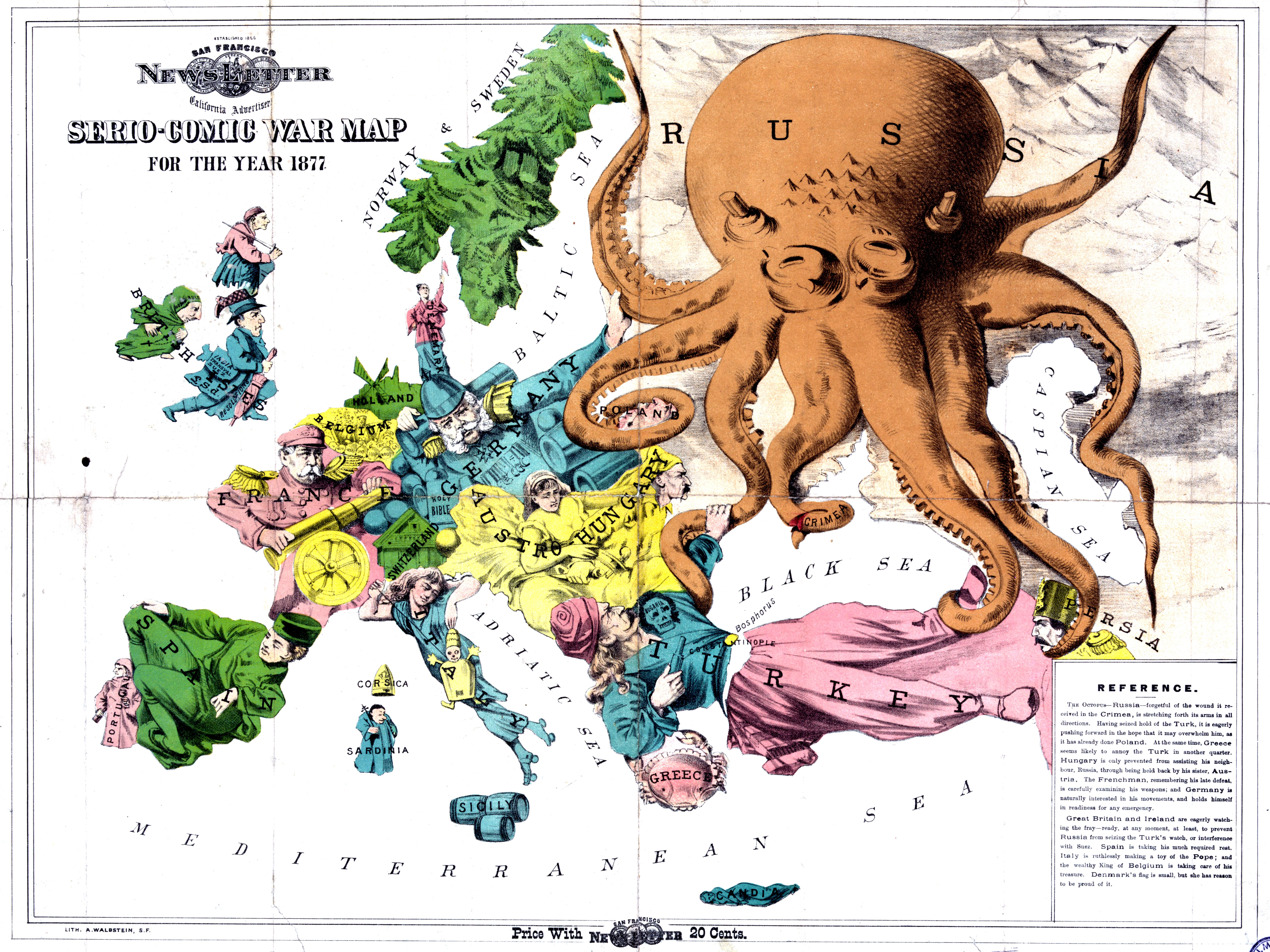
"The Russian menace: a Serio-Comic War Map for the Year 1877", an English cartoon from 1877 showing Russia as a monstrous octopus devouring neighbouring lands, especially the Ottoman Empire

Russia was growing in strength, and wanted access to the warm waters of the Mediterranean. To get that it needed control of the Straits, connecting the Black Sea and the Mediterranean, and if possible, control of Constantinople, the capital of the Ottoman Empire. Slavic nationalism was strongly on the rise in the Balkans. It gave Russia the opportunity to protect Slavic and Orthodox Christians. This put it in sharp opposition to the Austro-Hungarian Empire.

==== Serbia ====
The Kingdom of Serbia had multiple national goals. Serbian intellectuals dreamed of a South Slavic state—which in the 1920s became Yugoslavia. The large number of Serbs living in Bosnia looked to Serbia as the focus of their nationalism, but they were ruled by the Germans of the Austrian Empire. Austria-Hungary's annexation of Bosnia in 1908 deeply alienated the Serbian peoples. Plotters swore revenge, which they achieved in 1914 by assassination of the Austro-Hungarian heir. Serbia was landlocked, and strongly felt the need for access to the Mediterranean, preferably through the Adriatic Sea. Austria worked hard to block Serbian access to the sea, for example by helping with the creation of Albania in 1912. Montenegro, Serbia's main ally, did have a small port, but Austrian territory intervened, blocking access until Serbia acquired Novi Pazar and part of Macedonia from the Ottoman Empire in 1913. To the south, Bulgaria blocked Serbian access to the Aegean Sea. Serbia, Greece, Montenegro and Bulgaria formed the Balkan League and went to war with the Ottomans in 1912–1913. They won decisively and expelled that Empire from almost all of the Balkans. The main remaining foe was Austria-Hungary, which strongly rejected Pan-Slavism and Serbian nationalism and was ready to make war to end those threats. Ethnic nationalism would doom the multicultural Austro-Hungarian Empire. Expansion of Serbia would block Austrian and German aspirations for direct rail connections to Constantinople and the Middle East. Serbia relied primarily on Russia for Great Power support but Russia was very hesitant at first to support Pan-Slavism, and counselled caution. However, in 1914 it reversed positions and promised military support to Serbia.

==== Germany ====
Germany had no direct involvement in the Balkans, but indirectly Bismarck realized that it was a major source of tension between his two key allies, Russia and Austria-Hungary. Therefore, Germany's policy was to minimize conflict in the Balkans.

=== Great Eastern Crisis of 1875–1878 Turkey at war with Serbia and Russia ===
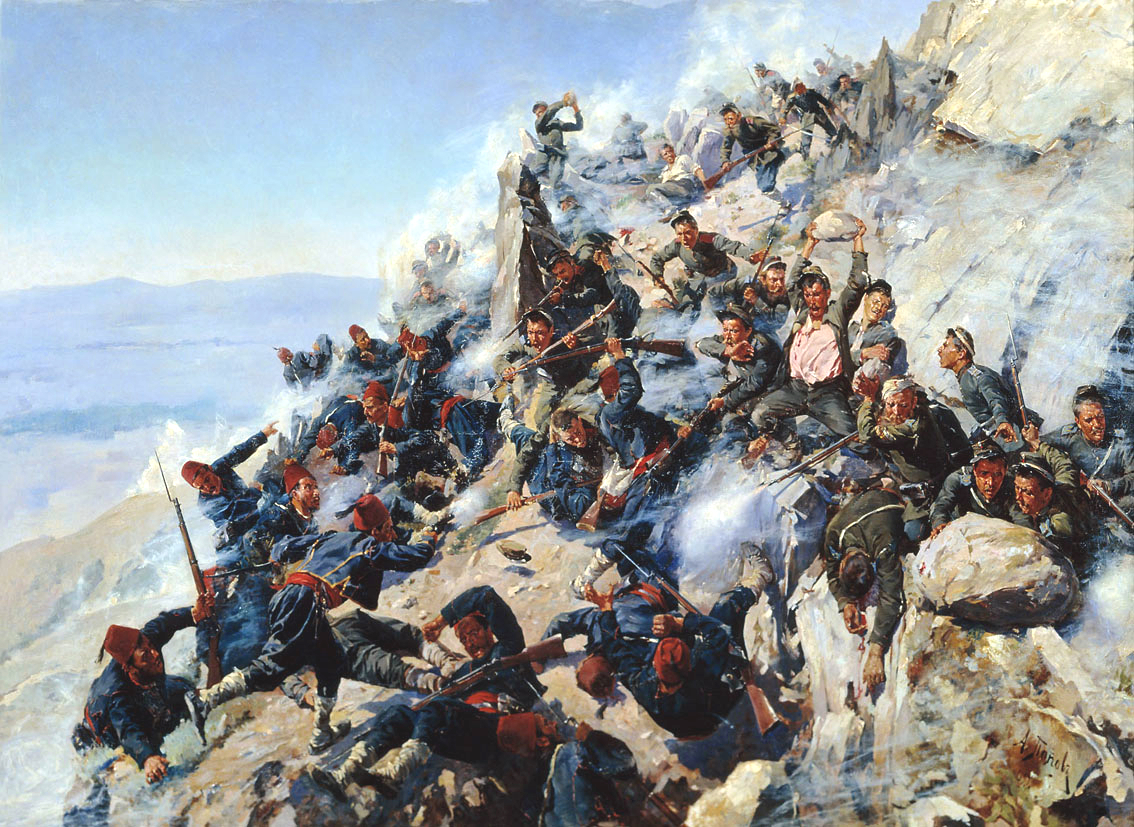
The Russian and Bulgarian defence of Shipka Pass against Turkish troops was crucial for the liberation of Bulgaria.

In 1876 Serbia and Montenegro declared war on Turkey, and were badly defeated, notably at the Battle of Alexinatz (1 September 1876). Gladstone published an angry pamphlet on "The Bulgarian Horrors and the Question of the East," which aroused enormous agitation in Britain against Turkish misrule, and complicated the Disraeli government's policy of supporting Turkey against Russia. Russia, which supported Serbia, threatened war against Turkey. In August 1877, Russia declared war on Turkey, and steadily defeated its armies. In early January 1878 Turkey asked for an armistice; the British fleet arrived at Constantinople too late. Russia and Turkey on 3 March signed the Treaty of San Stefano, which was highly advantageous to Russia, Serbia, and Montenegro, as well as Romania and Bulgaria.

=== Congress of Berlin ===
Britain, France, and Austria-Hungary opposed the Treaty of San Stefano because it gave Russia and Bulgaria too much influence in the Balkans, where insurrections were frequent. War threatened. After numerous attempts a grand diplomatic settlement was reached at the Congress of Berlin (June–July 1878). The new Treaty of Berlin revised the earlier treaty. Germany's Chancellor Otto von Bismarck presided over the congress and brokered the compromises. The Congress ended the strong ties between Germany and Russia and they became military rivals. The obvious weakness of the Ottoman Empire incited Balkan nationalism and encouraged Vienna to become a major player in Balkan alignments. In 1879 Bismarck moved to solidify the new alignment of power by engineering an alliance between Germany and Austria-Hungary.

Keeping ethnic groups together was not a priority when boundaries were drawn, thus creating new grievances between nationalistic ethnic groups. One result was that Austria-Hungary took control of the provinces of Bosnia and Herzegovina, intending to eventually merge them into the Austro-Hungarian Empire. Bosnia and Herzegovina was eventually annexed by Austria-Hungary in 1908, to the anger of Serbs. Bosnian Serbs assassinated Austria's heir to the crown, Franz Ferdinand, in 1914 and the result was the First World War.

=== Minority rights ===
The 1878 Treaty of Berlin had a new type of provision that protected minorities in the Balkans and newly independent states Great Power recognition was nominally conditional on the promise of guarantees of religious and civic freedoms for local religious minorities. Historian Carol Fink argues:

"the imposed clauses on minority rights became requirements not only for recognition but were also, as in the cases of Serbia, Montenegro, and Romania, conditions for receiving specific grants of territory."

Fink reports that these provisions were generally not enforced—no suitable mechanism existed and the Great Powers had little interest in doing so. Protections were part of the Treaty of Versailles in 1919 and became increasingly important after World War II.

=== British policies ===
Britain stayed aloof from alliances in the late 19th century, with an independence made possible by its island location, its dominant navy, its dominant position in finance and trade, and its strong industrial base. It rejected tariffs and practiced free trade. After losing power in Britain in 1874, Liberal leader Gladstone returned to center stage in 1876 by calling for a moralistic foreign policy, as opposed to the realism of his great adversary Benjamin Disraeli. The issue drew the party line between Gladstone's Liberals (who denounced the immoral Ottomans) and Disraeli's Conservatives (who downplayed the atrocities and supported the Ottoman Empire as an offset to Russian power). Disraeli had threatened war with Russia on the issue and Gladstone argued he was wrong. Liberal opinion was convulsed by atrocities in the Balkans, in particular the massacre of more than 10,000 Christian Bulgars by Turkish irregulars. Gladstone denounced the Turks for committing "abominable and bestial lusts ... at which Hell itself might almost blush" and demanded they withdraw from European soil "bag and baggage". His pamphlet sold an astonishing 200,000 copies.

The climax was his "Midlothian campaign" of 1880 when he charged Disraeli's government with financial incompetence, neglecting domestic legislation, and mismanagement of foreign affairs. Gladstone felt a call from God to aid the Serbians and Bulgarians (who were Eastern Orthodox Christians); he spoke out like an ancient Hebrew prophet denouncing tyranny and oppression. The real audience was not the local electorate but Britain as a whole, especially the evangelical elements. By appealing to vast audiences denouncing Disraeli's pro-Turkish foreign policy, Gladstone made himself a moral force in Europe, unified his party, and was carried back to power.

=== German policy, 1870–1890 ===
Chancellor Bismarck took full charge of German foreign policy from 1870 to his dismissal in 1890. His goal was a peaceful Europe, based on the balance of power, with Germany playing a central role; his policy was a success. Germany had the strongest economy on Continental Europe and the strongest military. Bismarck made clear to all that Germany had no wish to add any territory in Europe, and he tried to oppose German colonial expansion. Bismarck feared that a hostile combination of Austria-Hungary, France and Russia could overwhelm Germany. If two of them were allied, then the third would ally with Germany only if Germany conceded excessive demands. The solution was to ally with two of the three. In 1873 he formed the League of the Three Emperors, an alliance of the kaiser of Germany, the tsar of Russia, and the emperor of Austria-Hungary. It protected Germany against a war with France. The three emperors together could control Central and Eastern Europe, making sure that restive ethnic groups such as the Poles were kept in control. The Balkans posed a more serious issue, and Bismarck's solution was to give Austria predominance in the western areas, and Russia in the eastern areas. The system collapsed in 1887. Kaiser Wilhelm ousted Bismarck in 1890 and developed his own aggressive foreign policy. The Kaiser rejected the Russian alliance, and Russia in turn turned to an alliance with France.

==== "War in Sight" crisis of 1875 ====
Between 1873 and 1877, Germany repeatedly intervened in the internal affairs of France's neighbors. In Belgium, Spain, and Italy, Bismarck exerted strong and sustained political pressure to support the election or appointment of liberal, anticlerical governments. This was part of an integrated strategy to promote republicanism in France by strategically and ideologically isolating the clerical-monarchist regime of President Patrice de MacMahon. It was hoped that by ringing France with a number of liberal states, French republicans could defeat MacMahon and his reactionary supporters. The modern concept of containment provides a useful model for understanding the dynamics of this policy.

Containment almost got out of hand in 1875 in the Krieg-in-Sicht crisis. This crisis was sparked by an editorial in an influential Berlin daily newspaper, Die Post, titled "Ist Krieg in Sicht?" ("Is War in Sight?"). According to this editorial, some highly influential Germans — alarmed by France's rapid rearmament after its 1871 defeat — talked of launching a preemptive war against France. This caused a war scare in Germany and France. Britain and Russia made it clear they would not tolerate a preemptive war. Bismarck did not want any war either, but the unexpected crisis forced him to take into account the fear and alarm that his bullying and Germany's fast-growing power was causing among its neighbors. The crisis reinforced Bismarck's determination that Germany had to work in proactive fashion to preserve the peace in Europe, rather than passively react to events.

=== The alliance between Russia and France, 1894–1914 ===
The central development in Russian foreign policy was to move away from Germany and toward France. This became possible in 1890, when Bismarck was dismissed from office, and Germany refused to renew the secret 1887 Reinsurance Treaty with Russia. That encouraged Russian expansion into Bulgaria and the Straits. It meant that both France and Russia were without major allies; France took the initiative and funding Russian economic development, and in exploring a military alliance. Russia had never been friendly with France, and remembered the wars in the Crimea and the Napoleonic invasion; it saw republican France as a dangerous font of subversion to Russia's Tsarist autocracy. France, which had been shut out of the entire alliance system by Bismarck, decided to improve relations with Russia. It lent money to the Russians, expanded trade, and began selling warships after 1890. Meanwhile, after Bismarck lost office in 1890, there was no renewal of the Reinsurance treaty between Russia and Germany. The German bankers stopped lending to Russia, which increasingly depended on Paris banks.

In 1894 a secret treaty stipulated that Russia would come to the aid of France if France was attacked by Germany. Another stipulation was that in a war against Germany, France would immediately mobilize 1.3 million men, while Russia would mobilize 700,000 to 800,000. It provided that if any of the Triple Alliance (Germany, Austria-Hungary, Italy) mobilized its reserves in preparation for war, then both Russia and France would mobilize theirs. "The mobilization is the declaration of war," the French chief of staff told Tsar Alexander III in 1892. "To mobilize is to oblige one's neighbor to do the same." This set up the tripwire for July 1914.

George F. Kennan argues that Russia was primarily responsible for the collapse of Bismarck's alliance policy in Europe, and starting the downward slope to the First World War. Kennan blames poor Russian diplomacy centered on its ambitions in the Balkans. Kennan says Bismarck's foreign policy was designed to prevent any major war even in the face of improved Franco-Russian relations. Russia left Bismarck's Three Emperors' League (with Germany and Austria) and instead took up the French proposal for closer relationships and a military alliance.

== Balkan crises: 1908–1913 ==
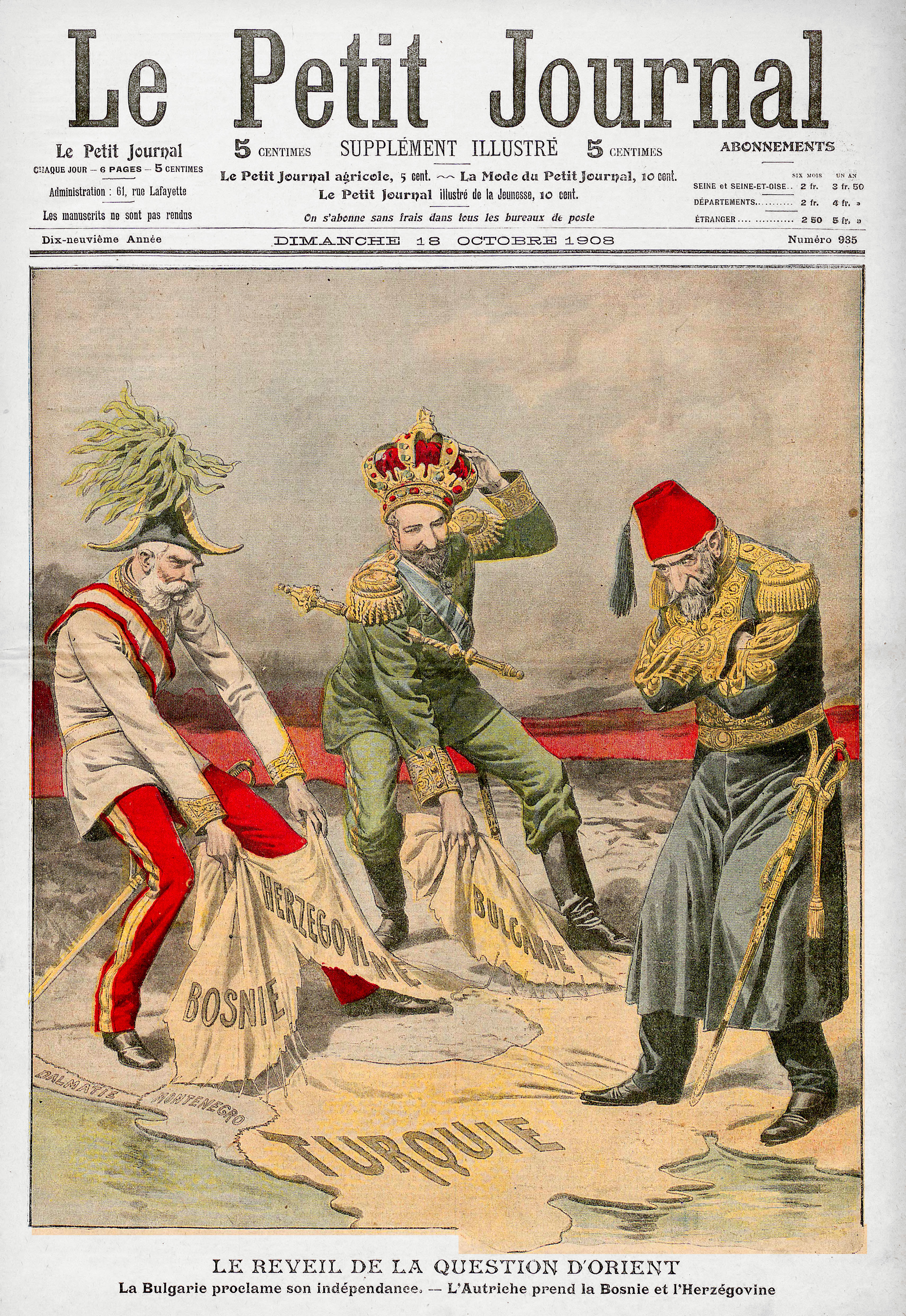
Cover of the French periodical Le Petit Journal on the Bosnian Crisis: Prince Ferdinand of Bulgaria declares independence and is proclaimed Tsar, and the Austrian Emperor Franz Joseph annexes Bosnia and Herzegovina, while the Ottoman Sultan Abdul Hamid II looks on.

=== Bosnian Crisis of 1908–1909 ===
The Bosnian Crisis of 1908–1909 began on 8 October 1908, when Vienna announced the annexation of Bosnia and Herzegovina. These territories were nominally part of the Ottoman Empire but had been awarded in custody to Austria-Hungary in the Congress of Berlin in 1878. This unilateral action—timed to coincide with Bulgaria's declaration of independence (5 October) from the Ottoman Empire—sparked protestations from all the Great Powers and especially Serbia and Montenegro. In April 1909 the Treaty of Berlin was amended to reflect the fait accompli and bring the crisis to an end. The crisis permanently damaged relations between Austria-Hungary on one hand and Serbia, Italy and Russia on the other. At the time it appeared to be a total diplomatic victory for Vienna, but Russia became determined not to back down again and hastened its military build-up. Austro-Hungarian–Serbian relations became permanently stressed. It aroused intense anger among Serbian nationalists that led to the assassination of Franz Ferdinand in 1914.

=== Balkan Wars ===
The continuing collapse of the Ottoman Empire led to two wars in the Balkans, in 1912 and 1913, which were a prelude to World War I. By 1900 nation states had formed in Bulgaria, Greece, Montenegro and Serbia. Nevertheless, many of their ethnic compatriots lived under the control of the Ottoman Empire. In 1912, these countries formed the Balkan League. There were three main causes of the First Balkan War. The Ottoman Empire was unable to reform itself, govern satisfactorily, or deal with the rising ethnic nationalism of its diverse peoples. Secondly, the Great Powers quarreled among themselves and failed to ensure that the Ottomans would carry out the needed reforms. This led the Balkan states to impose their own solution. Most important, the members of the Balkan League were confident that it could defeat the Turks. Their prediction was accurate, as Constantinople called for terms after six weeks of fighting.

The First Balkan War broke out when the League attacked the Ottoman Empire on 8 October 1912 and ended seven months later with the Treaty of London, 1913. After five centuries, the Ottoman Empire lost virtually all of its possessions in the Balkans. The Treaty had been imposed by the Great Powers, and the victorious Balkan states were dissatisfied with it. Bulgaria was dissatisfied over the division of the spoils in Macedonia, made in secret by its former allies, Serbia and Greece. Bulgaria attacked to force them out of Macedonia, beginning the Second Balkan War. The Serbian and Greek armies repulsed the Bulgarian offensive and counter-attacked into Bulgaria, while Romania and the Ottoman Empire also attacked Bulgaria and gained (or regained) territory. In the resulting Treaty of Bucharest, Bulgaria lost most of the territories it had gained in the First Balkan War.

The long-term result was heightened tension in the Balkans. Relations between Austria and Serbia became increasingly bitter. Russia felt humiliated after Austria and Germany prevented it from helping Serbia. Bulgaria and Turkey were also dissatisfied, and eventually joined Austria and Germany in the First World War.

== Coming of World War I ==
European diplomatic alignments in 1914; Italy was neutral in 1914 and switched to the Entente in 1915.

The main causes of World War I, which broke out unexpectedly in central Europe in summer 1914, included many factors, such as the conflicts and hostility of the four decades leading up to the war. Militarism, alliances, imperialism, and ethnic nationalism played major roles. However the immediate origins of the war lay in the decisions taken by statesmen and generals during the Crisis of 1914, which was sparked by the assassination of Archduke Franz Ferdinand (the Archduke of Austria Hungary) by a Serbian secret organization, the Black Hand.

=== Germany fears encirclement ===
Berlin focused on a supposed conspiracy of its enemies: that year-by-year in the early 20th century it was systematically encircled by enemies. There was a growing fear in Berlin that the supposed enemy coalition of Russia, France and Britain was getting stronger militarily every year, especially Russia. The longer Berlin waited the less likely it would prevail in a war. According to American historian Gordon A. Craig, "it was after this set-back in Morocco in 1905 that the fear of encirclement began to be a potent factor in German politics." Few outside observers agreed with the notion of Germany as a victim of deliberate encirclement. English historian G. M. Trevelyan expressed the British viewpoint:

The encirclement, such as it was, was of Germany's own making. She had encircled herself by alienating France over Alsace-Lorraine, Russia by her support of Austria-Hungary's anti-Slav policy in the Balkans, England by building her rival fleet. She had created with Austria-Hungary a military bloc in the heart of Europe so powerful and yet so restless that her neighbors on each side had no choice but either to become her vassals or to stand together for protection....They used their central position to create fear in all sides, in order to gain their diplomatic ends. And then they complained that on all sides they had been encircled.

=== Mobilizing armies ===
By the 1870s or 1880s, all the major powers were preparing for a large-scale war, although none expected one. Britain focused on building up its Royal Navy, already stronger than the next two navies combined. Germany, France, Austria, Italy and Russia, and some smaller countries, set up conscription systems whereby young men would serve from 1 to 3 years in the army, then spend the next 20 years or so in the reserves with annual summer training. Men from higher social statuses became officers.

Each country devised a mobilisation system whereby the reserves could be called up quickly and sent to key points by rail. Every year the plans were updated and expanded in terms of complexity. Each country stockpiled arms and supplies for an army that ran into the millions.

Germany in 1874 had a regular professional army of 420,000 with an additional 1.3 million reserves. By 1897 the regular army was 545,000 strong and the reserves 3.4 million. The French in 1897 had 3.4 million reservists, Austria-Hungary 2.6 million, and Russia 4.0 million. The various national war plans had been perfected by 1914, albeit with Russia and Austria-Hungary trailing in effectiveness. All plans called for a decisive opening and a short war.

=== France ===
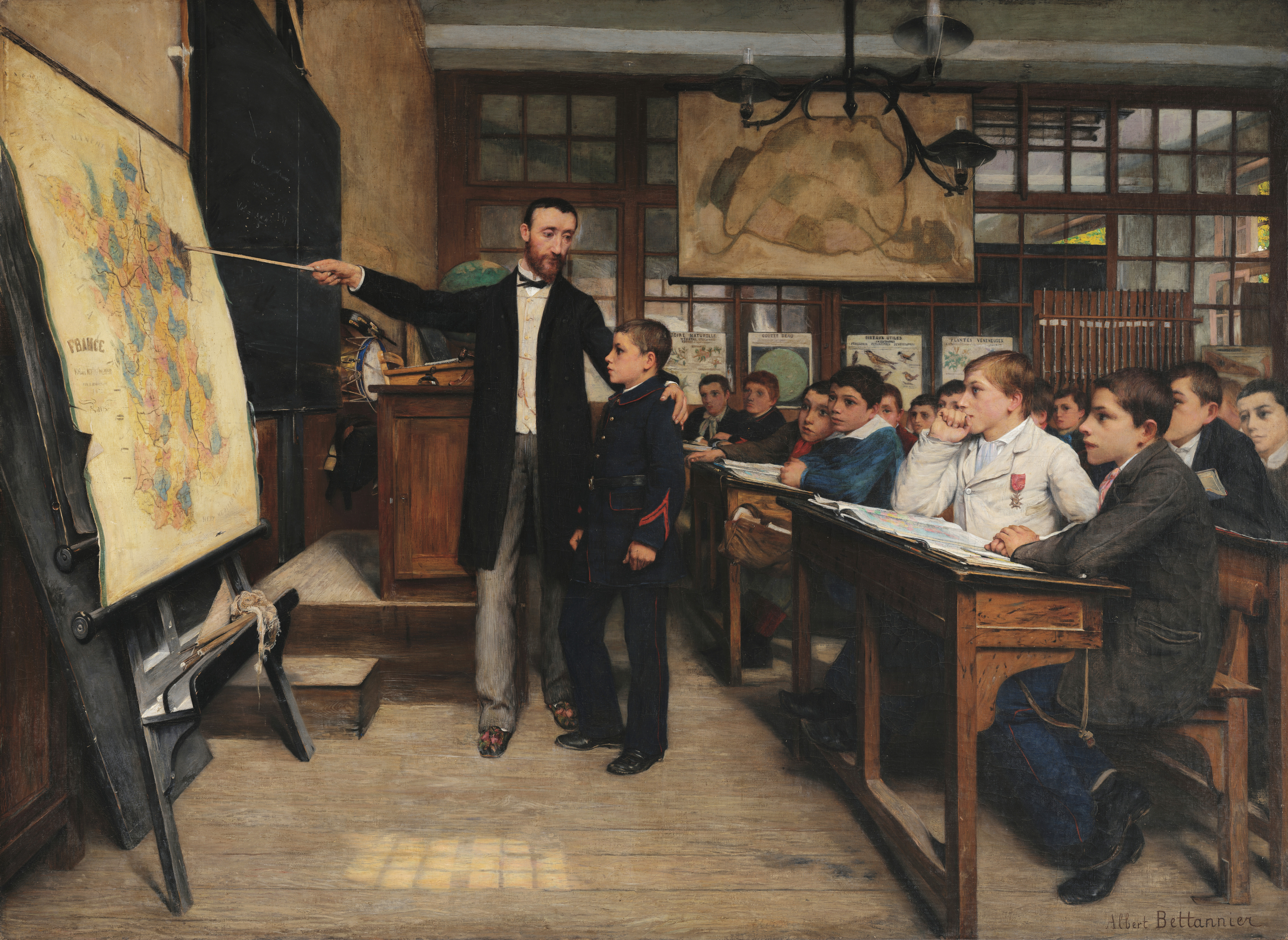
French students are taught about the provinces of Alsace-Lorraine, taken by Germany in 1871.

For a few years after its defeat in 1871 France displayed a bitter Revanchism: a deep sense of bitterness, hatred and demand for revenge against Germany, especially because of the loss of Alsace-Lorraine. Paintings that emphasized the humiliation of the defeat came in high demand, such as those by Alphonse de Neuville.

French policy makers were not fixated on revenge. However strong public opinion regarding Alsace-Lorraine meant that friendship with Germany was impossible unless the provinces were returned, and public opinion in Germany would not allow a return to happen. So Germany worked to isolate France and France sought allies against Germany, especially Russia and Britain. Apart perhaps from the German threat, most French citizens ignored foreign affairs and colonial issues. In 1914 the chief pressure group was the Parti colonial, a coalition of 50 organizations with a combined total of 5000 members.

France had colonies in Asia and looked for alliances and found in Japan a possible ally. At Japan's request Paris sent military missions in 1872–1880, in 1884–1889 and in 1918–1919 to help modernize the Imperial Japanese Army. Conflicts with China over Indochina climaxed during the Sino-French War (1884–1885). Admiral Amédée Courbet destroyed the Chinese fleet anchored at Fuzhou. The treaty ending the war, put France in a protectorate over northern and central Vietnam, which it divided into Tonkin and Annam.

Bismarck's foreign policies had successfully isolated France from the other great powers. After Bismarck was fired, Kaiser Wilhelm took erratic positions that baffled diplomats. No one could quite figure out his goals. Germany ended its secret treaties with Russia, and rejected close ties with Britain. France saw its opportunity, as Russia was looking for a new partner and French financiers invested heavily in Russian economic development. In 1893 Paris and St. Petersburg signed an alliance. France was no longer isolated – but Germany was increasingly isolated and distrusted, with only Austria-Hungary as a serious ally. The Triple Alliance included Germany, Austria-Hungary, and Italy, but Italy had serious disputes with Austria-Hungary, and switched sides when the world war erupted. Britain was also moving toward alliances, having abandoned its policy of splendid isolation. By 1903, France settled its disputes with Britain. After Russia and Britain settled their disputes over Persia in the 1907 Anglo-Russian Convention, the way was open for the Triple Entente of France, Britain, and Russia. It formed the basis of the Allies of the First World War.

==== Franco-Russian Alliance ====
France was deeply split between the monarchists on one side, and the republicans on the other. The republicans at first seemed highly unlikely to welcome any military alliance with Russia. That large nation was poor and not industrialized; it was intensely religious and authoritarian, with no sense of democracy or freedom for its peoples. It oppressed Poland, and exiled, and even executed political liberals and radicals. At a time when French Republicans were rallying in the Dreyfus affair against anti-Semitism, Russia was the most notorious center in the world of anti-Semitic outrages, including multiple murderous large-scale pogroms against the Jews. On the other hand, France was increasingly frustrated by Bismarck's success in isolating it diplomatically. France had issues with Italy, which was allied with Germany and Austria-Hungary in the Triple Alliance. Paris made a few overtures to Berlin, but they were rebuffed, and after 1900 there was a threat of war between France and Germany over Germany's attempt to deny French expansion into Morocco. Great Britain was still in its "splendid isolation" mode and after a major agreement in 1890 with Germany, it seemed especially favorable toward Berlin. Colonial conflicts in Africa brought Britain and France to a major crisis: the Fashoda crisis of 1898 brought Britain and France to the brink of war and ended with a humiliation of France that left it hostile to Britain. By 1892 Russia was the only opportunity for France to break out of its diplomatic isolation. Russia had been allied with Germany: the new Kaiser, Wilhelm, removed Bismarck in 1890 and in 1892 ended the "Reinsurance treaty" with Russia. Russia was now alone diplomatically and like France, it needed a military alliance to contain the threat of Germany's strong army and military aggressiveness. The pope, angered by German anti-Catholicism, worked diplomatically to bring Paris and St. Petersburg together. Russia desperately needed money for railway infrastructure and port facilities. The German government refused to allow its banks to lend money to Russia, but French banks eagerly did so. For example, it funded the essential Trans-Siberian Railway. Negotiations were increasingly successful, and by 1895. France and Russia had signed the Franco-Russian Alliance, a strong military alliance to join in war if Germany attacked either of them. France had finally escaped its diplomatic isolation.

In its continuing effort to isolate Germany, France went to great pains to woo Great Britain, notably in the 1904 Entente Cordiale, and finally the Anglo-Russian Entente in 1907, which became the Triple Entente. Paris and London had a high-level military discussion about coordination in a joint war against Germany. By 1914, Russia and France worked together, and Britain was hostile enough toward Germany to join them as soon as Germany invaded Belgium.

==== Anglo-German relations deteriorate: 1880–1904 ====
In the 1880s relations between Britain and Germany improved as the key policy-makers, Prime Minister Lord Salisbury and Chancellor Bismarck were both realistic conservatives and largely in agreement on policies. There were several proposals for a formal treaty relationship between Germany and Britain, but they went nowhere; Britain preferred to stand in what it called "splendid isolation". Nevertheless, a series of developments steadily improved their relations down to 1890, when Bismarck was fired by the aggressive new Kaiser Wilhelm II. In January 1896 he escalated tensions with his Kruger telegram congratulating Boer President Paul Kruger of the Transvaal for beating off the Jameson raid. German officials in Berlin had managed to stop the Kaiser from proposing a German protectorate over the Transvaal. In the Second Boer War, Germany sympathised with the Boers. In 1897 Admiral Alfred von Tirpitz became German Naval Secretary of State and began the transformation of the Imperial German Navy from small, coastal defence force to a fleet meant to challenge British naval power. Tirpitz calls for Riskflotte (Risk Fleet) that would make it too risky for Britain to take on Germany as part of wider bid to alter the international balance of power decisively in Germany's favour. At the same time German foreign minister Bernhard von Bülow called for Weltpolitik (World politics). A German Attache', where the German Ambassador goes to Britain to discuss the possibility of an Anglo-German alliance. Baron Hermann von Eckardstein, German diplomat, Eckardstein brokered a meeting between Secretary of State for the Colonies Joseph Chamberlain. The negotiations took place primarily between 1898 and 1903. It was the new policy of Germany to assert its claim to be a global power. Bismarck's conservatism was abandoned as Germany was intent on challenging and upsetting the international order. Thereafter relations deteriorated steadily. London began to see Berlin as a hostile force and moved to friendlier relationships with France.

==== Two crises in Morocco ====
Morocco on the northwest coast of Africa, was the last major territory in Africa not controlled by colonial power. Morocco nominally was ruled by its sultan. But in 1894 the child Abdelaziz of Morocco took the throne, and soon died leaving chaos. By 1900, Morocco was the scene of multiple local wars started by pretenders to the sultanate, by bankruptcy of the treasury, and by multiple tribal revolts. No one was in charge. The French Foreign Minister Théophile Delcassé saw the opportunity to stabilize the situation and expand the French overseas empire. General Hubert Lyautey wanted a more aggressive military policy using his French army based in Algeria. France decided to use both diplomacy and military force. With British approval, it would control the Sultan, ruling in his name and extending French control. British approval was received in the Entente Cordiale of 1904. Germany did not want Morocco itself, but felt embarrassed that France was making gains while Germany was not. On 31 March 1905, Germany's Kaiser Wilhelm II visited Morocco's capital, Tangier, and delivered a sabre-rattling speech demanding an international conference to ensure Morocco's independence, with war the alternative. Germany's goal in the First Moroccan Crisis was to enhance its prestige and diminish the Entente Cordiale linking Britain and France. Historian Heather Jones argues that Germany's use of warlike rhetoric was a deliberate diplomatic ploy:

Another German strategy was to stage dramatic gestures, and dangerously play up the threat of war, in the belief that this would impress upon other European powers the importance of consultation with Germany on imperial issues: the fact that France had not considered it necessary to make a bilateral agreement with Germany over Morocco rankled, especially given Germany was deeply insecure about its newly acquired Great Power status. Hence Germany opted for an increase in belligerent rhetoric and, theatrically, Kaiser Wilhelm II dramatically interrupted a Mediterranean cruise to visit Tangier, where he declared Germany's support for the Sultan's independence and integrity of his kingdom, turning Morocco overnight into an international 'crisis.' Germany's plan backfired when Britain made it clear that in the event of a German attack on France, Britain would intervene on France's side. In 1906 the Algeciras Conference ended the crisis with a stinging diplomatic defeat for Germany as France gained the dominant role in Morocco. The experience brought London and Paris much closer and set up the presumption they would be allies if Germany attacked either one. The German adventure resulted in failure as Germany was left more isolated and alienated. A momentous consequence was the heightened sense of frustration and readiness for war in Germany. It spread beyond the political elite to much of the press and most of the political parties except for the Liberals and Social Democrats on the left. The Pan-German element grew in strength and denounced their government's retreat as treason, stepping up chauvinistic support for war.

In the Agadir Crisis of 1911, France used force to seize more control over Morocco. The German Foreign Minister Alfred von Kiderlen-Waechter was not opposed to these moves, but he felt Germany was entitled to some compensation elsewhere in Africa. He sent a small warship, made saber-rattling threats, and whipped up anger among German nationalists. France and Germany soon agreed on a compromise. However, the British cabinet was alarmed at Germany's aggressiveness toward France. David Lloyd George made a dramatic "Mansion House" speech that denounced the German move as an intolerable humiliation. There was talk of war, and Germany backed down. Relations between Berlin and London remained sour.

=== British-German naval race ===
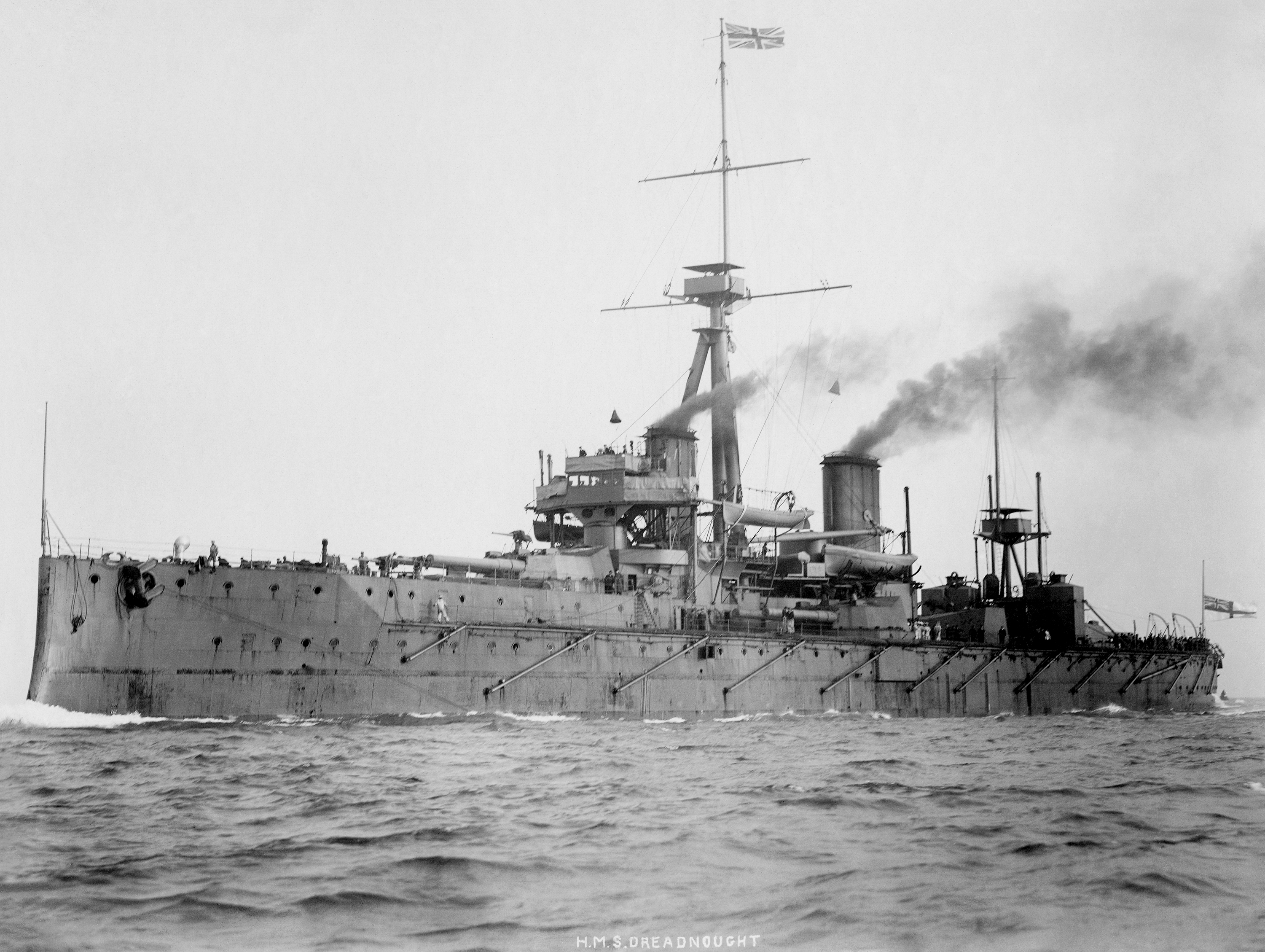
The British Dreadnought (1906) made all battleships obsolete because it had ten long-range 12-inch big guns, mechanical computer-like range finders, high speed turbine engines that could make 21 knots, and armour plates 11 inches thick.

After 1805 the dominance of Britain's Royal Navy was unchallenged; in the 1890s, Germany decided to match it. Grand Admiral Alfred von Tirpitz (1849 – 1930) dominated German naval policy from 1897 until 1916. Before the German Empire formed in 1871, Prussia never had a sizeable navy, nor did the other German states. Tirpitz turned the modest little fleet into a world-class force that could threaten the British Royal Navy. The British responded with new technology typified by the Dreadnought revolution, and remained in the lead.

The Imperial German Navy was not strong enough to confront the British in World War I; the one great naval Battle of Jutland failed to end Britain's control of the seas or break the stifling blockade. Germany turned to submarine warfare. The laws of war required an effort be made to allow passengers and crew to board lifeboats before sinking a ship. The Germans disregarded the law and in the most dramatic episode sank the Lusitania in 1915 in a few minutes. The U.S. demanded it stop, and Germany did so. Admiral Henning von Holtzendorff (1853–1919), chief of the admiralty staff, argued successfully in early 1917 to resume the attacks and thus starve the British. The German high command realized the resumption of unrestricted submarine warfare meant war with the United States but calculated that American mobilization would be too slow to stop a German victory on the Western Front.

== The Great War ==
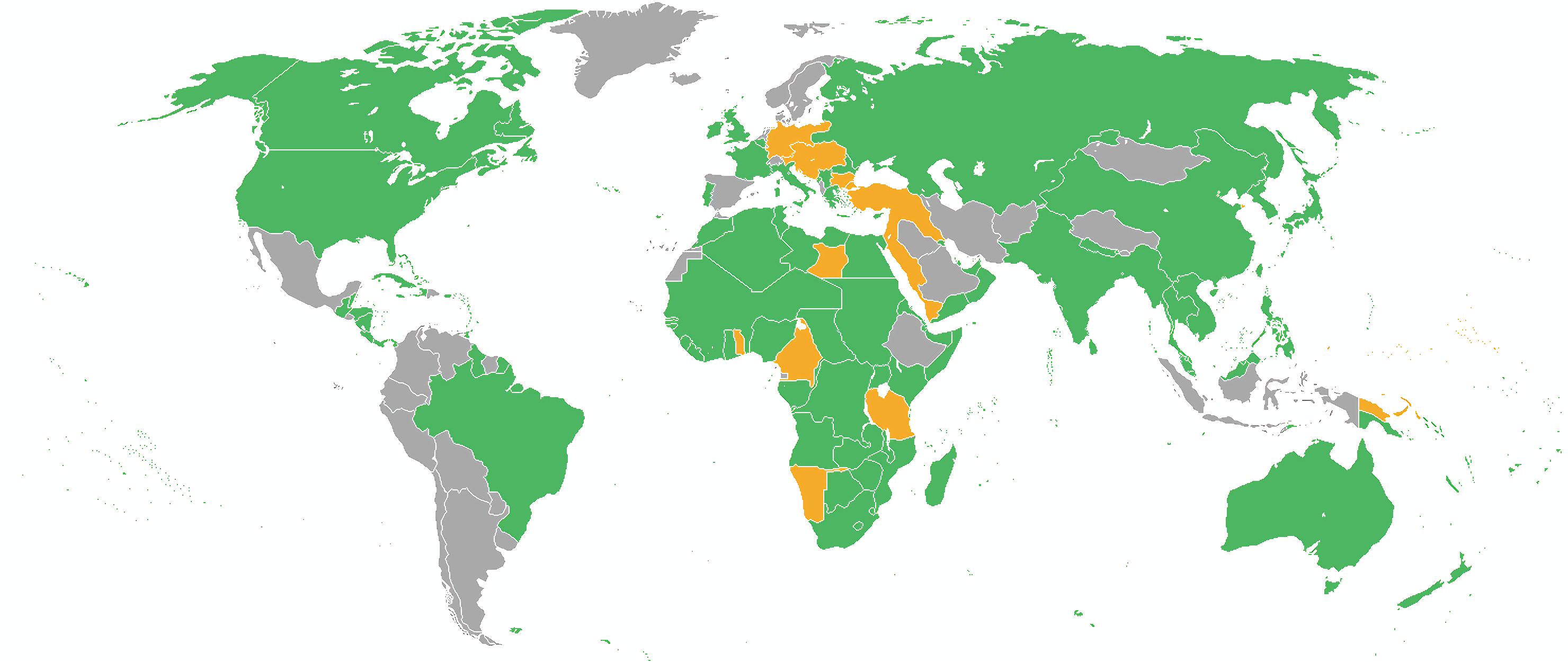
The participants in World War I. Those fighting alongside the Allies are in green, the Central Powers in orange, and neutral countries in grey.

The First World War was a global conflict that lasted from 1914 to 1918. It saw the Central Powers (Germany and Austria-Hungary, later joined by the Ottoman Empire and Bulgaria), fighting the "Entente" or "Allied" powers, led by Britain, Russia and France from 1914, who were later joined by Italy in 1915, and other countries such as Romania in 1916. The United States, initially neutral, tried to broker a settlement but in April, 1917, it declared war on Germany. The U.S. cooperated with the Allies but did not formally join them, and it negotiated peace separately. Despite overcoming Romania in 1916 (although Romania continued to fight until May 1918, later rejoining the war in November 1918) and Russia in March 1918, the Central Powers collapsed in November, 1918; and Germany accepted an armistice that in practice was a total surrender. Much of the diplomatic efforts of the major powers was oriented toward pushing neutral countries into the alliance with promises of rich territorial rewards. Britain, the United States and Germany spent large sums funding their allies. Propaganda campaigns to maintain morale at home and undermine morale in the enemy camp, especially among minorities, were a priority for the major powers. They also engaged in subversion, by subsidizing political groups that try to overthrow the enemy regime, as the Bolsheviks did in Russia in 1917. Both sides made secret agreements with neutrals to entice them into joining the war in return for a slice of enemy territory after victory was achieved. Some land was promised to several nations, so some promises therefore had to be broken. That left permanent bitter legacies, especially in Italy. Blaming the war in part on secret treaties, President Wilson called in his Fourteen Points for "open covenants, openly arrived at".

== 1919: Paris Peace Conference and Versailles Treaty ==
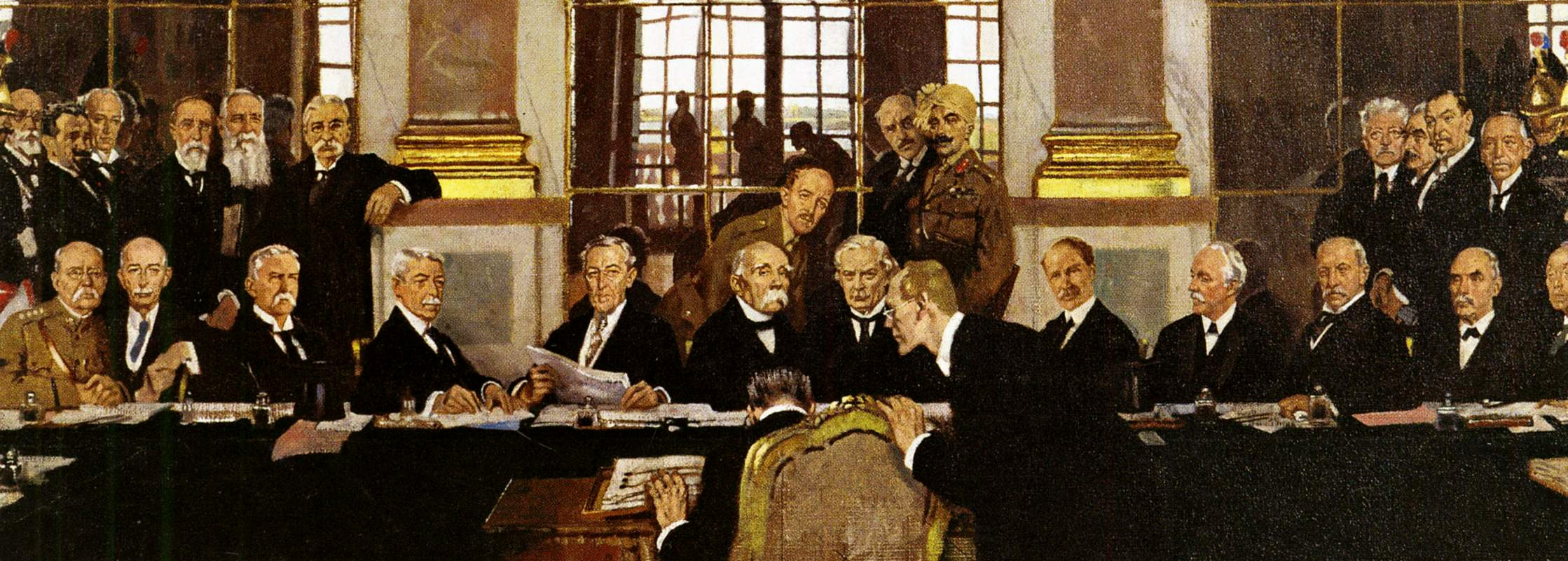
Detail from William Orpen's painting The Signing of Peace in the Hall of Mirrors, Versailles, 28th June 1919, showing the signing of the peace treaty by a minor German official opposite to the representatives of the winning powers

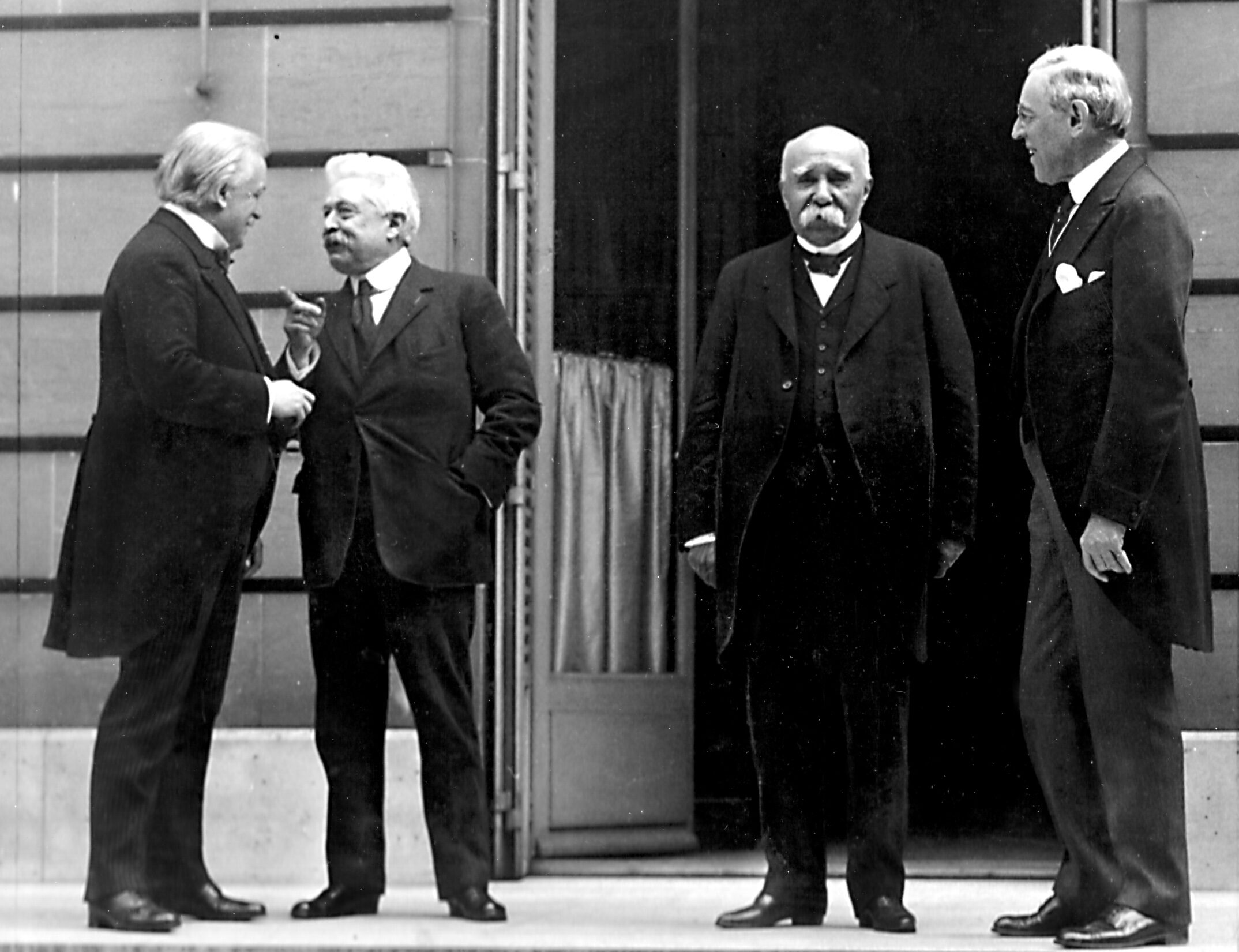
The "Big Four" at the Paris Peace Conference of 1919: David Lloyd George, Vittorio Emanuele Orlando, Georges Clemenceau, and Woodrow Wilson

The world war was settled by the victors at the Paris Peace Conference in 1919. 27 nations sent delegations, and there were many nongovernmental groups, but the defeated powers were not invited.

The "Big Four" were President Woodrow Wilson of the United States, Prime Minister David Lloyd George of Great Britain, Georges Clemenceau of France, and Italian Prime Minister Vittorio Orlando. They met together informally 145 times and made all the major decisions, which in turn were ratified by the others.

The major decisions were the creation of the League of Nations; the five peace treaties with defeated enemies (most notably the Treaty of Versailles with Germany); heavy reparations imposed on Germany; the awarding of German and Ottoman overseas possessions as "mandates", chiefly to Britain and France; and the drawing of new national boundaries (sometimes with plebiscites) to better reflect the forces of nationalism. In the "guilt clause" (section 231), the war was blamed on "aggression by Germany and her allies." Germany only paid a small fraction of the reparations before they were suspended in 1931.

== See also ==
- International relations (1648–1814)
- Diplomatic history of World War I
  - Causes of World War I
    - Historiography of the causes of World War I
    - Color books, official documents on causes of World War I released by each nation
- International relations (1919–1939)
- List of modern great powers
- History of the foreign relations of the United Kingdom
  - Timeline of British diplomatic history
  - Pax Britannica
  - British Empire#Britain's imperial century (1815–1914)
  - Historiography of the British Empire
- Historical assessment of Klemens von Metternich, Austrian diplomacy 1803-1848
- History of French foreign relations
- History of German foreign policy
- Foreign policy of the Russian Empire
- History of United States foreign policy
- Great Eastern Crisis, 1875 – in the Ottoman Empire's territories on the Balkan peninsula
- New Imperialism
- History of colonialism
- Concert of Europe
- Timeline of imperialism
- European balance of power

== Primary sources ==
- Bourne, Kenneth. The foreign policy of Victorian England, 1830–1902 (Oxford UP, 1970.) pp. 195–504 are 147 selected documents
- Cooke, W. Henry, and Edith P. Stickney, eds. Readings in European International Relations Since 1879 (1931) 1060 pp online
- Gooch, G. P. Recent Revelations of European Diplomacy (1940); 475 pp detailed summaries of memoirs from all the major belligerents; online
- Joll, James, ed. Britain and Europe 1793–1940 (1967); 390 pp of documents
- Jones, Edgar Rees, ed. Selected speeches on British foreign policy, 1738–1914 (1914). online free
- Kertesz, G. A. ed Documents in the Political History of the European Continent 1815–1939 (1968), pp. 1–385; 200 short documents
- Lowe, C. J. The reluctant imperialists: vol 2: The Documents (1967), 140 documents 1878–1902. (American edition 1969 vol 1 and 2 bound together).
- Lowe, C. J. and M. L. Dockrill, eds. The Mirage of Power: Volume 3: The Documents British Foreign Policy, 1902–22. (1972), 191 documents.
- Temperley, Harold and L. M. Penson, eds. Foundations of British Foreign Policy: From Pitt (1792) to Salisbury (1902) (1938) online, 608 pp of primary sources
- Walker, Mack. ed. Metternich's Europe, 1813–48 (1968) 352 pp of primary sources in English translation excerpt
