= Allies of World War I =

Military coalition in World War I

Allied Powers; Entente Cordiale
- 1914–1918
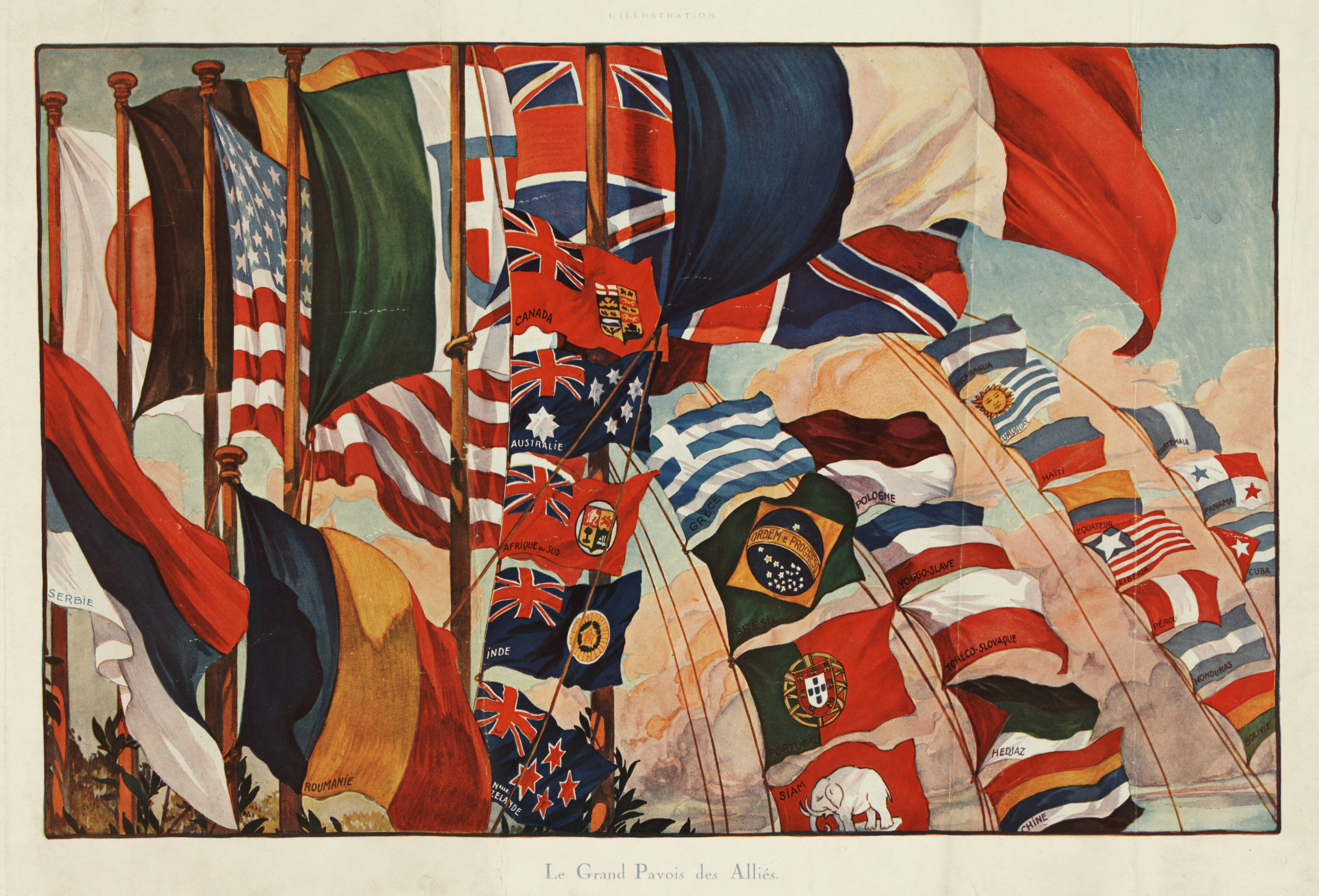
- 1918 French poster, depicting the national flags of the Allies
- Status: Military alliance
- Membership: French Republic; British Empire; • United Kingdom; • Canada; • Australia; • South Africa; • New Zealand; • Newfoundland; • India; Kingdom of Italy (from 1915); Russian Empire (until 1917); United States (from 1917); Empire of Japan; (See: § Affiliated state combatants.)
- Historical era: World War I
  - Established: 1914
  - Disestablished: 1918
| Preceded by | Succeeded by |
| Concert of Europe | League of Nations |

The Allies or the Entente (UK: /ɒ̃ˈtɒ̃t/, US: /ɒnˈtɒnt/ on-TONT) was an international military coalition of countries led by the French Republic, the United Kingdom, the Russian Empire, the United States, the Kingdom of Italy, and the Empire of Japan against the Central Powers of the German Empire, Austria-Hungary, the Ottoman Empire, and the Tsardom of Bulgaria in World War I (1914–1918).

By the end of the first decade of the 20th century, the major European powers were divided between the Triple Entente and the Triple Alliance. The Triple Entente was made up of the United Kingdom, France, and Russia. The Triple Alliance was originally composed of Germany, Austria–Hungary, and Italy, but Italy remained neutral in 1914. As the war progressed, each coalition added new members. Japan joined the Entente in 1914 and, despite proclaiming its neutrality at the beginning of the war, Italy also joined the Entente in 1915. The term "Allies" became more widely used than "Entente", although the United Kingdom, France, Russia, and Italy were also referred to as the Quadruple Entente and, together with Japan, as the Quintuple Entente. The five British Dominions (the Commonwealth of Australia, the Dominion of Canada, the Dominion of New Zealand, the Dominion of Newfoundland, and the Union of South Africa) all fought alongside the British. The colonies of Allied countries, such as the American Philippines, Belgian Congo, British India, French Algeria, and Japanese Korea, were also used as a source of manpower by the colonial powers.

The United States joined near the end of the war in 1917 (the same year in which Russia withdrew from the conflict) as an "associated power" rather than an official ally. Primary reasons for why the United States joined the war include the unrestricted submarine warfare waged by Germany in the Atlantic, the revelation of the Zimmermann telegram, and strong economic and political ties with the Allies. Other "associated members" of the Allies included Serbia, Belgium, Montenegro, Asir, Nejd and Hasa, Portugal, Romania, Hejaz, Panama, Cuba, Greece, China, Siam, Brazil, Armenia, Luxembourg, Guatemala, Nicaragua, Costa Rica, Haiti, Liberia, and Honduras. The treaties signed at the Paris Peace Conference recognised the British Empire, France, Italy, Japan, and the United States as "the Principal Allied and Associated Powers"; France, the UK, Italy, and the US were also referred as the "Big Four" top powers of the war.

== Background ==
When the war began in 1914, the Central Powers were opposed by the Triple Entente, formed in 1907 when the agreement between the United Kingdom and Russia complemented existing agreements between the three powers.

Fighting commenced when Austria invaded Serbia on 28 July 1914, in response to the assassination of Archduke Franz Ferdinand, heir to Emperor Franz Joseph I; this brought Serbia's ally Montenegro into the war on 9 August and it attacked the Austrian naval base at Cattaro, modern Kotor. At the same time, German troops carried out the Schlieffen Plan, entering neutral Belgium and Luxembourg; over 95% of Belgium was occupied but the Belgian Army held their lines on the Yser Front throughout the war. This allowed Belgium to be treated as an Ally, in contrast to Luxembourg, which retained control over domestic affairs but was occupied by the German military.

In the East, between 7 and 9 August, the Russians entered German East Prussia and Austrian Eastern Galicia. Japan joined the Entente by declaring war on Germany on 23 August, then Austria on 25 August. On 2 September, Japanese forces surrounded the German Treaty Port of Tsingtao (now Qingdao) in China and occupied German colonies in the Pacific, including the Mariana, Caroline, and Marshall Islands.

Despite its membership of the Triple Alliance, Italy remained neutral until 23 May 1915, when it joined the Entente, declaring war on Austria but not Germany. On 17 January 1916, Montenegro capitulated and left the Entente; this was offset when Germany declared war on Portugal in March 1916, while Romania commenced hostilities against Austria on 27 August.

On 6 April 1917, the United States entered the war as a co-belligerent, along with the associated allies of Liberia, Siam and Greece. After the 1917 October Revolution, Russia left the Entente and agreed to a separate peace with the Central Powers with the signing of the Treaty of Brest-Litovsk on 3 March 1918. Romania was forced to do the same in the May 1918 Treaty of Bucharest but on 10 November, it repudiated the Treaty and once more declared war on the Central Powers.

These changes meant the Allies who negotiated the Treaty of Versailles in 1919 included the United Kingdom, France, Italy, Japan and the United States; Part One of the Treaty agreed to the establishment of the League of Nations on 25 January 1919. This came into being on 16 January 1920 with Britain, France, Italy and Japan as permanent members of the Executive Council; the US Senate voted against ratification of the treaty on 19 March, thus preventing the United States from joining the League.

== Statistics ==
For similar statistics of the Central Powers, see Central Powers#Statistics.

Statistics of the Allied Powers (1913) and enlisted soldiers during the war
| Country | | Population (millions) | Land (million km^{2}) | GDP ($ billion, 1990 prices) | Mobilised personnel |
First Wave (1914)
| Russian Empire | Russia (inc. Congress Poland and Vistula Land) | 173.2 | 21.7 | 257.7 | 12,000,000 |
| Russian Empire | Finland | 3.2 | 0.4 | 6.6 | 12,000,000 |
| Russian Empire | Total | 176.4 | 22.1 | 264.3 | 12,000,000 |
| French Republic | France | 39.8 | 0.5 | 138.7 | 8,410,000 |
| French Republic | French colonies | 48.3 | 10.7 | 31.5 | 8,410,000 |
| French Republic | Total | 88.1 | 11.2 | 170.2 | 8,410,000 |
| British Empire | United Kingdom | 46.0 | 0.3 | 226.4 | 6,211,922 |
| British Empire | British colonies | 380.2 | 13.5 | 257 | 1,440,437 |
| British Empire | British Dominions | 19.9 | 19.5 | 77.8 | 1,307,000 |
| British Empire | Total | 446.1 | 33.3 | 561.2 | 8,689,000 |
| Empire of Japan | Japan | 55.1 | 0.4 | 76.5 | 800,000 |
| Empire of Japan | Japanese colonies | 19.1 | 0.3 | 16.3 | 800,000 |
| Empire of Japan | Total | 74.2 | 0.7 | 92.8 | 800,000 |
| Serbia, Montenegro, and Bosnia and Herzegovina | | 7.0 | 0.2 | 7.2 | 760,000 |
Second Wave (1915–1916)
| Kingdom of Italy | Italy | 35.6 | 0.3 | 91.3 | 5,615,000 |
| Kingdom of Italy | Italian colonies | 2.0 | 2.0 | 1.3 | 5,615,000 |
| Kingdom of Italy | Total | 37.6 | 2.3 | 92.6 | 5,615,000 |
| Portuguese Republic | Portugal | 6.0 | 0.1 | 7.4 | 100,000 |
| Portuguese Republic | Portuguese colonies | 8.7 | 2.4 | 5.2 | 100,000 |
| Portuguese Republic | Total | 14.7 | 2.5 | 12.6 | 100,000 |
| Kingdom of Romania | | 7.7 | 0.1 | 11.7 | 750,000 |
Third Wave (1917–1918)
| United States of America | United States | 96.5 | 7.8 | 511.6 | 4,355,000 |
| United States of America | overseas dependencies | 9.8 | 1.8 | 10.6 | 4,355,000 |
| United States of America | Total | 106.3 | 9.6 | 522.2 | 4,355,000 |
| Costa Rica, Cuba, Guatemala, Haiti, Honduras, Nicaragua and Panama | | 9.0 | 0.6 | 10.6 | |
| Republic of the United States of Brazil | | 25.0 | 8.5 | 20.3 | 1,713 |
| Kingdom of Greece | | 4.8 | 0.1 | 7.7 | 230,000 |
| Kingdom of Siam | | 8.4 | 0.5 | 7.0 | 1,284 |
| Republic of China | | 441.0 | 11.1 | 243.7 | |
| Republic of Liberia | | 1.5 | 0.1 | 0.9 | |

Aggregate statistics of the Allied Powers (in 1913)
| Group | Population (millions) | Territory (million km^{2}) | GDP ($ billion) |
November 1914
| Allies, total | 793.3 | 67.5 | 1,096.5 |
| UK, France and Russia only | 259.0 | 22.6 | 622.8 |
November 1916
| Allies, total | 853.3 | 72.5 | 1,213.4 |
| UK, France and Russia only | 259.0 | 22.6 | 622.8 |
November 1918
| Allies, total | 1,271.7 | 80.8 | 1,760.5 |
| Percentage of world | 70% | 61% | 64% |
| UK, France and US only | 182.3 | 8.7 | 876.6 |
| Percentage of world | 10% | 7% | 32% |
| Central Powers | 156.1 | 6.0 | 383.9 |
| World, 1913 | 1,810.3 | 133.5 | 2,733.9 |

== Principal powers ==
=== British Empire ===
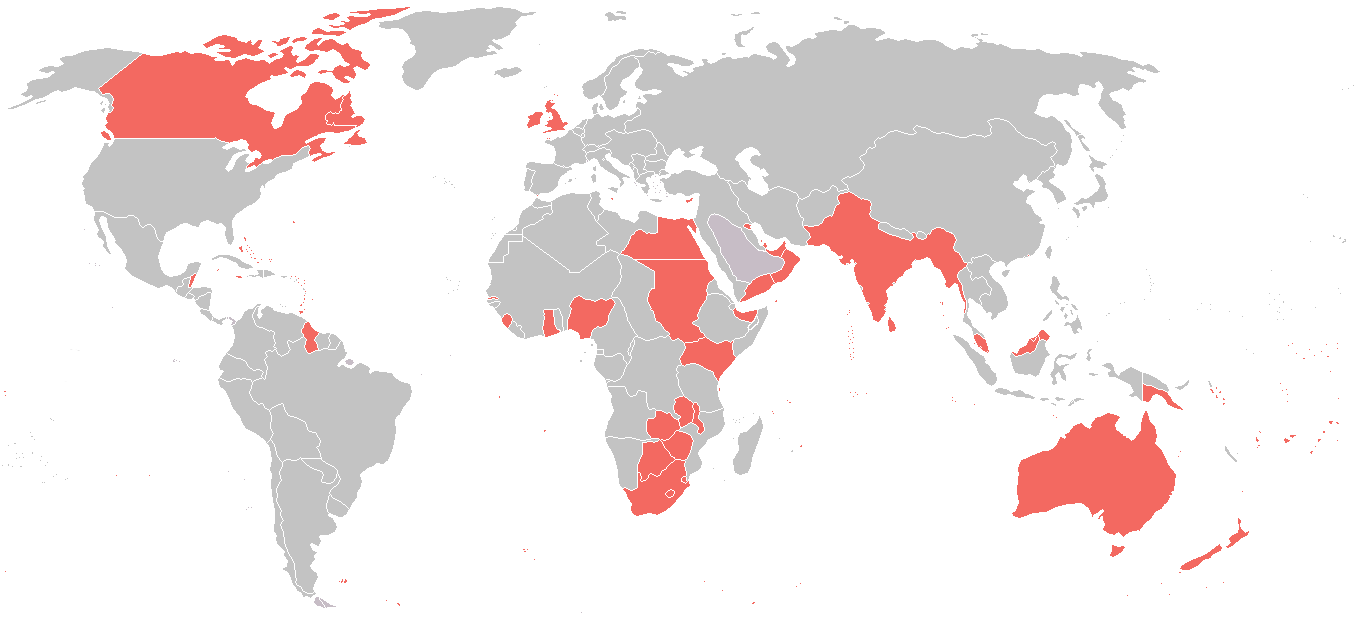
The British Empire in 1914

For much of the 19th century, Britain sought to maintain the European balance of power without formal alliances, a policy known as splendid isolation. This left it dangerously exposed as Europe divided into opposing power blocs. In response, the 1895–1905 Conservative government negotiated first the 1902 Anglo-Japanese Alliance, then the 1904 Entente Cordiale with France. The first tangible result of this shift was British support for France against Germany in the 1905 Moroccan Crisis.

The 1905–1915 Liberal government continued this re-alignment with the 1907 Anglo-Russian Convention. Like the Anglo-Japanese and Entente agreements, it focused on settling colonial disputes but by doing so paved the way for wider co-operation and allowed Britain to refocus resources in response to German naval expansion.

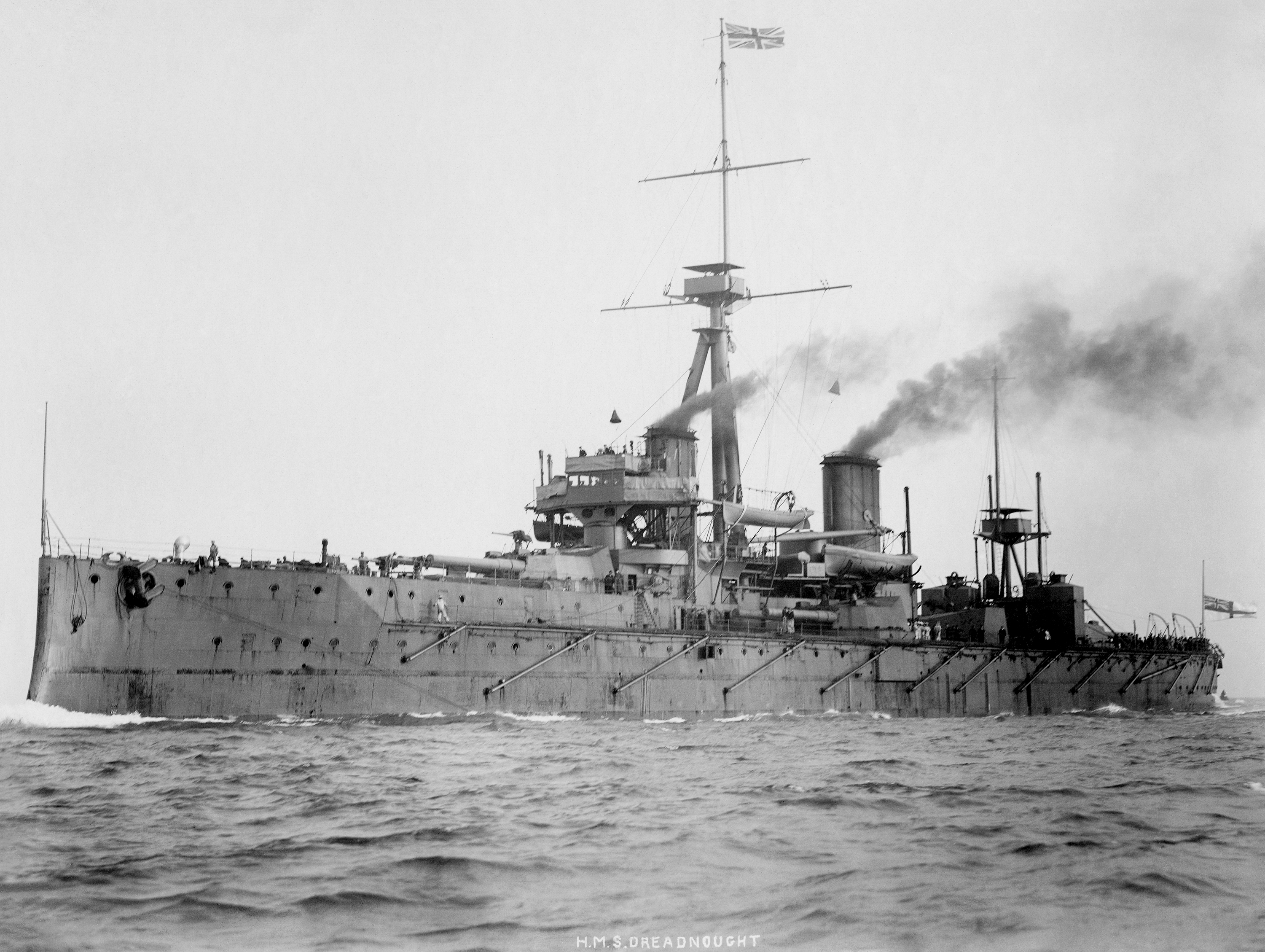
HMS Dreadnought; the 1902, 1904 and 1907 agreements with Japan, France and Russia allowed Britain to refocus resources during the Anglo-German naval arms race.

Since control of Belgium allowed an opponent to threaten invasion or blockade British trade, preventing it was a long-standing British strategic interest. (Note: The consequences were demonstrated when Germany controlled these areas during 1940–1944.) Under Article VII of the 1839 Treaty of London, Britain guaranteed Belgian neutrality against aggression by any other state, by force if required. Chancellor Theobald von Bethmann Hollweg later dismissed this as a 'scrap of paper,' but British law officers routinely confirmed it as a binding legal obligation and its importance was well understood by Germany.

The 1911 Agadir Crisis led to secret discussions between France and Britain in case of war with Germany. They agreed that, within two weeks of its outbreak, a British Expeditionary Force of 100,000 men would be landed in France; in addition, the Royal Navy would be responsible for the North Sea, the Channel and protecting Northern France, with the French navy concentrated in the Mediterranean. Britain was committed to support France in a war against Germany but this was not widely understood outside government or the upper ranks of the military.

As late as 1 August, a clear majority of the Liberal government and its supporters wanted to stay out of the war. While Liberal leaders H. H. Asquith and Edward Grey considered Britain legally and morally committed to support France regardless, waiting until Germany triggered the 1839 Treaty provided the best chance of preserving Liberal party unity.

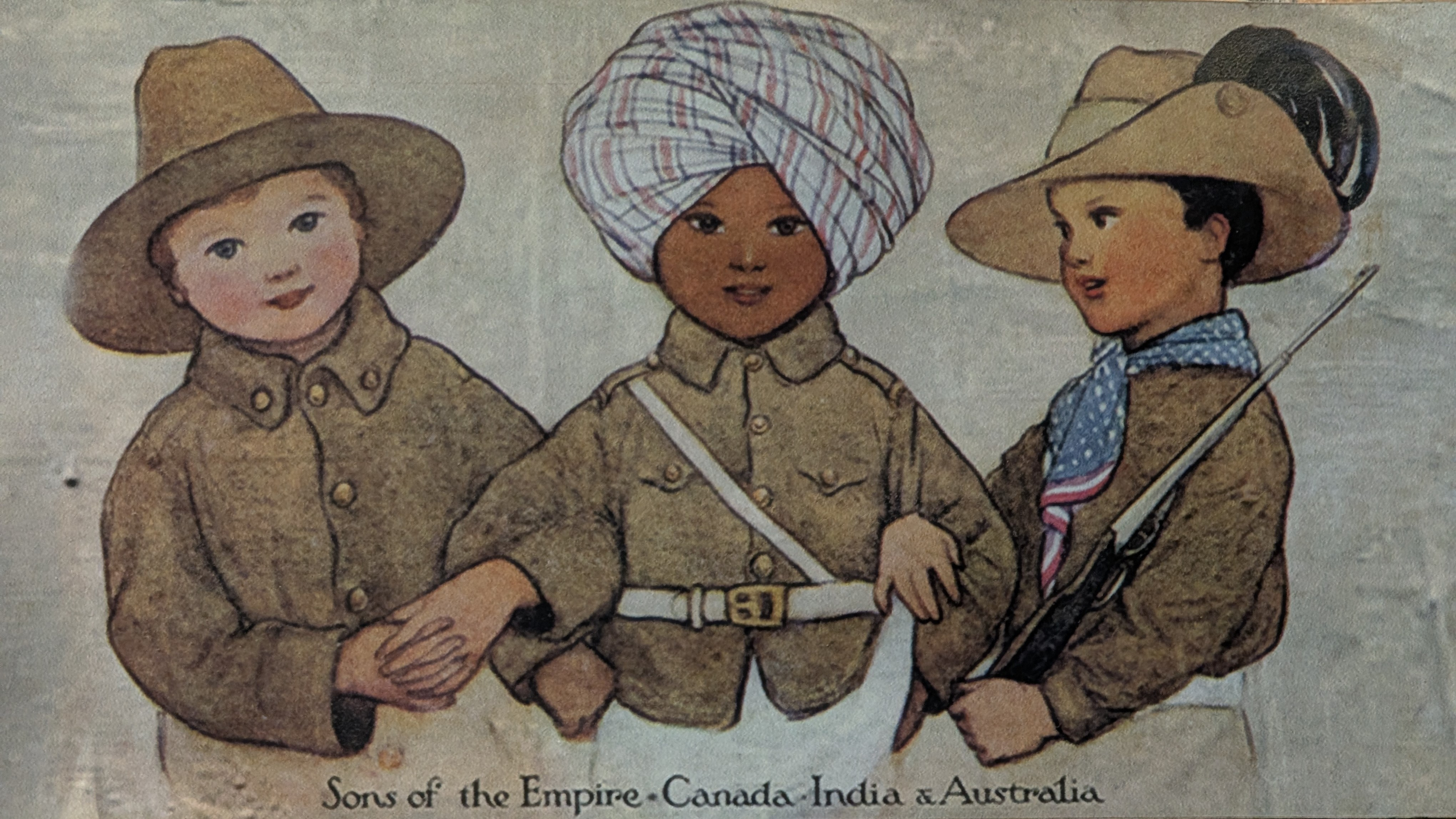
A propaganda postcard captioned 'Sons of the Empire; Canada, India & Australia'

The German high command was aware entering Belgium would lead to British intervention but decided the risk was acceptable; they expected a short war while their ambassador in London claimed troubles in Ireland would prevent Britain from assisting France. On 3 August, Germany demanded unimpeded progress through any part of Belgium and when this was refused, invaded early on the morning of 4 August.

This changed the situation; the invasion of Belgium consolidated political and public support for the war by presenting what appeared to be a simple moral and strategic choice. The Belgians asked for assistance under the 1839 Treaty and in response, Britain declared war on Germany on 4 August 1914. Although Germany's violation of Belgian neutrality was not the only cause of British entry into the war, it was used extensively in government propaganda at home and abroad to make the case for British intervention. This confusion arguably persists today.

The declaration of war automatically involved all Dominions, colonies, and protectorates of the British Empire, many of whom made significant contributions to the Allied war effort, both in the provision of troops and civilian labourers. It was split into Crown Colonies administered by the Colonial Office in London, such as Nigeria, (Note: Others included Gibraltar, Cyprus, Malta, East Africa Protectorate, Nyasaland, Northern and Southern Rhodesia, the Uganda Protectorate, the Gold Coast, Nigeria, British Honduras, the Falkland Islands, British Guiana, the British West Indies, British Malaya, North Borneo, Ceylon and Hong Kong.) and the self-governing Dominions of Australia, Canada, New Zealand, Newfoundland, and South Africa. These controlled their own domestic policies and military expenditure but not foreign policy.

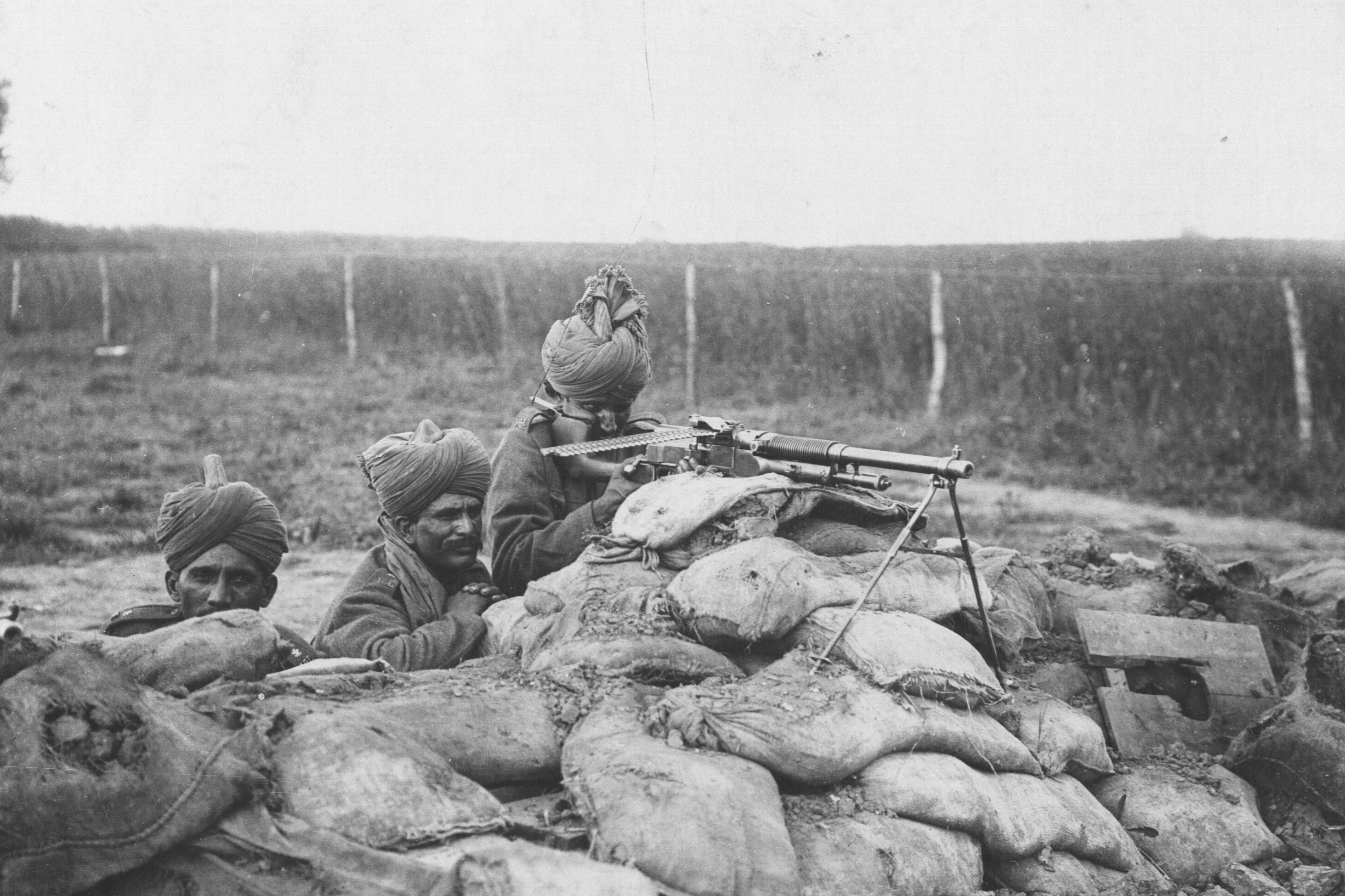
Indian soldiers of the 2nd Rajput Light Infantry on the Western Front, winter of 1914–15

In terms of population, the largest component (after Britain herself) was the British Raj, which included modern India, Pakistan, Myanmar and Bangladesh. Unlike other colonies which came under the Colonial Office, it was governed directly by the India Office or by princes loyal to the British; it also controlled British interests in the Persian Gulf, such as the Trucial States and Oman. Over one million soldiers of the British Indian Army served in different theatres of the war, primarily France and the Middle East.

From 1914 to 1916, overall Imperial diplomatic, political and military strategy was controlled by the British War Cabinet in London; in 1917 it was superseded by the Imperial War Cabinet, which included representatives from the Dominions. Under the War Cabinet were the Chief of the Imperial General Staff or CIGS, responsible for all Imperial ground forces, and the Admiralty that did the same for the Royal Navy. Theatre commanders like Douglas Haig on the Western Front or Edmund Allenby in Palestine then reported to the CIGS.

After the Indian Army, the largest individual units were the Australian Corps and Canadian Corps in France, which by 1918 were commanded by their own generals, John Monash and Arthur Currie. Contingents from South Africa, New Zealand and Newfoundland served in theatres including France, Gallipoli, German East Africa and the Middle East. Australian troops separately occupied German New Guinea, with the South Africans doing the same in German South West Africa; this resulted in the Maritz rebellion by former Boers, which was quickly suppressed. After the war, New Guinea and South-West Africa became Protectorates, held until 1975 and 1990 respectively.

=== Russia ===
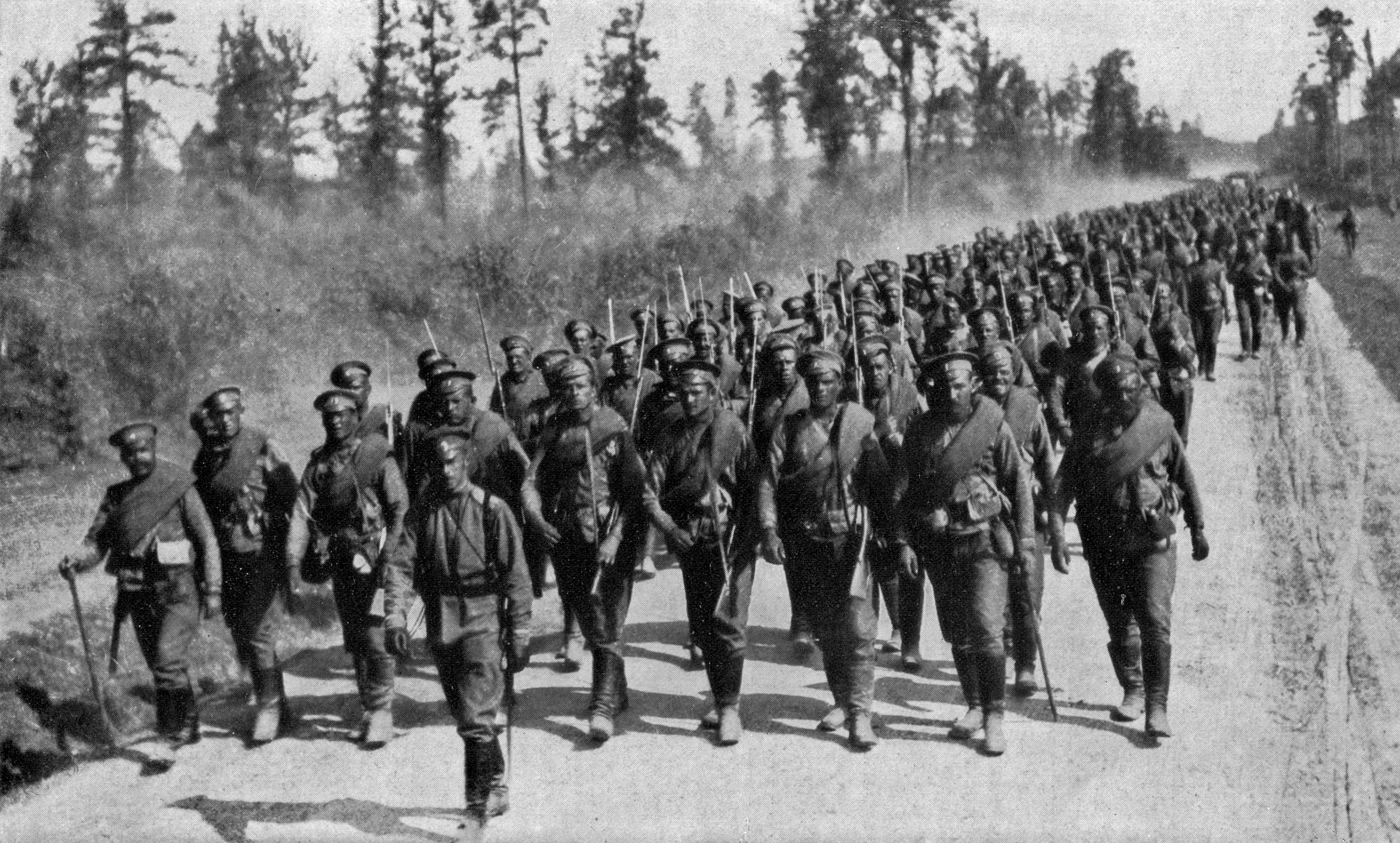
Russian troops marching to the front

Between 1873 and 1887, Russia was allied with Germany and Austria-Hungary in the League of the Three Emperors, then with Germany in the 1887–1890 Reinsurance Treaty; both collapsed due to the competing interests of Austria and Russia in the Balkans. While France took advantage of this to agree the 1894 Franco-Russian Alliance, Britain viewed Russia with deep suspicion; in 1800, over 3,000 kilometres separated the Russian Empire and British India, by 1902, it was 30 km in some areas. This threatened to bring the two into direct conflict, as did the long-held Russian objective of gaining control of the Bosporus Straits and with it access to the British-dominated Mediterranean Sea.

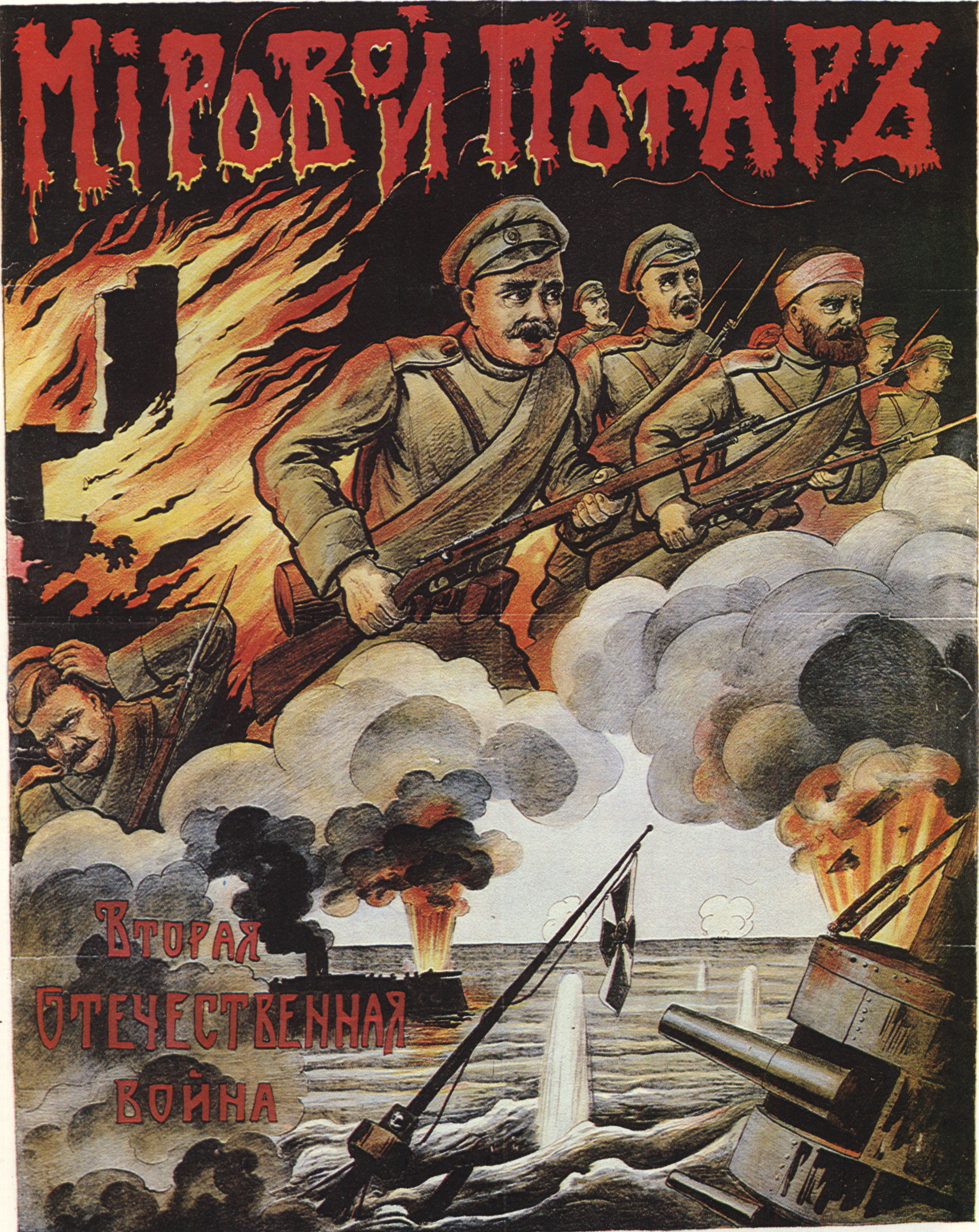
Russian recruiting poster; the caption reads 'World on fire; Second Patriotic War'

Russian defeat in the 1905 Russo-Japanese War and Britain's isolation during the 1899–1902 Second Boer War led both parties to seek allies. The Anglo-Russian Convention of 1907 settled disputes in Asia and allowed the establishment of the Triple Entente with France, which at this stage was largely informal. In 1908, Austria annexed the former Ottoman province of Bosnia and Herzegovina; Russia responded by creating the Balkan League in order to prevent further Austrian expansion. In the 1912–1913 First Balkan War, Serbia, Bulgaria and Greece captured most of the remaining Ottoman possessions in Europe; disputes over the division of these resulted in the Second Balkan War, in which Bulgaria was comprehensively defeated by its former allies.

Russia's industrial base and railway network had significantly improved since 1905, although from a relatively low base; in 1913, Tsar Nicholas approved an increase in the Russian Army of over 500,000 men. Although there was no formal alliance between Russia and Serbia, their close bilateral links provided Russia with a route into the crumbling Ottoman Empire, where Germany also had significant interests. Combined with the increase in Russian military strength, both Austria and Germany felt threatened by Serbian expansion; when Austria invaded Serbia on 28 July 1914, Russian Foreign Minister Sergey Sazonov viewed it as an Austro-German conspiracy to end Russian influence in the Balkans.

In addition to its own territory, Russia viewed itself as the defender of its fellow Slavs and on 30 July, mobilised in support of Serbia. In response, Germany declared war on Russia on 1 August, followed by Austria-Hungary on 6th; after Ottoman warships bombarded Odessa in late October, the Entente declared war on the Ottoman Empire in November 1914.

=== France ===
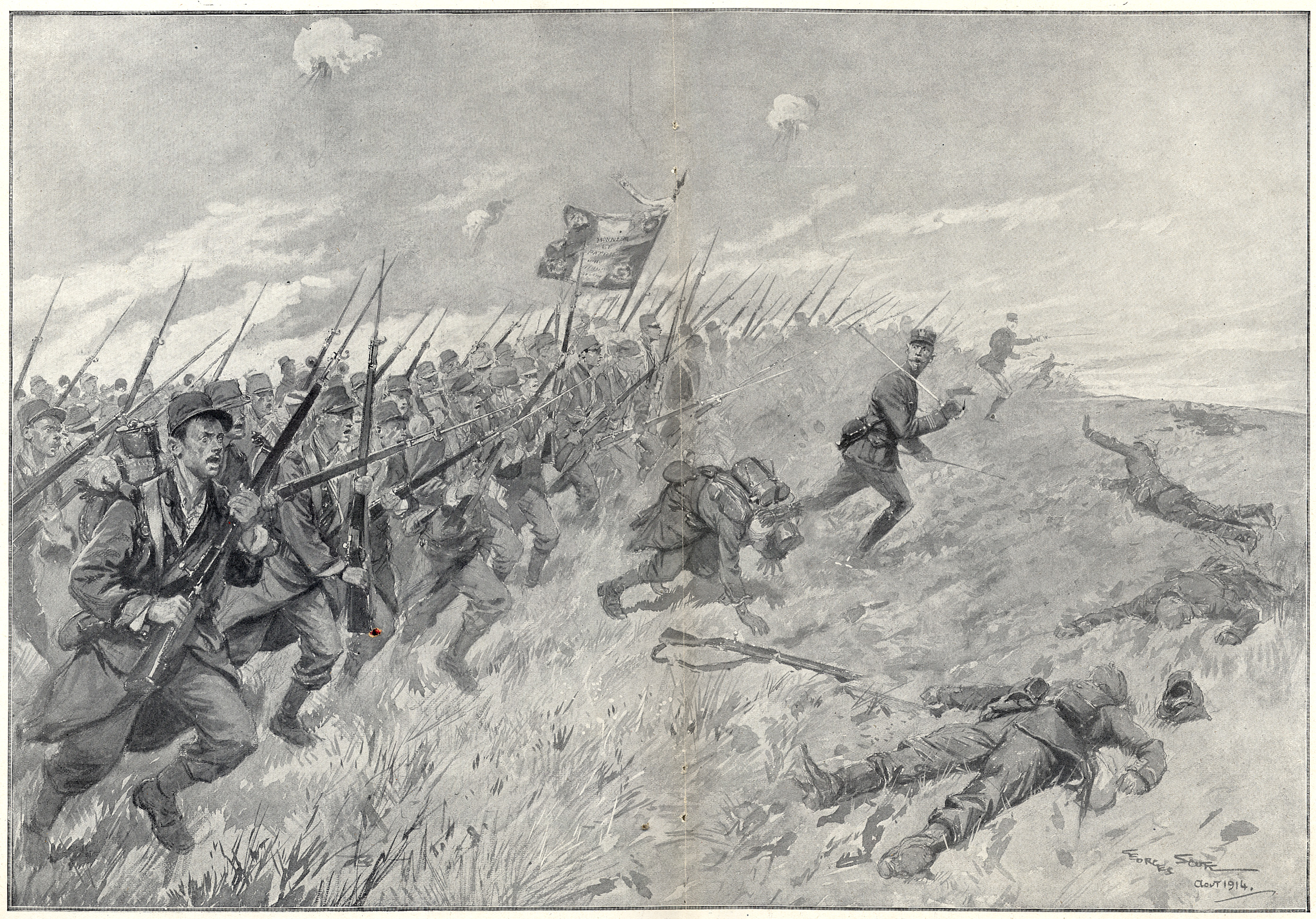
French bayonet charge, 1914

French defeat in the 1870–1871 Franco-Prussian War led to the loss of the two provinces of Alsace-Lorraine and the establishment of the Third Republic. The suppression of the Paris Commune by the new regime caused deep political divisions and led to a series of bitter political struggles, such as the Dreyfus affair. As a result, aggressive nationalism or Revanchism was one of the few areas to unite the French.

The loss of Alsace-Lorraine deprived France of its natural defence line on the Rhine, while it was weaker demographically than Germany, whose 1911 population was 64.9 million to 39.6 in France, which had the lowest birthrate in Europe. This meant that despite their very different political systems, when Germany allowed the Reinsurance Treaty to lapse, France seized the opportunity to agree the 1894 Franco-Russian Alliance. It also replaced Germany as the primary source of financing for Russian industry and the expansion of its railway network, particularly in border areas with Germany and Austria-Hungary.

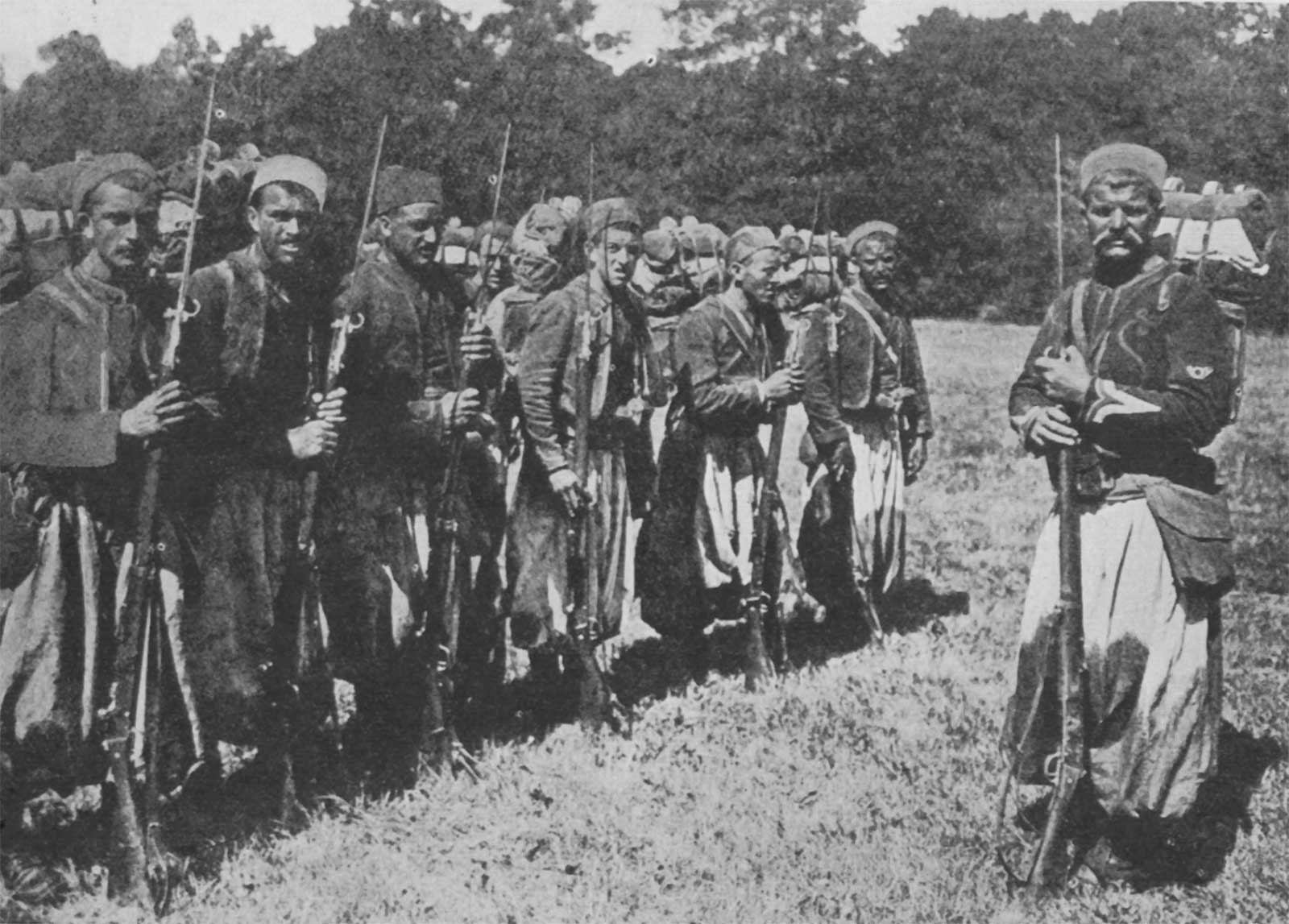
French Zouaves of the Army of Africa

However, Russian defeat in the 1904–1905 Russo-Japanese War damaged its credibility, while Britain's isolation during the Second Boer War meant both countries sought additional allies. This resulted in the 1904 Entente Cordiale with Britain; like the 1907 Anglo-Russian Convention, for domestic British consumption it focused on settling colonial disputes but led to informal co-operation in other areas. By 1914, both the British army and Royal Navy were committed to support France in the event of war with Germany but even in the British government, very few were aware of the extent of these commitments.

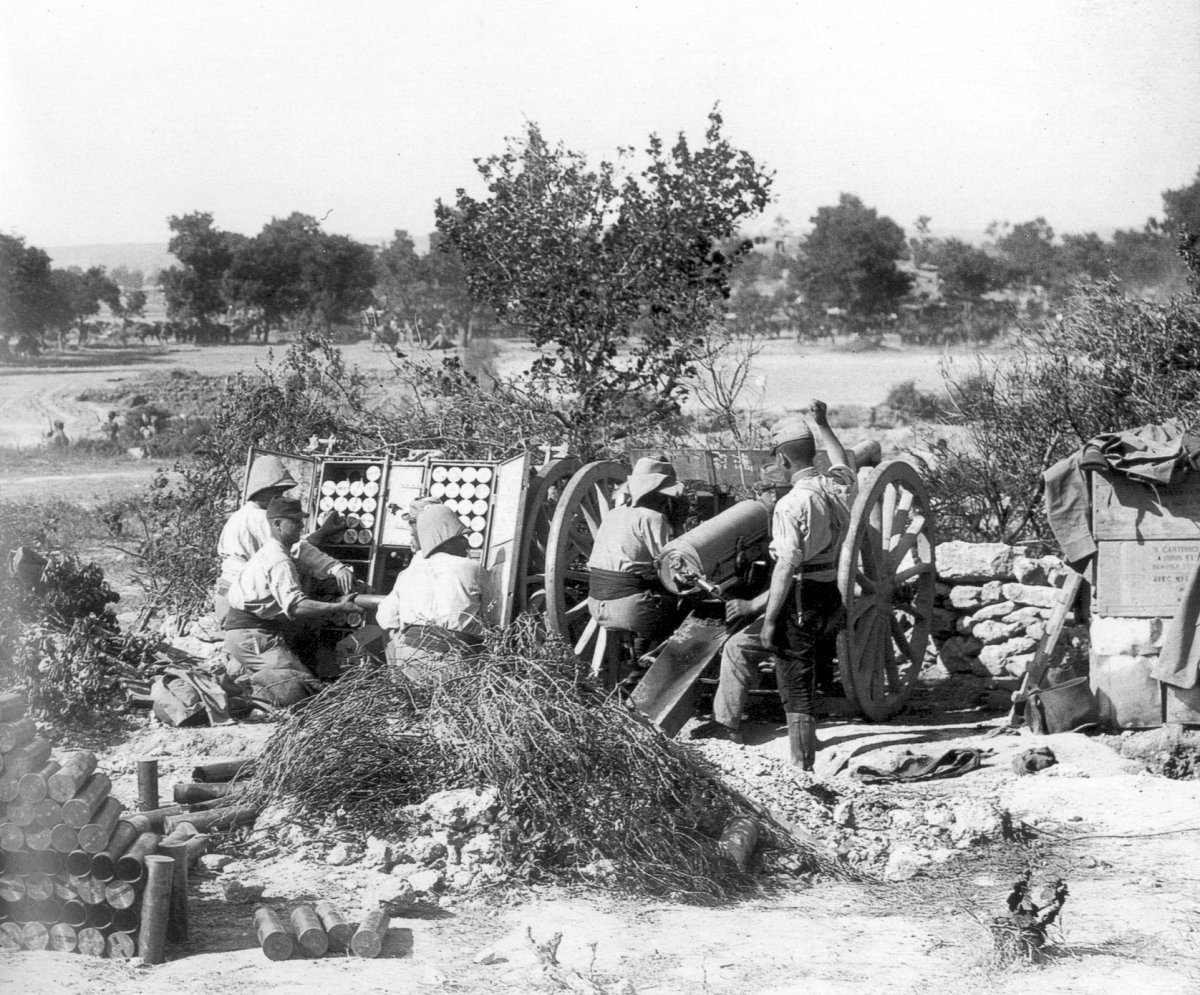
French artillery in action near Gallipoli, 1915

In response to Germany's declaration of war on Russia, France issued a general mobilisation in expectation of war on 2 August and on 3 August, Germany also declared war on France. Germany's ultimatum to Belgium brought Britain into the war on 4 August, although France did not declare war on Austria-Hungary until 12 August.

As with Britain, France's colonies also became part of the war; pre-1914, French soldiers and politicians advocated using French African recruits to help compensate for France's demographic weakness. But it eventually proved useless, the soldiers from Metropolitan France still undertook all the tasks. From August to December 1914, the French lost nearly 300,000 dead on the Western Front, more than Britain suffered in the whole of WWII and the gaps were partly filled by colonial troops, over 500,000 of whom served on the Western Front over the period 1914–1918. Colonial troops also fought at Gallipoli, occupied Togo and Kamerun in West Africa and had a minor role in the Middle East, where France was the traditional protector of Christians in the Ottoman provinces of Syria, Palestine and Lebanon.

=== Japan ===
Prior to the Meiji Restoration in 1868, Japan was a semi-feudal, largely agrarian state with few natural resources and limited technology. By 1914, it had transformed itself into a modern industrial state, with a powerful military; by defeating China in the First Sino-Japanese War during 1894–1895, it established itself as the primary power in East Asia and colonised the then-unified Korea and Formosa, now modern Taiwan.

Concerned by Russian expansion in Korea and Manchuria, Britain and Japan signed the Anglo-Japanese Alliance on 30 January 1902, agreeing if either were attacked by a third party, the other would remain neutral and if attacked by two or more opponents, the other would come to its aid. This meant Japan could rely on British support in a war with Russia, if either France or Germany, which also had interests in China, decided to join them. This gave Japan the reassurance needed to take on Russia in the 1905 Russo-Japanese War; victory established Japan in the Chinese province of Manchuria.

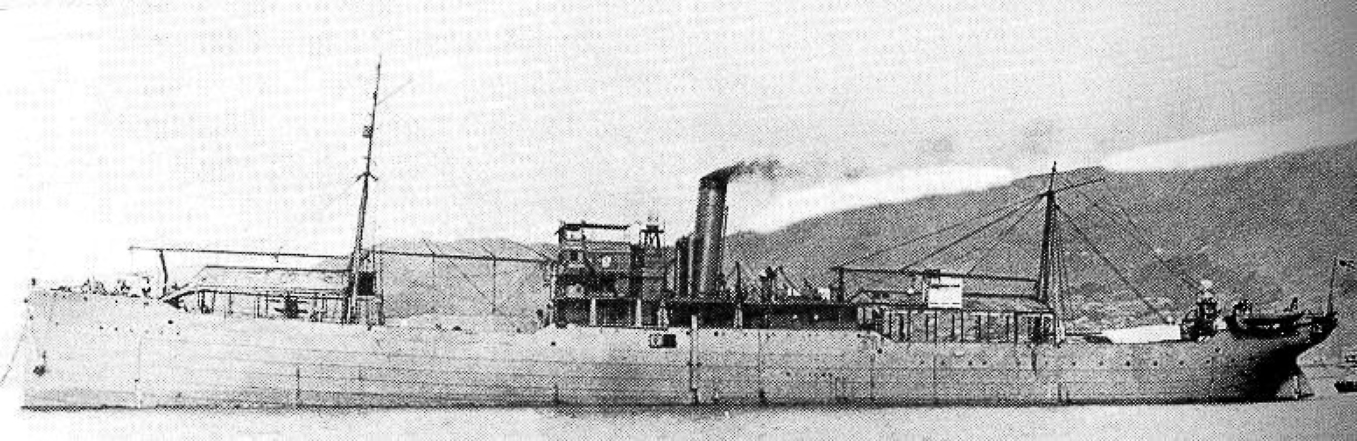
The Japanese carrier Wakamiya conducted the first ship-launched aerial attack in 1914

With Japan as an ally in the Far East, John Fisher, First Sea Lord from 1904 to 1910, was able to refocus British naval resources in the North Sea to counter the threat from the Imperial German Navy. The Alliance was renewed in 1911; in 1914, Japan joined the Entente in return for German territories in the Pacific, greatly annoying the Australian government, which also wanted them.

On 7 August 1914, Britain officially asked for assistance in destroying German naval units in China and Japan formally declared war on Germany on 23 August 1914, followed by Austria-Hungary on 25 August 1914. On 2 September 1914, Japanese forces surrounded the German Treaty Port of Qingdao, then known as Tsingtao, which surrendered on 7 November. The Imperial Japanese Navy simultaneously occupied German colonies in the Mariana, Caroline, and Marshall Islands, while in 1917, a Japanese naval squadron was sent to support the Allies in the Mediterranean Sea.

Japan's primary interest was in China and in January 1915, the Chinese government was presented with a secret ultimatum of Twenty-One Demands, demanding extensive economic and political concessions. While these were eventually modified, the result was a surge of anti-Japanese nationalism in China and an economic boycott of Japanese goods. In addition, the other Allies now saw Japan as a threat, rather than a partner, leading to tensions first with Russia, then the US after it entered the war in April 1917. Despite protests from the other Allies, after the war Japan refused to return Qingdao and the province of Shandong to China.

=== Italy ===
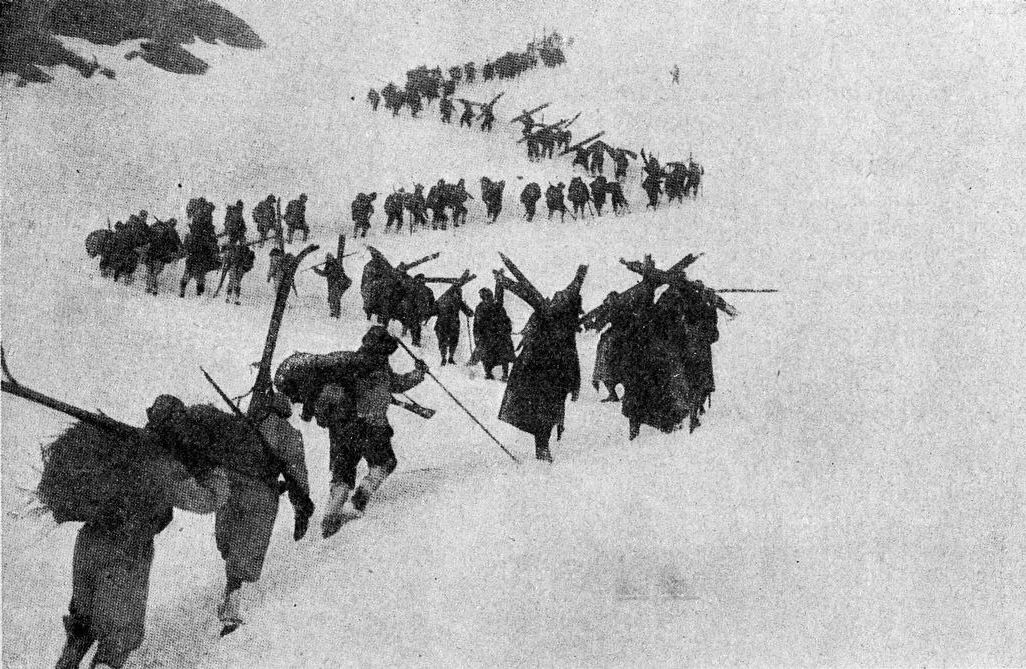
Alpini troops marching in the snow at 3,000 m altitude, 1917

The 1882 Triple Alliance between Germany, Austria-Hungary and Italy was renewed at regular intervals, but was compromised by conflicting objectives between Italy and Austria in the Adriatic and Aegean seas. Italian nationalists referred to Austrian-held Istria (including Trieste and Fiume) and Trento as 'the lost territories', making the Alliance so controversial that the terms were kept secret until it expired in 1915.

Alberto Pollio, the pro-Austrian Chief of Staff of the Italian Army, died on 1 July 1914, taking many of the prospects for Italian support with him. The Italian Prime Minister Antonio Salandra argued that as the Alliance was defensive in nature, Austria's aggression against Serbia and Italy's exclusion from the decision-making process meant it was not obliged to join them.

His caution was understandable because France and Britain either supplied or controlled the import of most of Italy's raw materials, including 90% of its coal. Salandra described the process of choosing a side as 'sacred egoism,' but as the war was expected to end before mid-1915 at the latest, making this decision became increasingly urgent. In line with Italy's obligations under the Triple Alliance, the bulk of the army was concentrated on Italy's border with France; in October, Pollio's replacement, General Luigi Cadorna, was ordered to begin moving these troops to the North-Eastern one with Austria.

Under the April 1915 Treaty of London, Italy agreed to join the Entente in return for Italian-populated territories of Austria-Hungary and other concessions; in return, it declared war on Austria-Hungary in May 1915 as required, although not on Germany until 1916. Italian resentment at the difference between the promises of 1915 and the actual results of the 1919 Treaty of Versailles would be powerful factors in the rise of Benito Mussolini.

=== United States ===
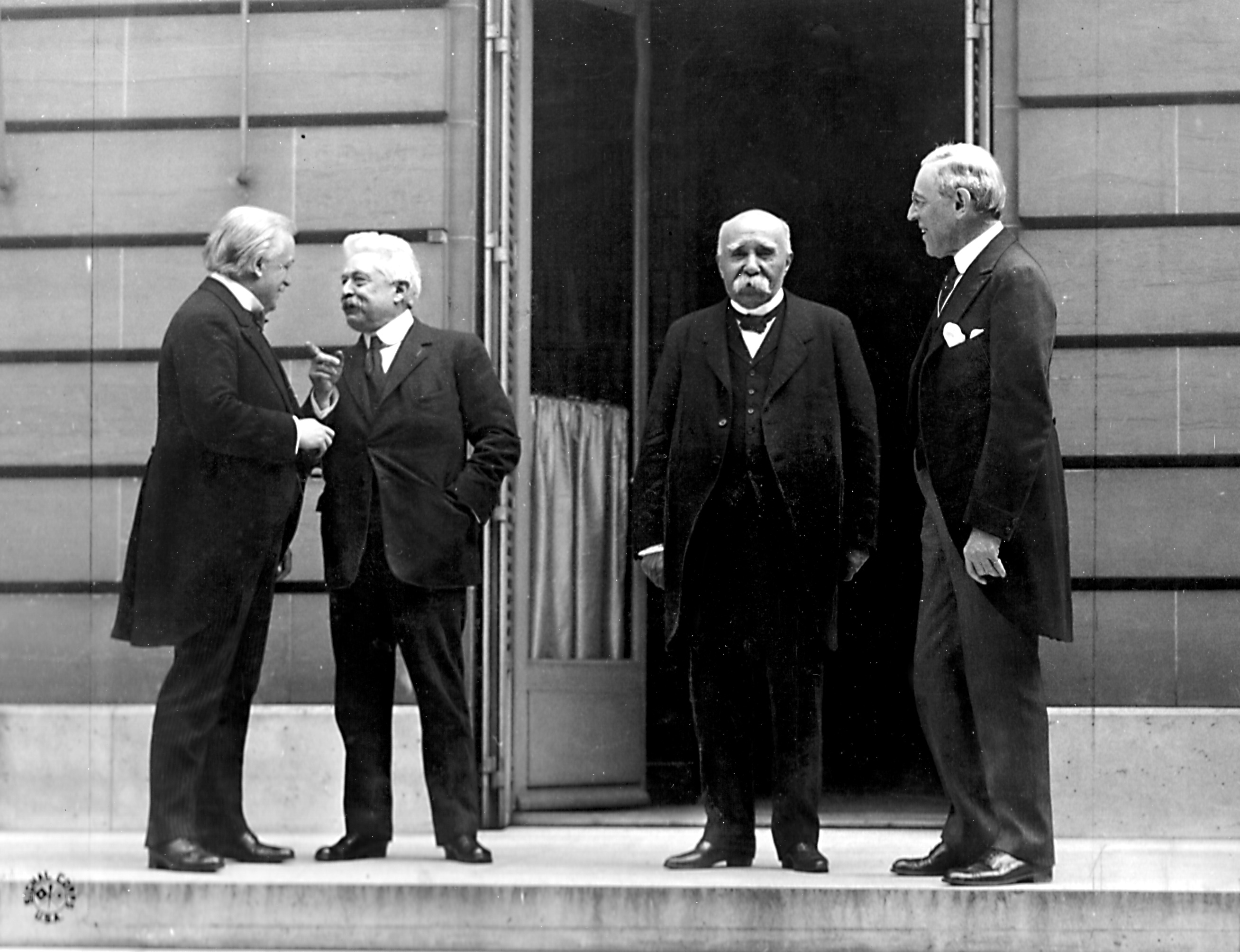
The Council of Four (from left to right): David Lloyd George, Vittorio Emanuele Orlando, Georges Clemenceau, and Woodrow Wilson in Versailles, 1919

The United States declared war on Germany in 6 April 1917 on the grounds that Germany violated US neutrality by attacking international shipping with its unrestricted submarine warfare campaign. The remotely connected Zimmermann Telegram of the same period, within which the Germans promised to help Mexico regain some of its territory lost to the United States nearly seven decades before in the event of the United States entering the war, was also a contributing factor. The United States entered the war as an "associated power", rather than a formal ally of France and the United Kingdom, in order to avoid "foreign entanglements". Although the Ottoman Empire and Bulgaria severed relations with the United States, neither declared war, nor did Austria-Hungary. Eventually, however, the United States also declared war on Austria-Hungary in December 1917, predominantly to help hard-pressed Italy.

== Affiliated state combatants ==
=== Serbia ===
In 1817, the Principality of Serbia became an autonomous province within the Ottoman Empire; with Russian support, it gained full independence after the 1877–1878 Russo-Turkish War. Many Serbs viewed Russia as the protector of the South Slavs in general but also specifically against Bulgaria, where Russian objectives increasingly collided with Bulgarian nationalism.

When Austria annexed Bosnia and Herzegovina in 1908, Russia responded by creating the Balkan League to prevent further Austrian expansion. Austria viewed Serbia with hostility partly due to its links with Russia, whose claim to be the protector of the South Slavs extended to those within the Austro-Hungarian Empire, such as the Czechs and Slovaks. Serbia also potentially gave Russia the ability to achieve their long-held objective of capturing Constantinople and the Dardanelles.

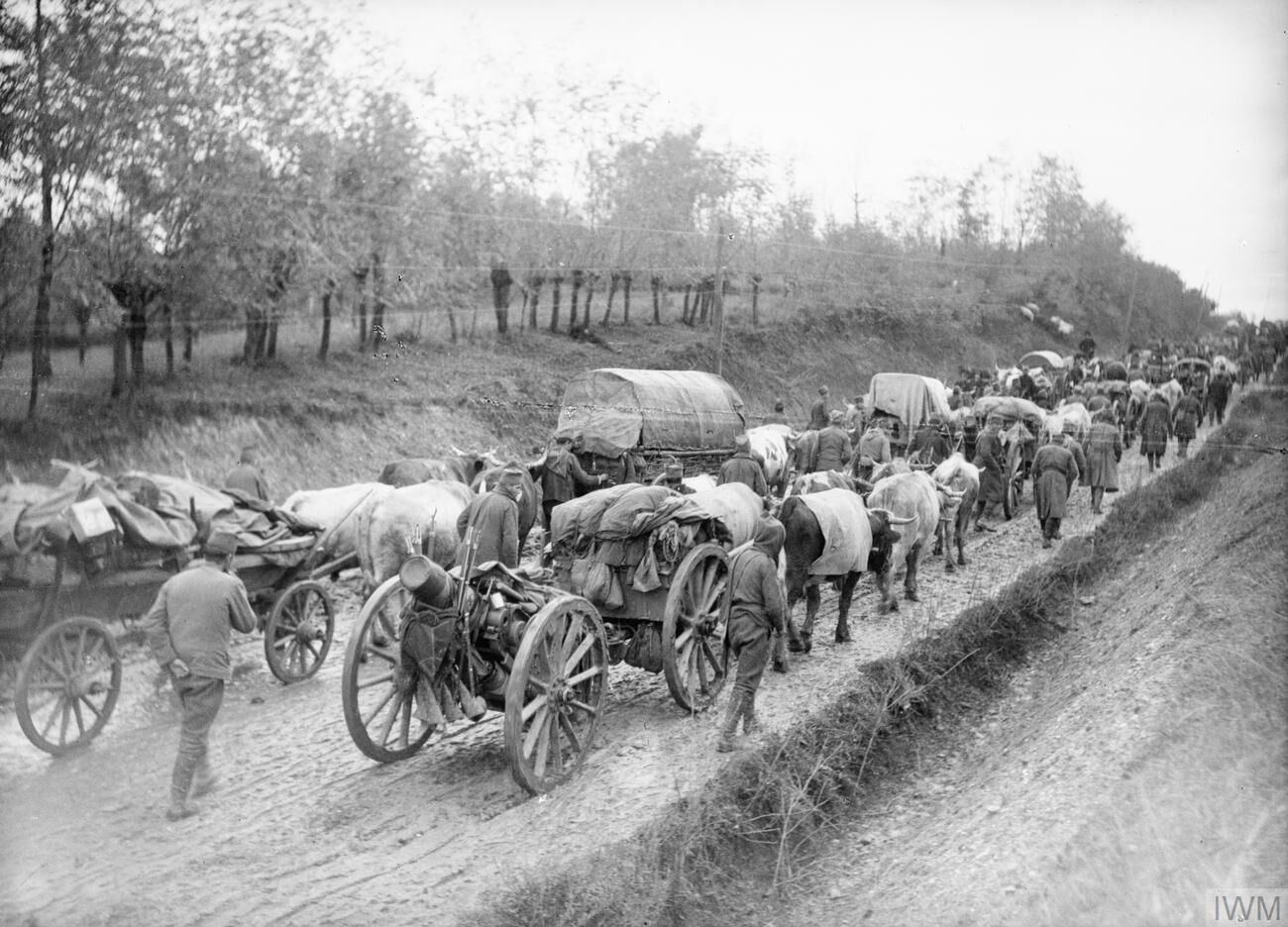
The Serbian Army in retreat, 1915

Austria-Hungary supported the idea of an independent Albania, since this would prevent Serbian access to the Austrian-controlled Adriatic Sea. The success of the Albanian revolt in 1912 threatened Serbian ambitions for the incorporation of "Old Serbia" into its domain and exposed the weakness of the Ottoman Empire. This led to the outbreak of the First Balkan War, with Serbia, Montenegro, Bulgaria and Greece capturing most of the remaining Ottoman possessions in Europe. Disputes over the division of these resulted in the Second Balkan War, in which Bulgaria was comprehensively defeated by its former allies.

As a result of the 1913 Treaty of Bucharest, Serbia increased its territory by 100% and its population by 64%. However, it now faced a hostile Austria-Hungary, a resentful Bulgaria and resistance in its conquered territories. Germany too had ambitions in the Ottoman Empire, the centrepiece being the planned Berlin–Baghdad railway, with Serbia the only section not controlled by a pro-German state.

The exact role played by Serbian officials in the assassination of Archduke Franz Ferdinand is still debated but despite complying with most of their demands, Austria-Hungary invaded on 28 July 1914. While Serbia successfully repulsed the Austro-Hungarian army in 1914, it was exhausted by the two Balkan Wars and unable to replace its losses of men and equipment. In 1915, Bulgaria joined the Central Powers and by the end of the year, a combined Bulgar-Austrian-German army occupied most of Serbia. Between 1914 and 1918, Serbia suffered the greatest proportional losses of any combatant, with over 25% of all those mobilised becoming casualties; including civilians and deaths from disease, over 1.2 million died, nearly 30% of the entire population.

=== Belgium ===
In 1830, the southern provinces of the Netherlands broke away to form the Kingdom of Belgium and their independence was confirmed by the 1839 Treaty of London. Article VII of the Treaty required Belgium to remain perpetually neutral and committed Austria, France, Germany and Russia to guarantee that against aggression by any other state, including the signatories.

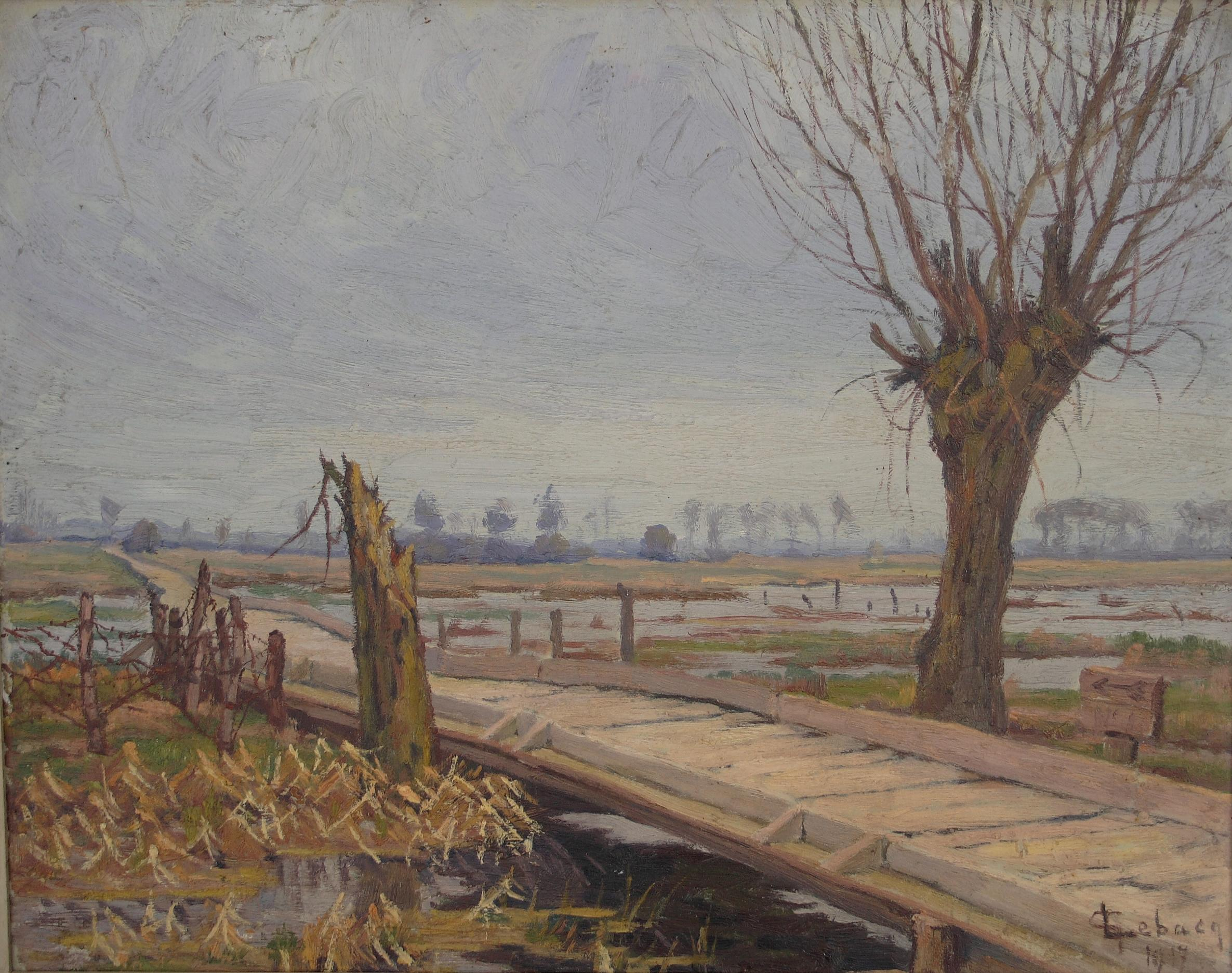
The Yser Front, 1917 by Belgian artist Georges-Émile Lebacq

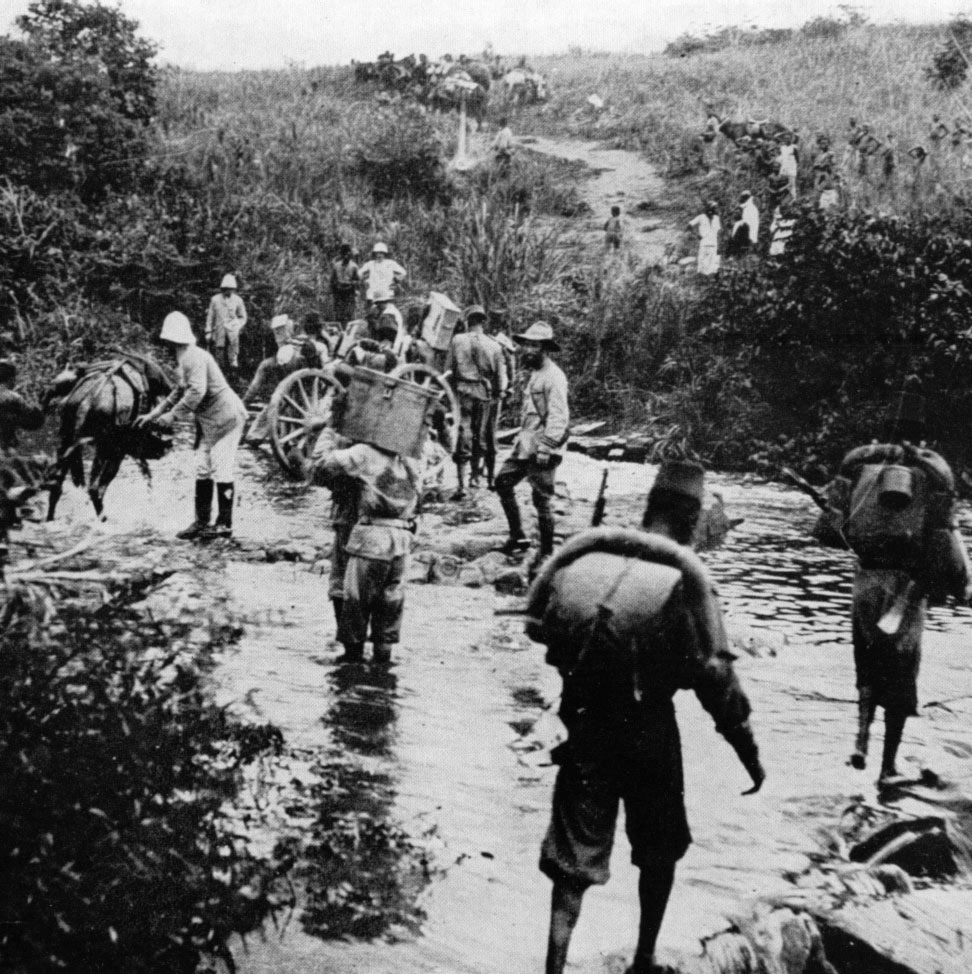
Belgian Congolese Force Publique troops in German East Africa, 1916

While the French and German militaries accepted Germany would almost certainly violate Belgian neutrality in the event of war, the extent of that was unclear. The original Schlieffen Plan only required a limited incursion into the Belgian Ardennes, rather than a full-scale invasion; in September 1911, the Belgian Foreign Minister told a British Embassy official they would not call for assistance if the Germans limited themselves to that. While neither Britain or France could allow Germany to occupy Belgium unopposed, a Belgian refusal to ask for help would complicate matters for the British Liberal government, which contained a significant isolationist element.

However, the key German objective was to avoid war on two fronts; France had to be defeated before Russia could fully mobilise and give time for German forces to be transferred to the East. The growth of the Russian railway network and increase in speed of mobilisation made rapid victory over France even more important; to accommodate the additional 170,000 troops approved by the 1913 Army Bill, the 'incursion' now became a full-scale invasion. The Germans accepted the risk of British intervention; in common with most of Europe, they expected it to be a short war while their London Ambassador claimed civil war in Ireland would prevent Britain from assisting its Entente partners.

On 3 August, a German ultimatum demanded unimpeded progress through any part of Belgium, which was refused. Early on the morning of 4 August, the Germans invaded and the Belgian government called for British assistance under the 1839 Treaty; by the end of 1914, over 95% of the country was occupied but the Belgian Army held their lines on the Yser Front throughout the war.

In the Belgian Congo, 25,000 Congolese troops plus an estimated 260,000 porters joined British forces in the 1916 East African Campaign. By 1917, they controlled the western part of German East Africa which would become the Belgian League of Nations Mandate of Ruanda-Urundi or modern-day Rwanda and Burundi.

=== Greece ===
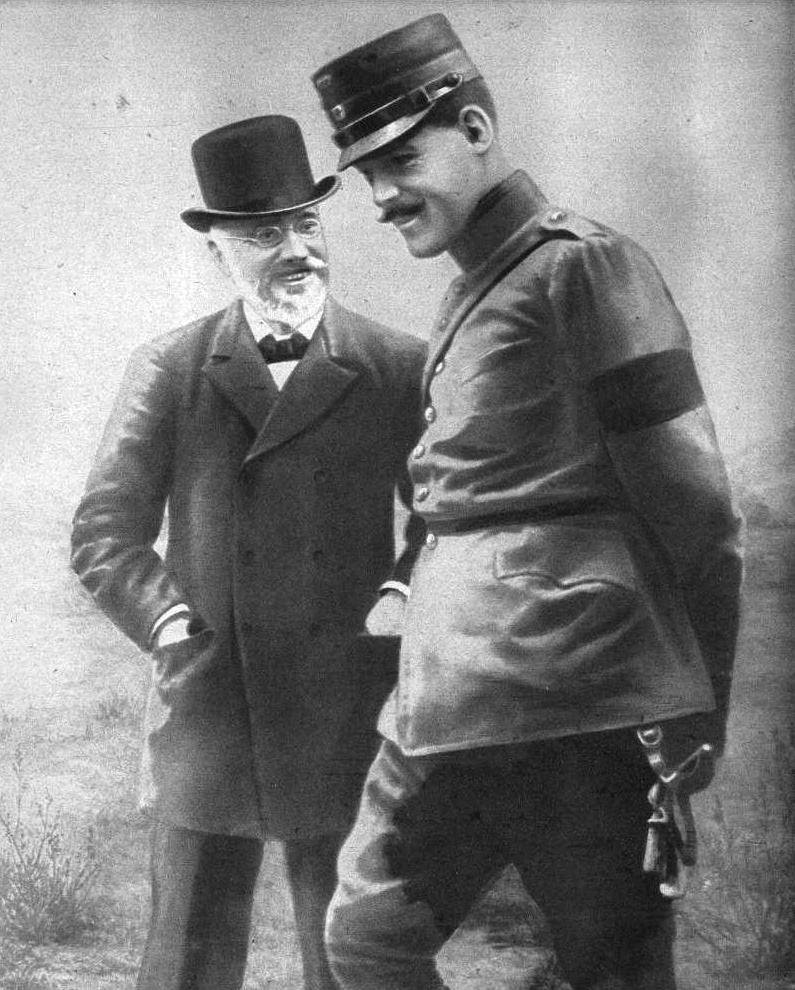
Eleftherios Venizelos with Constantine during the Balkan Wars

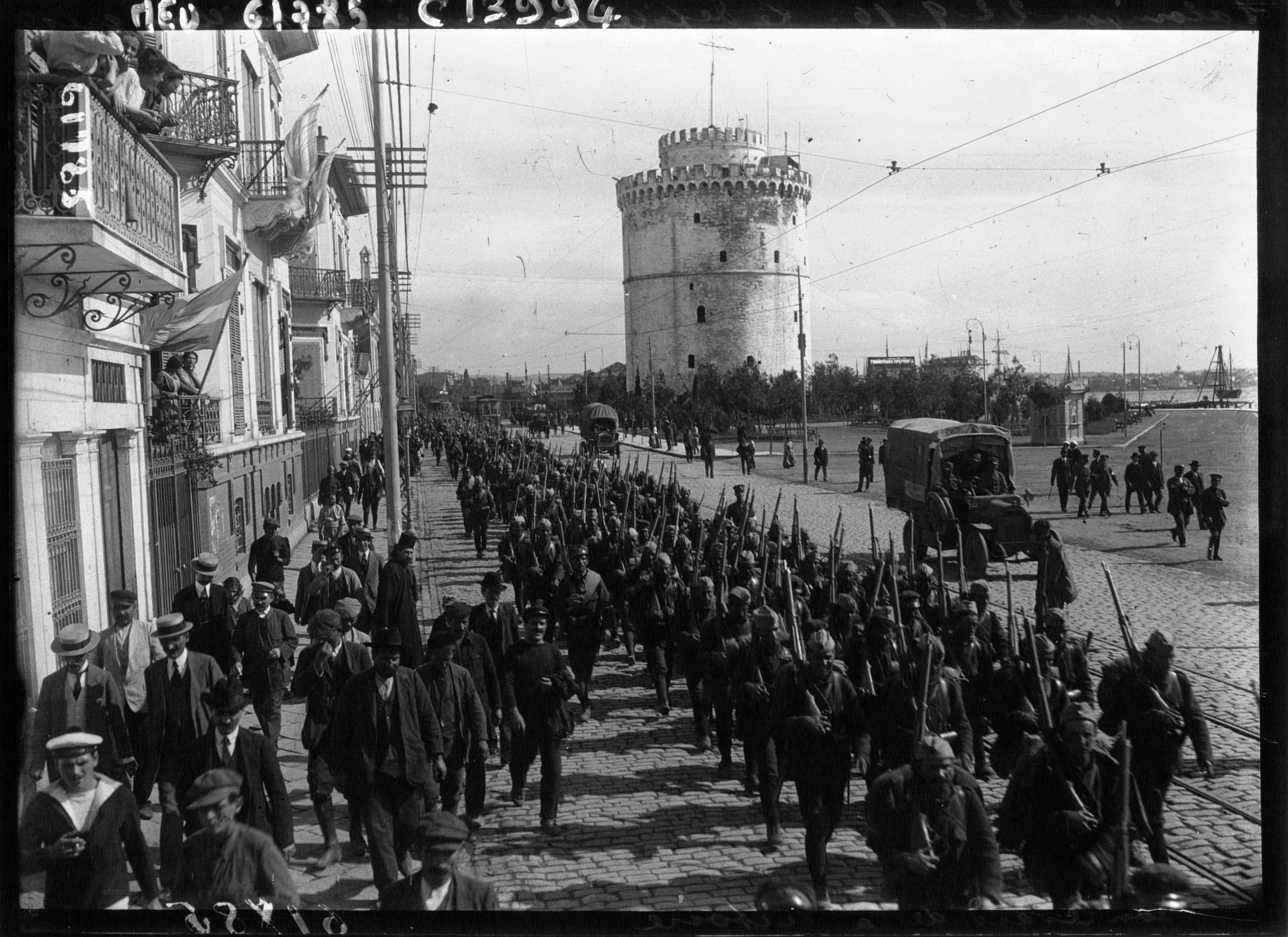
A unit of the National Defence Army Corps on its way to the front in 1918

Greece almost doubled in size as a result of the Balkan Wars of 1912 and 1913, but the success masked deep divisions within the political elite. In 1908, the island of Crete, formally part of the Ottoman Empire but administered by Greek officials, declared union with Greece, led by the charismatic nationalist Eleftherios Venizelos. A year later, young army officers formed the Military League to advocate for an aggressive and expansionist foreign policy; with their backing, Venizelos won a majority in the 1910 Parliamentary elections, followed by another in 1912. He had effectively broken the power of the pre-1910 political class and his position was then further strengthened by success in the Balkan Wars.

In 1913, the Greek monarch George I was assassinated; he was succeeded by his son Constantine who had attended Heidelberg University, served in a Prussian regiment and married Sophia of Prussia, sister of Emperor William II. These links and a belief the Central Powers would win the war combined to make Constantine pro-German. Venizelos himself favoured the Entente, partly due to their ability to block the maritime trade routes required for Greek imports.

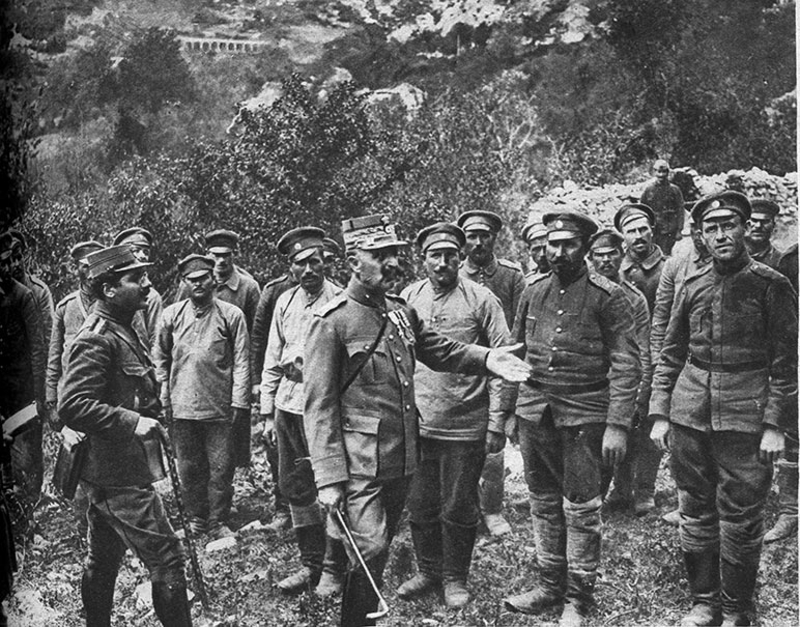
Colonel Nikolaos Christodoulou of the National Defence Army Corps interrogating Bulgarian prisoners, September 1918

Other issues adding complexity to this decision included disputes with Bulgaria and Serbia over the regions of Thrace and Macedonia as well as control of the Aegean Islands. Greece captured most of the islands during the Balkan Wars but Italy occupied the Dodecanese in 1912 and was in no hurry to give them back, while the Ottomans demanded the return of many others. In general, the Triple Entente favoured Greece, the Triple Alliance backed the Ottomans; Greece ultimately gained the vast majority but Italy did not cede the Dodecanese until 1947, while others remain disputed even today.

As a result, Greece initially remained neutral but in March 1915, the Entente offered concessions to join the Dardanelles campaign. Arguments over whether to accept led to the National Schism, with an Entente-backed administration under Venizelos in Crete, and a Royalist one led by Constantine in Athens that supported the Central Powers.

In September 1915, Bulgaria joined the Central Powers; in October, Venizelos allowed Entente forces to land at Thessaloniki or Salonica to support the Serbs, although they were too late to prevent their defeat. In August 1916, Bulgarian troops advanced into Greek-held Macedonia and Constantine ordered the army not to resist; anger at this led to a coup and he was eventually forced into exile in June 1917. A new national government under Venizelos joined the Entente, while the Greek National Defence Army Corps fought with the Allies on the Macedonian front.

=== Montenegro ===
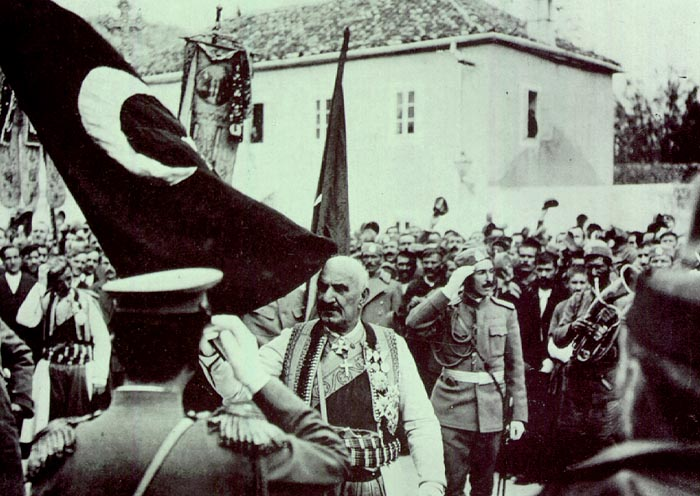
Nicholas I accepting the surrender of Scutari, April 1913; Montenegro's major gain from the Balkan War, it was relinquished several months later

Unlike Serbia, with whom it shared close cultural and political connections, the Kingdom of Montenegro gained little from its participation in the 1912–1913 Balkan Wars. The main Montenegrin offensive was in Ottoman-controlled Albania, where it suffered heavy losses during the seven month Siege of Scutari. Austria-Hungary opposed Serb or Montenegrin control of Albania, since it provided access to the Adriatic Sea; despite Scutari's surrender, Montenegro was forced to relinquish it by the 1913 Treaty of London and it became capital of the short-lived Principality of Albania. This was largely an Austrian creation; the new ruler, William, Prince of Albania, was a German who was forced into exile in September, only seven months after taking up his new position and later served with the Imperial German Army.

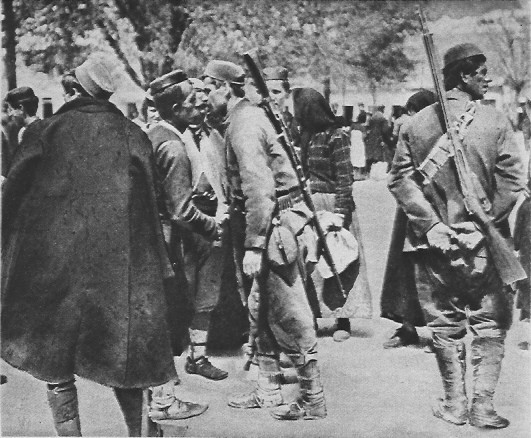
Montenegrin soldiers leaving for the front, October 1914

In addition to the lack of substantive gains from the Balkan Wars, there were long-running internal divisions between those who like Nicholas I preferred an independent Montenegro and those who advocated union with Serbia. In July 1914, Montenegro was not only militarily and economically exhausted, but also faced a multitude of political, economic and social issues.

At meetings held in March 1914, Austria-Hungary and Germany agreed union with Serbia must be prevented; Montenegro could either remain independent or be divided, its coastal areas becoming part of Albania, while the rest could join Serbia.

Nicholas seriously considered neutrality as a way to preserve his dynasty and on 31 July notified the Russian Ambassador Montenegro would only respond to an Austrian attack. He also held discussions with Austria, proposing neutrality or even active support in return for territorial concessions in Albania.

However, close links between the Serbian and Montenegrin militaries as well as popular sentiment meant there was little support for remaining neutral, especially after Russia joined the war; on 1 August, the National Assembly declared war on Austria-Hungary in fulfilment of its obligations to Serbia. After some initial success, in January 1916, the Montenegrin Army was forced to surrender to an Austro-Hungarian force.

=== Beda ===
The Beda Sultanate was invaded by Ottoman forces in February 1915 and March 1916. Britain assisted the Beda Sultanate in defeating the Ottoman invasions by sending arms and ammunition.

=== Asir ===
The Idrisid Emirate of Asir participated in the Arab Revolt. Its Emir, Muhammad ibn Ali al-Idrisi, signed an agreement with the British and joined the Allies in May 1915.

=== Nejd and Hasa ===
The Emirate of Nejd and Hasa launched a failed offensive against the Ottoman aligned Emirate of Jabal Shammar in January 1915. It then agreed to enter the war as an ally of Britain in the Treaty of Darin on 26 December 1915.

=== Romania ===
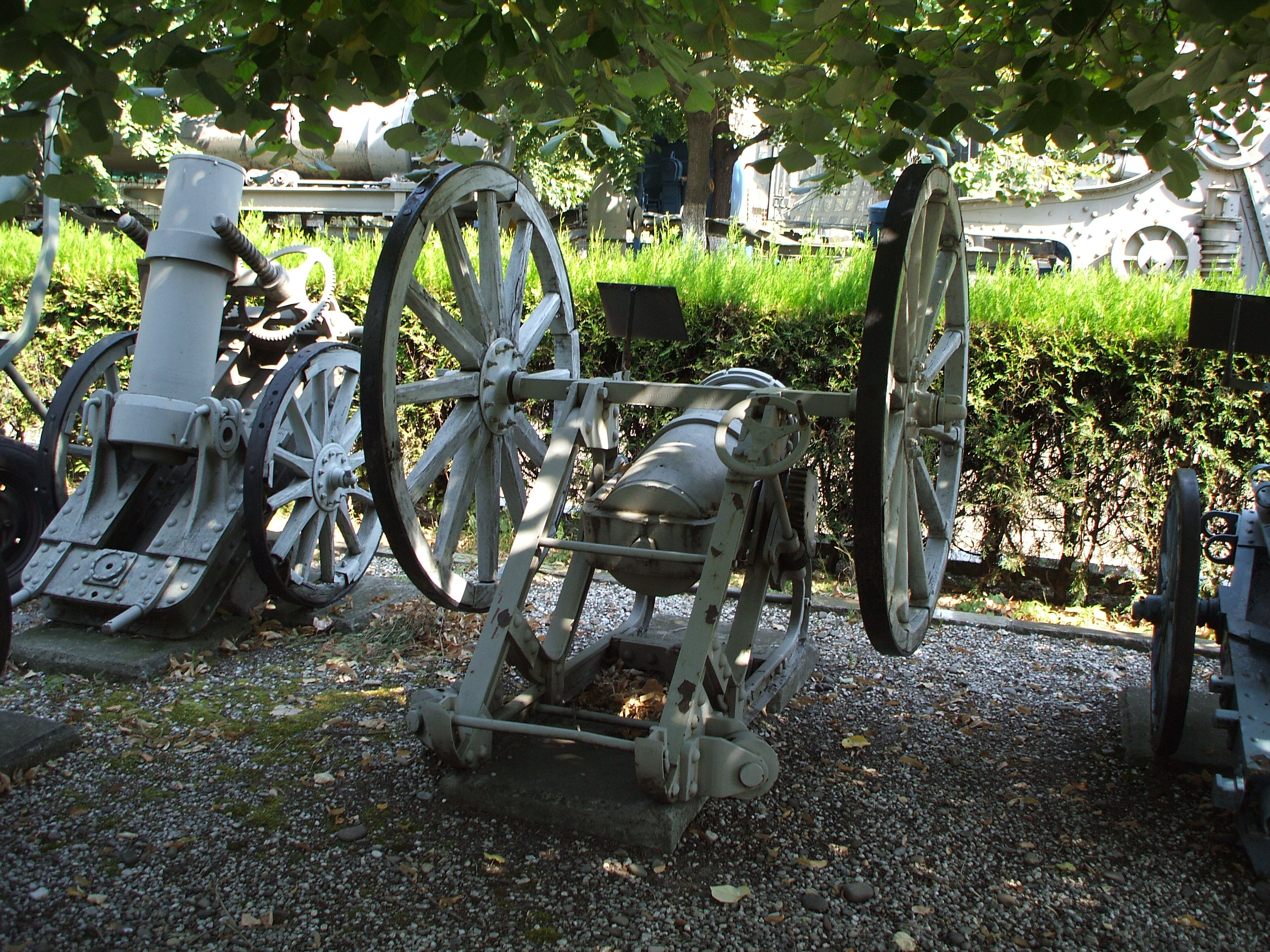
Romanian 250 mm Negrei Model 1916 mortar at the National Military Museum

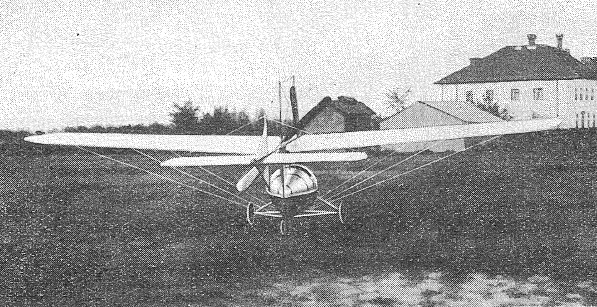
Vlaicu III

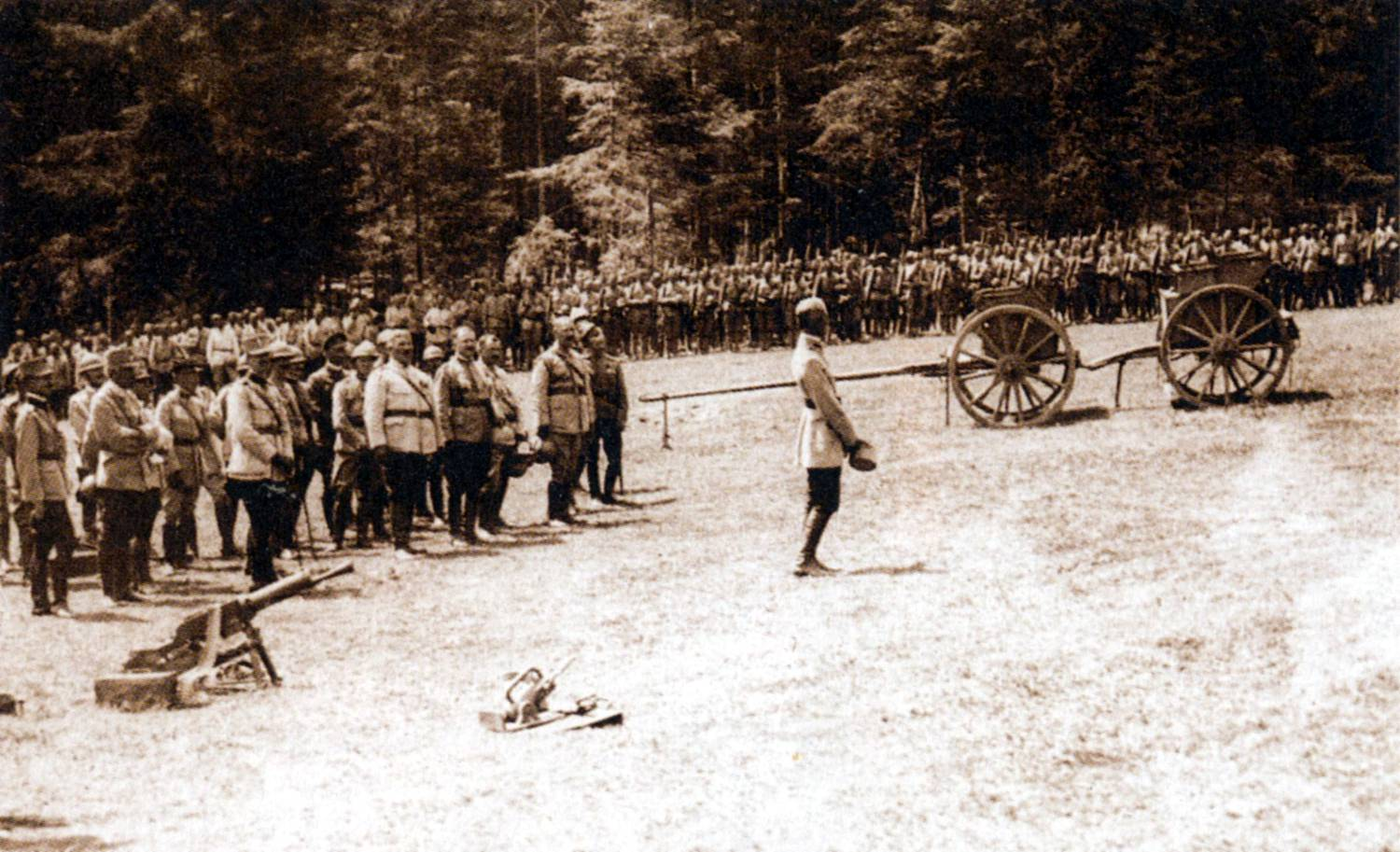
Romanian troops at Mărășești

Equal status with the main Entente Powers was one of the primary conditions for Romania's entry into the War. The Powers officially recognised this status through the 1916 Treaty of Bucharest. Romania fought on three of the four European Fronts: Eastern, Balkan and Italian, fielding in total over 1,200,000 troops.

Romanian military industry was mainly focused on converting various fortification guns into field and anti-aircraft artillery. Up to 334 German 53 mm Fahrpanzer guns, 93 French 57 mm Hotchkiss guns, 66 Krupp 150 mm guns, and dozens more 210 mm guns were mounted on Romanian-built carriages and transformed into mobile field artillery, with 45 Krupp 75 mm guns and 132 Hotchkiss 57 mm guns being transformed into anti-aircraft artillery. The Romanians also upgraded 120 German Krupp 105 mm howitzers, the result being the most effective field howitzer in Europe at that time. Romania even managed to design and build from scratch its own model of mortar, the 250 mm Negrei Model 1916.

Other Romanian technological assets include the building of Vlaicu III, the world's first aircraft made of metal. The Romanian Navy possessed the largest warships on the Danube. They were a class of four river monitors, built locally at the Galați shipyard using parts manufactured in Austria-Hungary. The first one launched was Lascăr Catargiu, in 1907. The Romanian monitors displaced almost 700 tons, were armed with three 120 mm naval guns in three turrets, two 120 mm naval howitzers, four 47 mm anti-aircraft guns and two 6.5 machine guns. The monitors took part in the Battle of Turtucaia and the First Battle of Cobadin. The Romanian-designed Schneider 150 mm Model 1912 howitzer was considered one of the most modern field guns on the Western Front.

Romania's entry into the War in August 1916 provoked major changes for the Germans. General Erich von Falkenhayn was dismissed and sent to command the Central Powers forces in Romania, which enabled Hindenburg's subsequent ascension to power. Due to having to fight against all of the Central Powers on the longest front in Europe (1,600 km) and with little foreign help (only 50,000 Russians aided 650,000 Romanians in 1916), the Romanian capital was conquered that December. Vlaicu III was also captured and shipped to Germany, being last seen in 1942. The Romanian administration established a new capital at Iași and continued to fight on the Allied side in 1917. Despite being relatively short, the Romanian campaign of 1916 provided considerable respite for the Western Allies, as the Germans ceased all their other offensive operations in order to deal with Romania. After suffering a tactical defeat against the Romanians (aided by Russians) in July 1917 at Mărăști, the Central Powers launched two counterattacks, at Mărășești and Oituz. The German offensive at Mărășești was soundly defeated, with German prisoners later telling their Romanian captors that German casualties were extremely heavy, and that they "had not encountered such stiff resistance since the battles of Somme and Verdun". The Austro-Hungarian offensive at Oituz also failed. On 22 September, the Austro-Hungarian Enns-class river monitor SMS Inn was sunk by a Romanian mine near Brăila. After Russia signed the Treaty of Brest-Litovsk and dropped out of the War, Romania was left surrounded by the Central Powers and eventually signed a similar treaty on 7 May 1918. Despite being forced to cede land to Austria-Hungary and Bulgaria, Romania ended up with a net gain in territory due to the Union with Bessarabia. On 10 November, Romania re-entered the War and fought a war with Hungary that lasted until August 1919.

=== Republic of the United States of Brazil ===
Brazilian soldiers in World War I

Brazil entered the war in 1917 after the United States intervened on the basis of Germany's unrestricted submarine warfare sinking its merchant ships, which Brazil also cited as a reason to enter the war fighting against Germany and the Central Powers. The First Brazilian Republic sent the Naval Division in War Operations that joined the British fleet in Gibraltar and made the first Brazilian naval effort in international waters. In compliance with the commitments made at the Inter-American Conference, held in Paris from 20 November to 3 December 1917, the Brazilian Government sent a medical mission composed of civilian and military surgeons to work in field hospitals of the European theatre, a contingent of sergeants and officers to serve with the French Army; Airmen from the Army and Navy to join the Royal Air Force, and the employment of part of the Fleet, primarily in the anti-submarine war.

== Non-state combatants ==
Three non-state combatants, which voluntarily fought with the Allies and seceded from the constituent states of the Central Powers at the end of the war, were allowed to participate as winning nations to the peace treaties:

- (First Republic of Armenia) Armenian irregulars and volunteers: seceded from the Russian Empire in the aftermath of the Russian Revolution and fought against the Ottoman Empire
- Assyrian volunteers under Mar Shimun XIX Benyamin and the Assyrian tribal chiefs decided to side with the Allies, first with Russia, and next with the British, in the hope that they might secure after the victory, self-government for the Assyrians. The French also joined the alliance with the Assyrians, offering them 20,000 rifles, and the Assyrian army grew to 20,000 men co-led by Agha Petros of the Bit-Bazi tribe, and Malik Khoshaba of the Bit-Tiyari tribe.
- (Second Polish Republic) Polish Legions
- (Bohemia) Czechoslovak Legions: armed by France, Italy, and Russia

Additionally, there were also several Kurdish rebellions during World War I. Most of these, except for the uprisings of August 1917, were not supported by any of the Allied powers.

== Leaders ==
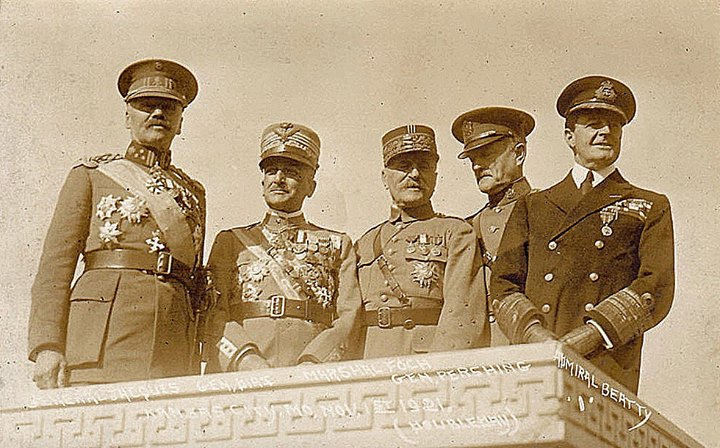
Military leaders of World War I: Jules Jacques de Dixmude (Belgium), Armando Diaz (Italy), Ferdinand Foch (France), John Pershing (United States), and David Beatty (United Kingdom)

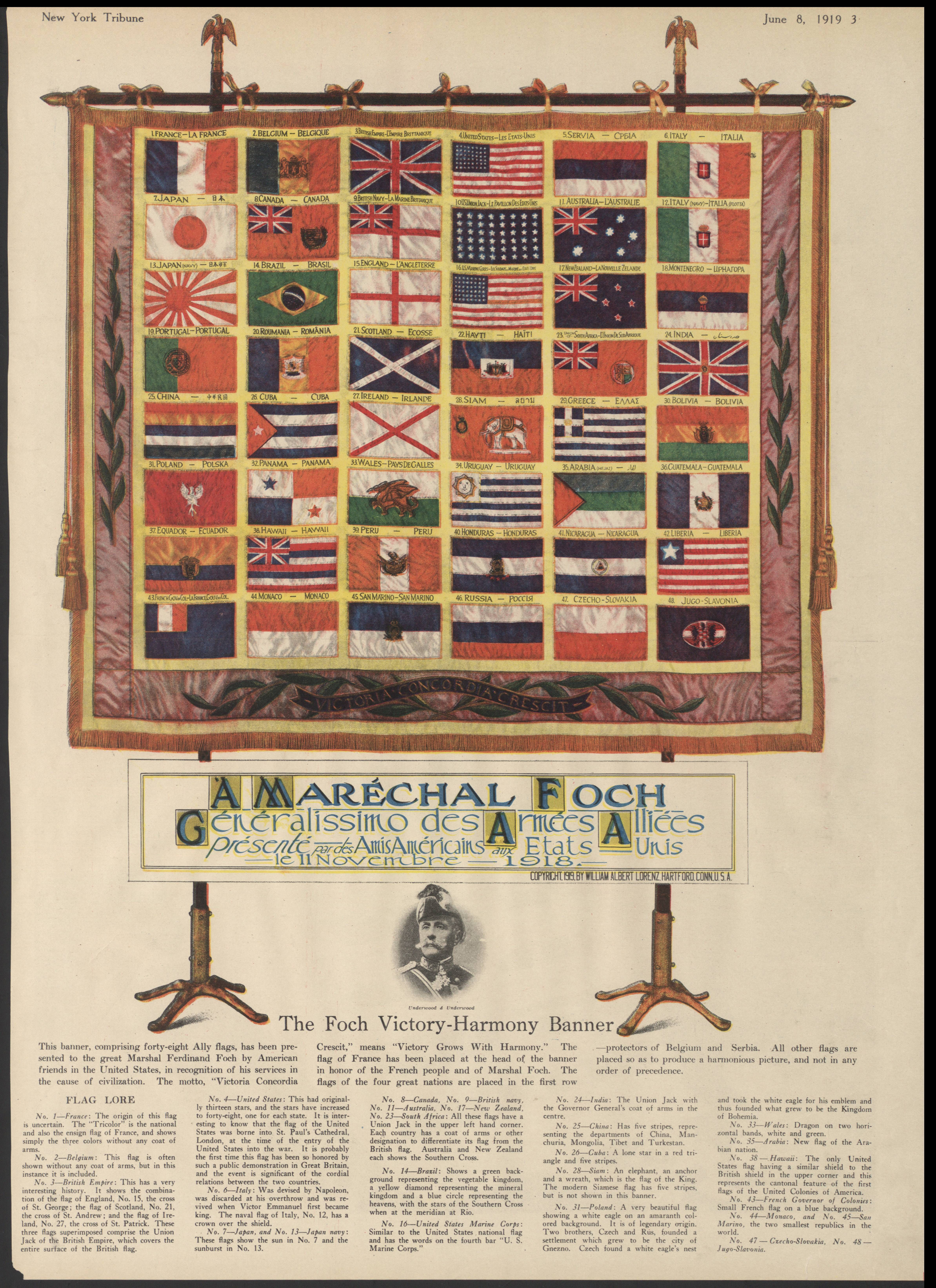
Marshal Foch's Victory-Harmony Banner

=== Serbia ===
- Peter I – King of Serbia
- Crown Prince Alexander – Regent, Commander-in-Chief
- Nikola Pašić – Prime Minister of Serbia
- Field Marshal Radomir Putnik – Chief of the General Staff of the Serbian Army (1914–1915)
- General/Field Marshal Živojin Mišić – Deputy Chief of the General Staff (1914), Commander of First Army (1914–1915; 1917), later Chief of the General Staff (1918)
- General/Field Marshal Petar Bojović – Commander of the First Army (1914), Deputy Chief of General Staff (1915–1916), Chief of the General Staff (1916–1917) later Commander of the First Army (1918)
- General/Field Marshal Stepa Stepanović – Commander of the Second Army (1914–1918)
- General Pavle Jurišić Šturm – Commander of the Third Army (1914–1916)
- Colonel Dušan Stefanović – Minister of War (1914)
- Colonel Radivoje Bojović – Minister of War (1914–1915)
- Colonel/General Božidar Terzić – Minister of War (1915–1918)
- General Mihailo Rašić – Minister of War (1918)
- Colonel/General Miloš Vasić – Commander of the First Army (1916; 1917), Commander of the Third Army (1916)

=== Montenegro ===
- Nicholas I – King of Montenegro, Commander-in-Chief
- General Serdar Janko Vukotić – Prime Minister, Commander of the 1st Montenegrin Army
- (Kingdom of Serbia) General Božidar Janković – Chief of the General Staff of the Montenegrin Army (1914–1915)
- (Kingdom of Serbia) Colonel Petar Pešić – Deputy Chief of the General Staff of the Montenegrin Army (1914–1915), later Chief of the General Staff of the Montenegrin Army (1915–1916)
- Crown Prince Danilo II Petrović-Njegoš – in the staff of the 1st Montenegrin Army
- Brigadier Krsto Popović – in the staff of the 1st Montenegrin Army, Aide-de-camp to Serdar Janko Vukotić
- General Anto Gvozdenović – King's Aide-de-camp
- General Mitar Martinović – commander of several detachments in the Montenegrin Army (Drina and Herzegovina detachments together in 1914–1915, Kotor detachment in 1916)

=== Russia (1914–1917) ===
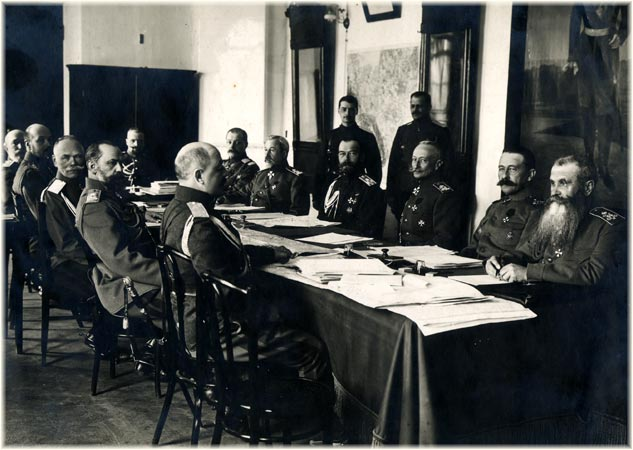
Meeting of the Russian High Command

- Nicholas II – Russian Emperor, King of Poland, and Grand Duke of Finland (until 15 March 1917)
- Grand Duke Nicholas Nikolaevich – Commander-in-Chief (1 August 1914 – 5 September 1916) and viceroy in the Caucasus
- Ivan Goremykin – Chairmen of Council of Ministers of the Russian Empire (1 August 1914 – 2 February 1916)
- Boris Stürmer – Chairmen of Council of Ministers of the Russian Empire (2 February 1916 – 23 November 1916)
- Alexander Trepov – Chairmen of Council of Ministers of the Russian Empire (23 November 1916 – 27 December 1916)
- Nikolai Golitsyn – Chairmen of Council of Ministers of the Russian Empire (27 December 1916 – 9 January 1917)
- General of the Cavalry Alexander Samsonov – Commander of the Russian Second Army for the invasion of East Prussia (1 August 1914 – 29 August 1914)
- General of the Cavalry Paul von Rennenkampf – Commander of the Russian First Army for the invasion of East Prussia (1 August 1914 – November 1914)
- General of the Artillery Nikolay Ivanov – Commander of the Russian Army on the Southwestern Front, (1 August 1914 – March 1916) responsible for much of the action in Galicia
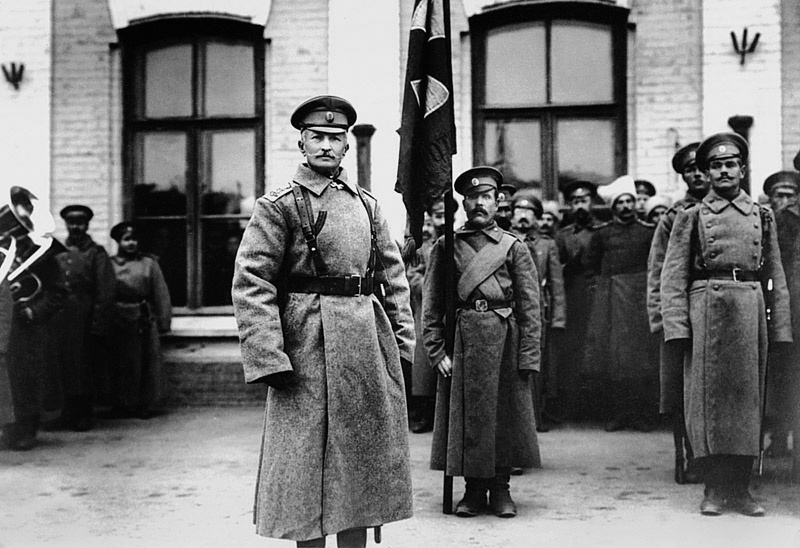
  Aleksei Brusilov in Rivne, Volhynian Governorate, 1915
- General Adjutant Aleksei Brusilov – Commander of the Southwestenr Front, then provisional Commander-in-Chief after the Tsar's abdication (February 1917 – August 1917)
- General of the Infantry Lavr Georgievich Kornilov – Commander of the Southwestern Front, then Commander-in-Chief (August 1917)
- General of the Infantry Aleksey Kuropatkin – Commander of the Northern Front (October 1915 – 1917)
- General of the Infantry Nikolai Yudenich – Commander of the Caucasus (January 1915 – May 1917)
- Admiral Andrei Eberhardt – Commander of the Black Sea Fleet (1914–16)
- Admiral Alexander Kolchak – Commander of the Black Sea Fleet (1916–17)
- Admiral Nikolai Essen – Commander of the Baltic Fleet (1913 – May 1915)

=== Belgium ===
- Albert I of Belgium – King of the Belgians (23 December 1909 – 17 February 1934) and Commander-in-Chief of the Belgian Army
- Charles de Broqueville – Prime Minister (1912–1918); replaced by Gérard Cooreman in June 1918 shortly before the end of the war
- Félix Wielemans – Chief of Staff of the Belgian Army
- Gérard Leman – general commanding the defence of Liège
- Charles Tombeur – commander of the colonial Force Publique in the East African theatre

=== France ===
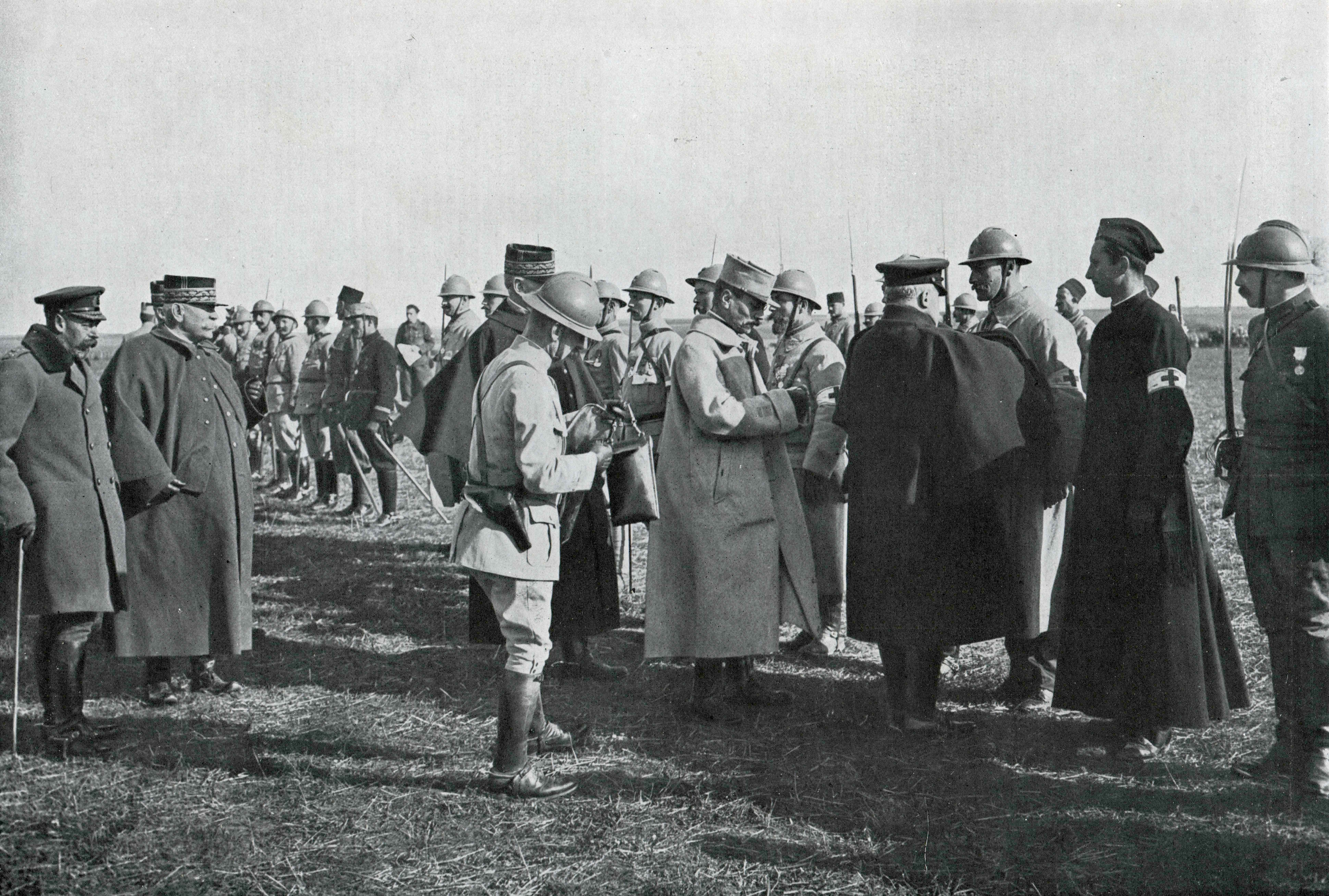
President Raymond Poincaré and King George V, 1915

- Raymond Poincaré – President of France
- René Viviani – Prime Minister of France (13 June 1914 – 29 October 1915)
- Aristide Briand – Prime Minister of France (29 October 1915 – 20 March 1917)
- Alexandre Ribot – Prime Minister of France (20 March 1917 – 12 September 1917)
- Paul Painlevé – Prime Minister of France (12 September 1917 – 16 November 1917)
- Georges Clemenceau – Prime Minister of France (from 16 November 1917)
- Divisional General/Marshal Joseph Joffre – Commander-in-Chief of the French Army (3 August 1914 – 13 December 1916)
- Divisional General Robert Nivelle – Commander-in-Chief of the French Army (13 December 1916 – April 1917)
- Divisional General/Marshal Philippe Pétain – Commander-in-Chief of the French Army (April 1917 – 11 November 1918)
- Divisional General/Marshal Ferdinand Foch – Supreme Allied Commander (26 March 1918 – 11 November 1918)
- Divisional General Maurice Sarrail – Commander of the Allied armies at the Salonika front (1915–1917)
- Army General Adolphe Guillaumat – Commander of the Allied armies at the Salonika front (1917–1918)
- Divisional General/Marshal Louis Franchet d'Espèrey – Commander of the Allied armies at the Salonika front (1918)
- Brigadier General Milan Rastislav Štefánik – general of the French Army, Commander of the Czechoslovak Legions

=== Britain and the British Empire ===
==== United Kingdom ====
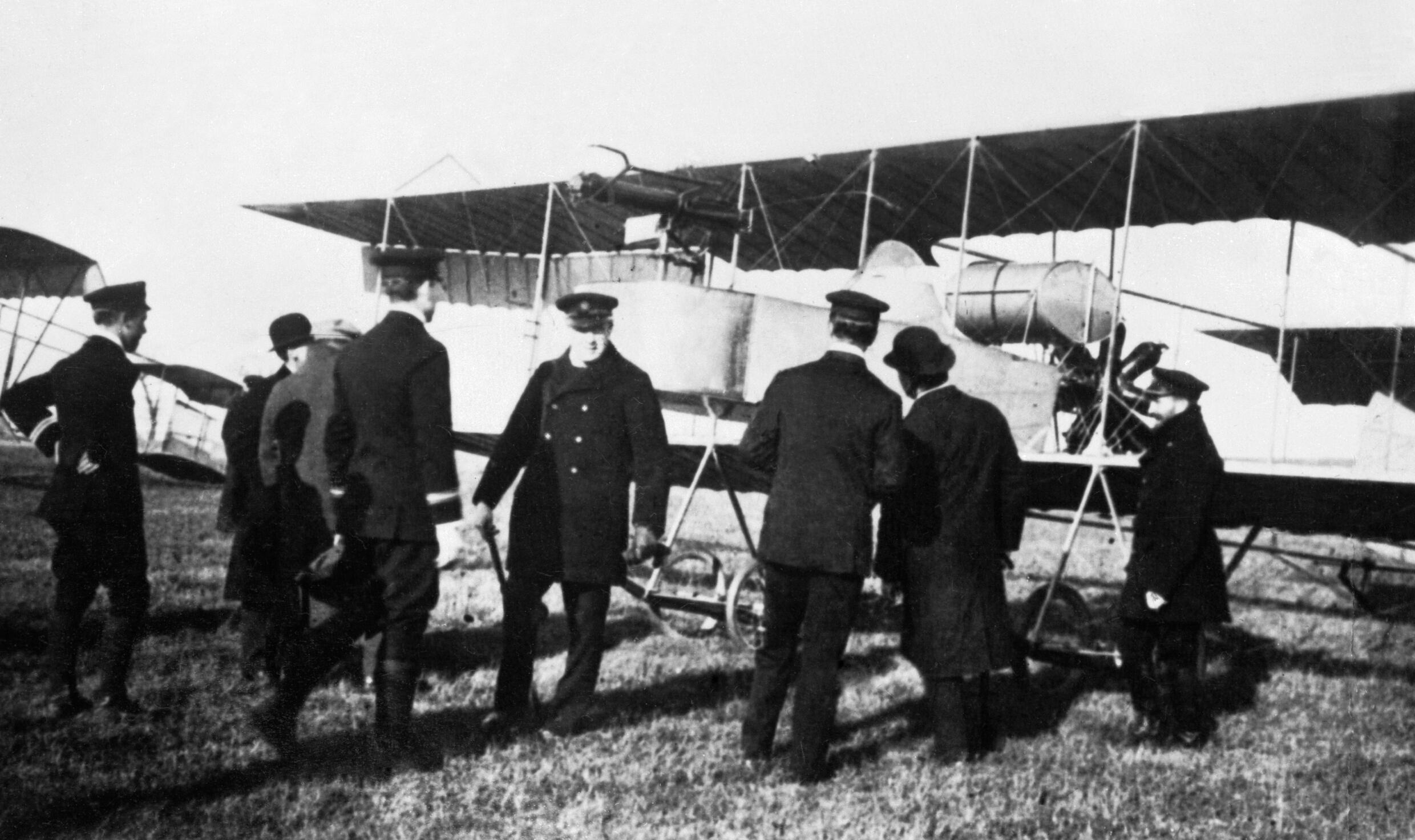
First Lord of the Admiralty Winston Churchill, 1914

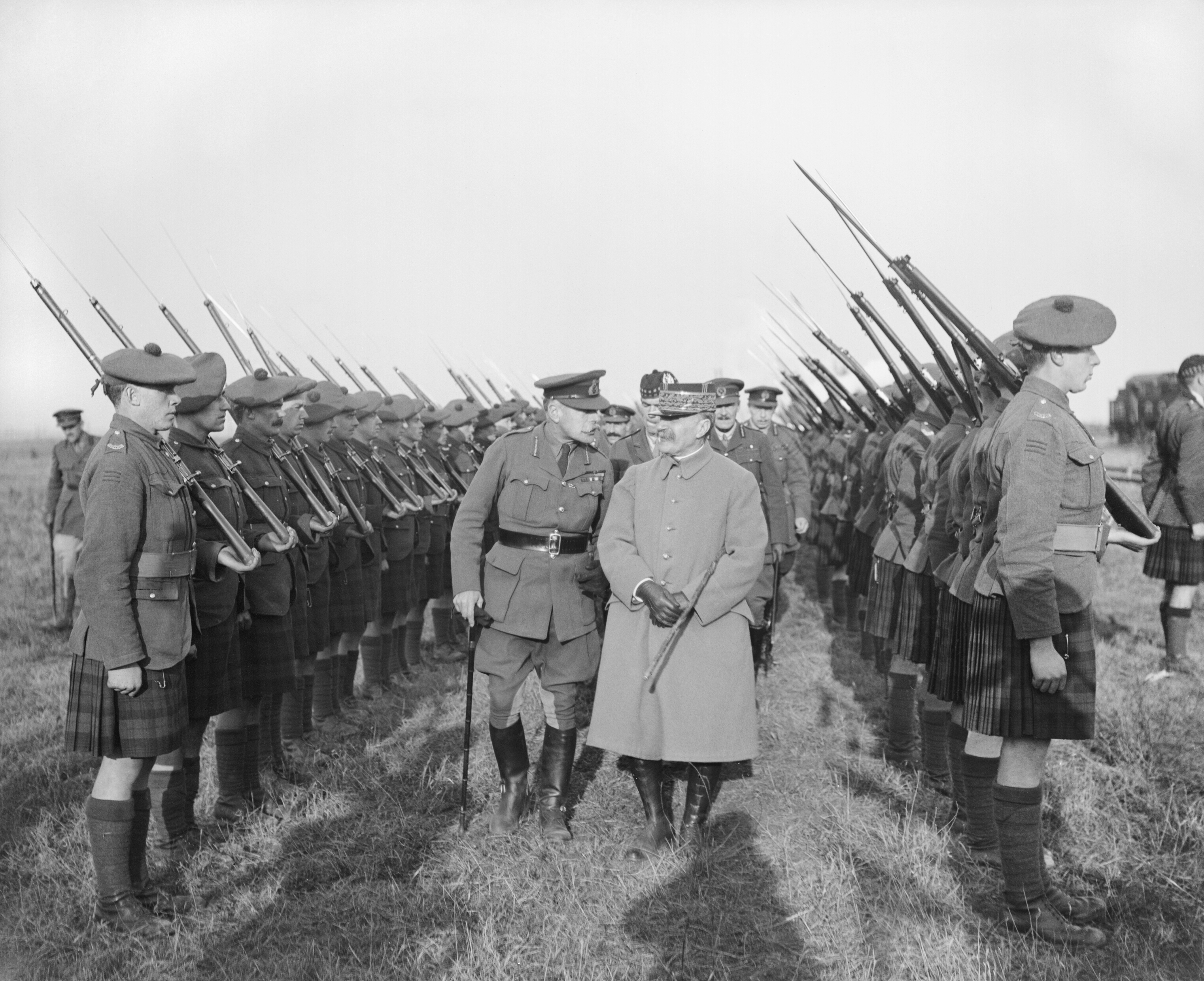
Douglas Haig and Ferdinand Foch inspecting the Gordon Highlanders, 1918

- George V – King of the United Kingdom, and the British Dominions, Emperor of India
- H. H. Asquith – Prime Minister of the United Kingdom (until 5 December 1916)
- David Lloyd George – Prime Minister of the United Kingdom (from 7 December 1916)
- Field Marshal Horatio Herbert Kitchener – Secretary of State for War (5 August 1914 – 5 June 1916)
- Edward Stanley, 17th Earl of Derby – Secretary of State for War (1916– )
- General William Robertson – Chief of the Imperial General Staff (23 December 1915 – February 1918)
- General Henry Wilson – Chief of the Imperial General Staff (February 1918 – February 1922)
- Field Marshal John French – Commander-in-Chief of the British Expeditionary Force (4 August 1914 – 15 December 1915)
- General/Field Marshal Douglas Haig – Commander-in-Chief of the British Expeditionary Force (15 December 1915 – 11 November 1918)
- General Sir David Henderson – Director-General of Military Aeronautics
- General Hugh Trenchard – Commander of the Royal Flying Corps (August 1915 – January 1918) and Chief of the Air Staff of the combined Royal Air Force (1 April 1918 – 13 April 1918)
- Brigadier General Sir Frederick Sykes – Chief of the Air Staff – 13 April 1918 through 11 November 1918 (post-war to 31 March 1919)
- Winston Churchill – First Lord of the Admiralty (1911 – May 1915)
- Arthur Balfour – First Lord of the Admiralty (May 1915 – December 1916)
- Edward Carson – First Lord of the Admiralty (10 December 1916 – 17 July 1917)
- Eric Geddes – First Lord of the Admiralty (July 1917 – January 1919)
- Admiral of the Fleet John "Jackie" Fisher – First Sea Lord (1914 – May 1915)
- Admiral Henry Jackson – First Sea Lord (May 1915 – November 1916)
- Admiral John Jellicoe – Commander of the Grand Fleet (August 1914 – November 1916); First Sea Lord (November 1916 – December 1917)
- Admiral Rosslyn Wemyss – First Sea Lord (December 1917 – November 1919)
- Admiral David Beatty – Commander of the Grand Fleet (November 1916 – April 1919)
- General Archibald Murray – Commander of the Egyptian Expeditionary Force (January 1916 – June 1917)
- General Edmund Allenby – Commander of the Egyptian Expeditionary Force (June 1917 – November 1918)
- Eric John Eagles Swayne – Commander of British forces in the Somaliland Campaign
- William Peyton – commander and military secretary to the British Expeditionary Force
- Colonel T. E. Lawrence – a main leader of the Arab Revolt

==== Dominion of Canada ====
- Robert Borden – Prime Minister of Canada (1914–18)
- Sam Hughes – Minister of Militia and Defence (1914 – January 1915)
- Joseph Flavelle – Chairman of the Imperial Munitions Board (1915–19)
- (United Kingdom of Great Britain and Ireland) Lieutenant-General Edwin Alderson – Commander of the unified Canadian Corps of the Canadian Expeditionary Force (26 January 1915 – September 1915)
- (United Kingdom of Great Britain and Ireland) General Julian Byng – Commander of the unified Canadian Corps of the Canadian Expeditionary Force (June 1916 – June 1917)
- General Arthur Currie – Commander of the unified Canadian Corps of the Canadian Expeditionary Force (June 1917 – August 1919)

==== Commonwealth of Australia ====
- Joseph Cook – Prime Minister of Australia (until 17 September 1914)
- Andrew Fisher – Prime Minister of Australia (17 September 1914 – 27 October 1915)
- Billy Hughes – Prime Minister of Australia (from 27 October 1915)
- (United Kingdom of Great Britain and Ireland) General William Birdwood – Commander of the Australian Corps (all five Australian infantry divisions serving on the Western Front) (November 1917 – May 1918)
- Lieutenant General Sir John Monash – Commander of the Australian Corps (May 1918 –)
- Major General William Holmes – Commander of the Australian Naval and Military Expeditionary Force (August 1914 – February 1915)
- Lieutenant General Sir Harry Chauvel – Commander of the Desert Mounted Corps (Sinai and Palestine) (August 1917 –)

==== British India ====
- Charles Hardinge, 1st Baron Hardinge of Penshurst – Viceroy of India (1910–1916)
- Frederic Thesiger, 1st Viscount Chelmsford – Viceroy of India (1916–1921)
- Robert Crewe-Milnes, 1st Marquess of Crewe – Secretary of State for India (May 1911 – May 1915)
- Austen Chamberlain – Secretary of State for India (May 1915 – July 1917)
- Edwin Samuel Montagu – Secretary of State for India (July 1917 – March 1922)
- Beauchamp Duff – Commander-in-Chief, India (March 1914 – October 1916)
- Charles Monro – Commander-in-Chief, India (October 1916 – November 1920)
- Lieutenant-General John Nixon – commander of the British Indian Army (active in the Middle East)

==== Union of South Africa ====
- General Louis Botha – Prime Minister of South Africa
- General Jan Smuts – led forces in the South West Africa Campaign and East African Campaign, later a member of the Imperial War Cabinet

==== Dominion of New Zealand ====
- William Massey – Prime Minister of New Zealand
- General Sir Alexander Godley – Commandant of New Zealand Military Forces (to October 1914); Commander of the New Zealand Expeditionary Forces
- Major General Sir Alfred William Robin – Quartermaster-General and Commandant of New Zealand Military Forces (from October 1914)
- Major General Sir Andrew Hamilton Russell – Commander of the New Zealand Division

==== Dominion of Newfoundland ====
- Sir Edward Morris – Prime Minister of Newfoundland (1909–1917)
- Sir John Crosbie – Prime Minister of Newfoundland (1917–1918)
- Sir William Lloyd – Prime Minister of Newfoundland (1918–1919)

=== Japan ===
- Emperor Taishō – Emperor of Japan
- Ōkuma Shigenobu – Prime Minister of Japan (16 April 1914 – 9 October 1916)
- Terauchi Masatake – Prime Minister of Japan (9 October 1916 – 29 September 1918)
- Hara Takashi – Prime Minister of Japan (29 September 1918 – 4 November 1921)
- Katō Sadakichi – Commander-in-Chief of the Second Fleet deployed to the Siege of Tsingtao
- Kōzō Satō – Commander of the Second Special Task Fleet
- Kamio Mitsuomi – Commander of Allied land forces at Tsingtao

=== Italy (1915–1918) ===
- Victor Emmanuel III – King of Italy
- Antonio Salandra – Prime Minister (until 18 June 1916)
- Paolo Boselli – Prime Minister (18 June 1916 – 29 October 1917)
- Vittorio Emanuele Orlando – Prime Minister (from 29 October 1917)
- Luigi Cadorna – Commander-in-Chief of the Royal Italian Army
- Armando Diaz – Chief of General Staff of the Royal Italian Army
- Luigi, Duke of Abruzzi – Commander-in-Chief of the Adriatic Fleet of Italy (1914–17)
- Paolo Thaon di Revel – Admiral of the Royal Italian Navy

=== Romania (1916–1918) ===
- Ferdinand I – King of Romania
- General Constantin Prezan – Chief of the General Staff of Romania
- Ion I. C. Brătianu – Prime Minister of Romania
- Vintilă Brătianu – Secretary of War
- Field Marshal Alexandru Averescu – Commander of the 2nd Army, 3rd Army, then Army Group South
- General Eremia Grigorescu – Commander of the 1st Army

=== Portugal (1916–1918) ===
- Bernardino Machado – President of Portugal (until 12 December 1917)
- Afonso Costa – Prime Minister of Portugal (until 15 March 1916; then again 25 April 1917 – 10 December 1917)
- António José de Almeida – Prime Minister of Portugal (15 March 1916 – 25 April 1917)
- Sidónio Pais – Prime Minister of Portugal and War Minister (11 December 1917 – 9 May 1918) and President of Portugal (from 9 May 1918)
- José Norton de Matos – War Minister (until 10 December 1917)
- João Tamagnini Barbosa – Interim War Minister (9 May 1918 – 15 May 1918)
- Amílcar Mota – Secretary of State for War (15 May 1918 – 8 October 1918)
- Álvaro de Mendonça – Secretary of State for War (from 8 October 1918)
- Fernando Tamagnini de Abreu – Commander of the Portuguese Expeditionary Corps (CEP)
- José Augusto Alves Roçadas – Commander of the Portuguese Forces in Southern Angola
- José Luís de Moura Mendes – Commander of the Portuguese Forces in Eastern Africa (until June 1916)
- José César Ferreira Gil – Commander of the Portuguese Forces in Eastern Africa (from June 1916)
- Sousa Rosa – Commander of the Portuguese Forces in Eastern Africa (from 1917)

=== Greece (1916/17–1918) ===
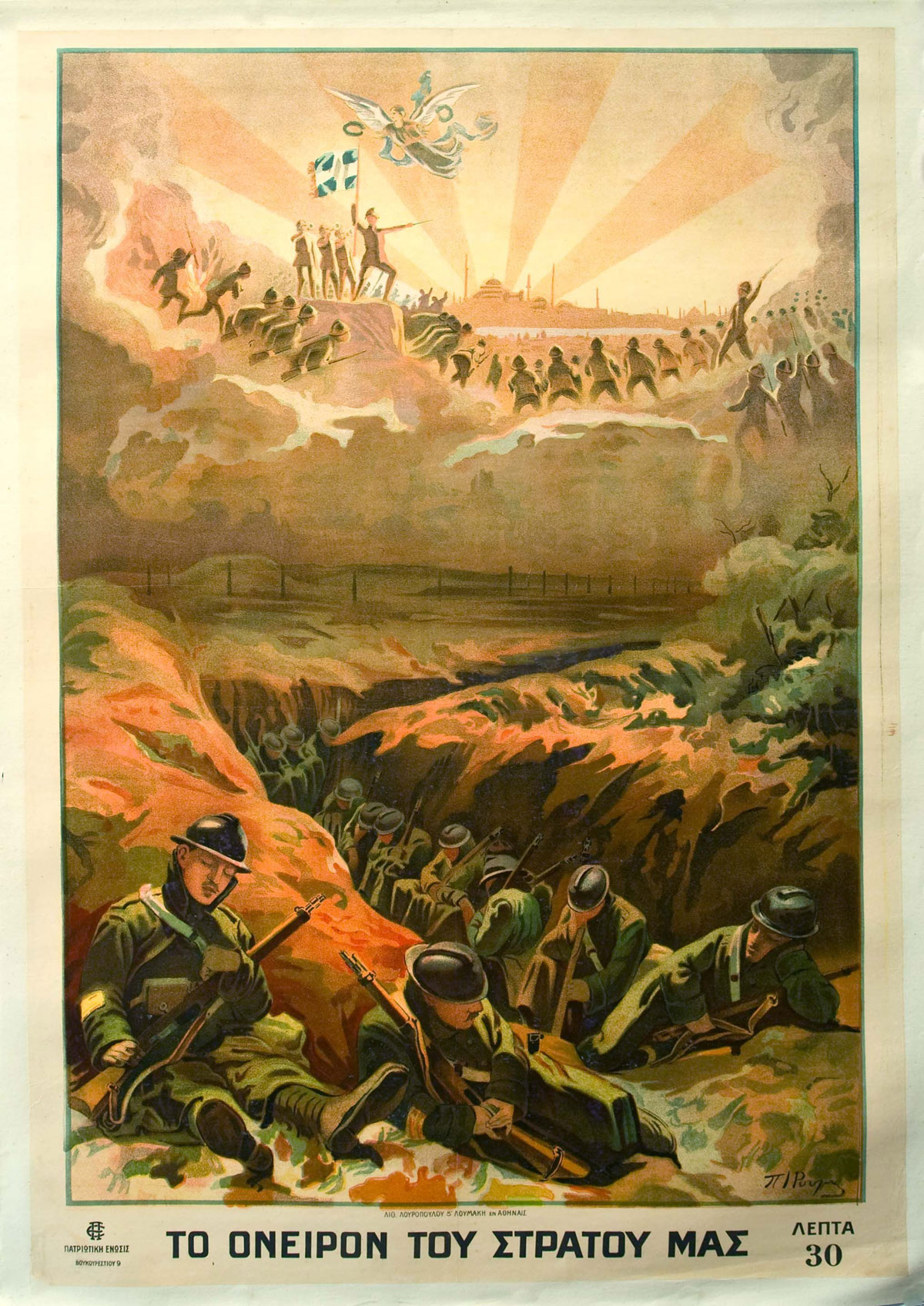
Greek propaganda poster

- Constantine I: King of Greece, he retired from the throne in June 1917, due to Allied pressure, without formally abdicating.
- Alexander: King of Greece from 1917 after his father was forced into exile
- Eleftherios Venizelos: Prime Minister of Greece after 13 June 1917
- Panagiotis Danglis: Greek general of the Hellenic Army

=== United States (1917–1918) ===
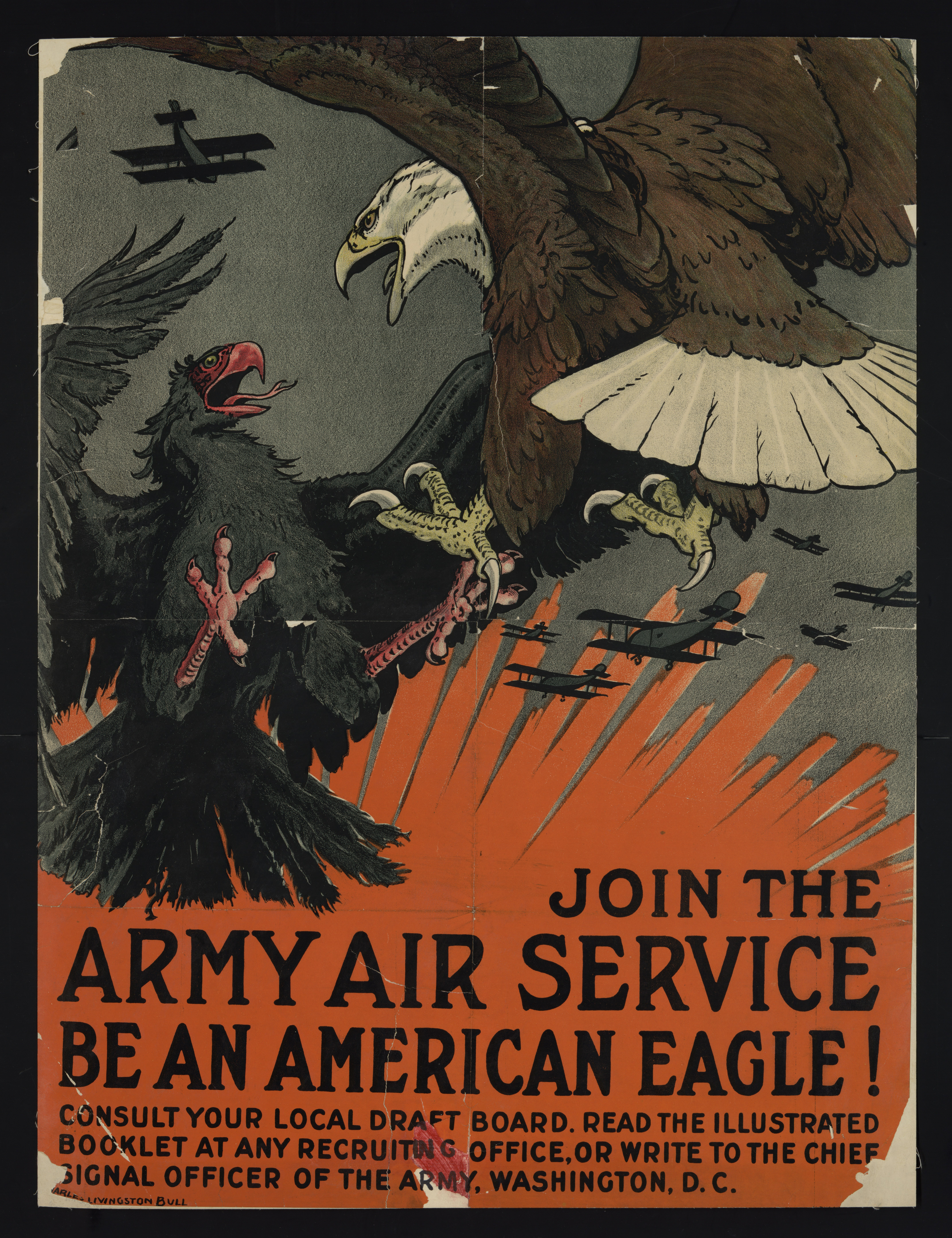
USAAS recruiting poster, 1918

- Woodrow Wilson – President of the United States/Commander-In-Chief of the US Armed Forces
- Newton D. Baker – US Secretary of War
- Josephus Daniels – US Secretary of the Navy
- Major General/General John J. Pershing – Commander of the American Expeditionary Forces
- Rear Admiral/Vice Admiral William Sims – Commander of US Naval Forces in European Waters
- Brigadier General Mason Patrick – Commander of the US Army Air Service

=== Siam (1917–1918) ===
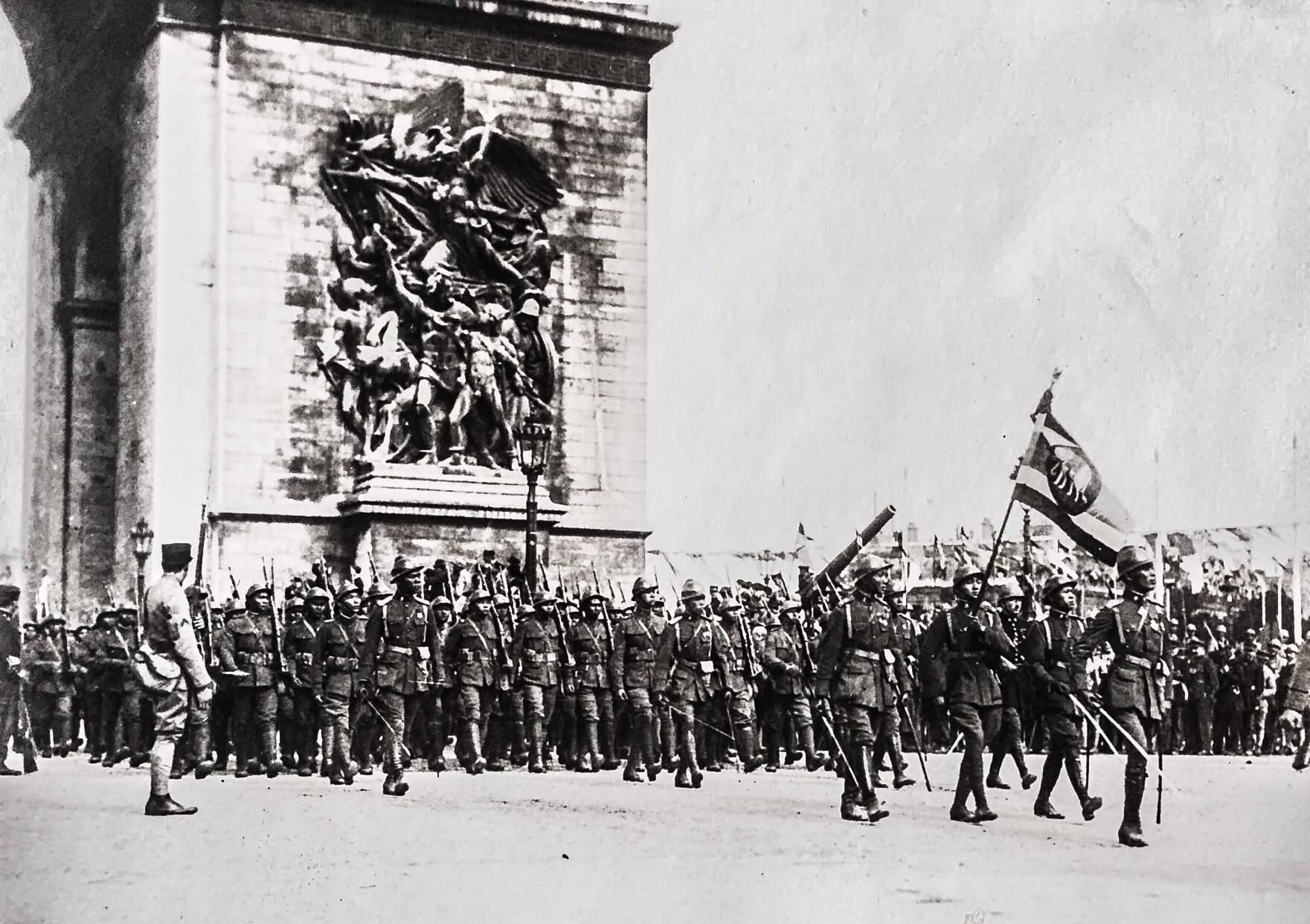
Troops of the Siamese Expeditionary Forces marching in Paris, 1919

- Vajiravudh, King of Siam
- Chaophraya Bodindechanuchit, Minister of Defence
- Chakrabongse Bhuvanath, Supreme Commander of the Siamese Expeditionary Forces in World War I
- Phraya Thephatsadin, Commander of the Siamese Expeditionary Forces in the Western Front

=== Brazil (1917–1918) ===
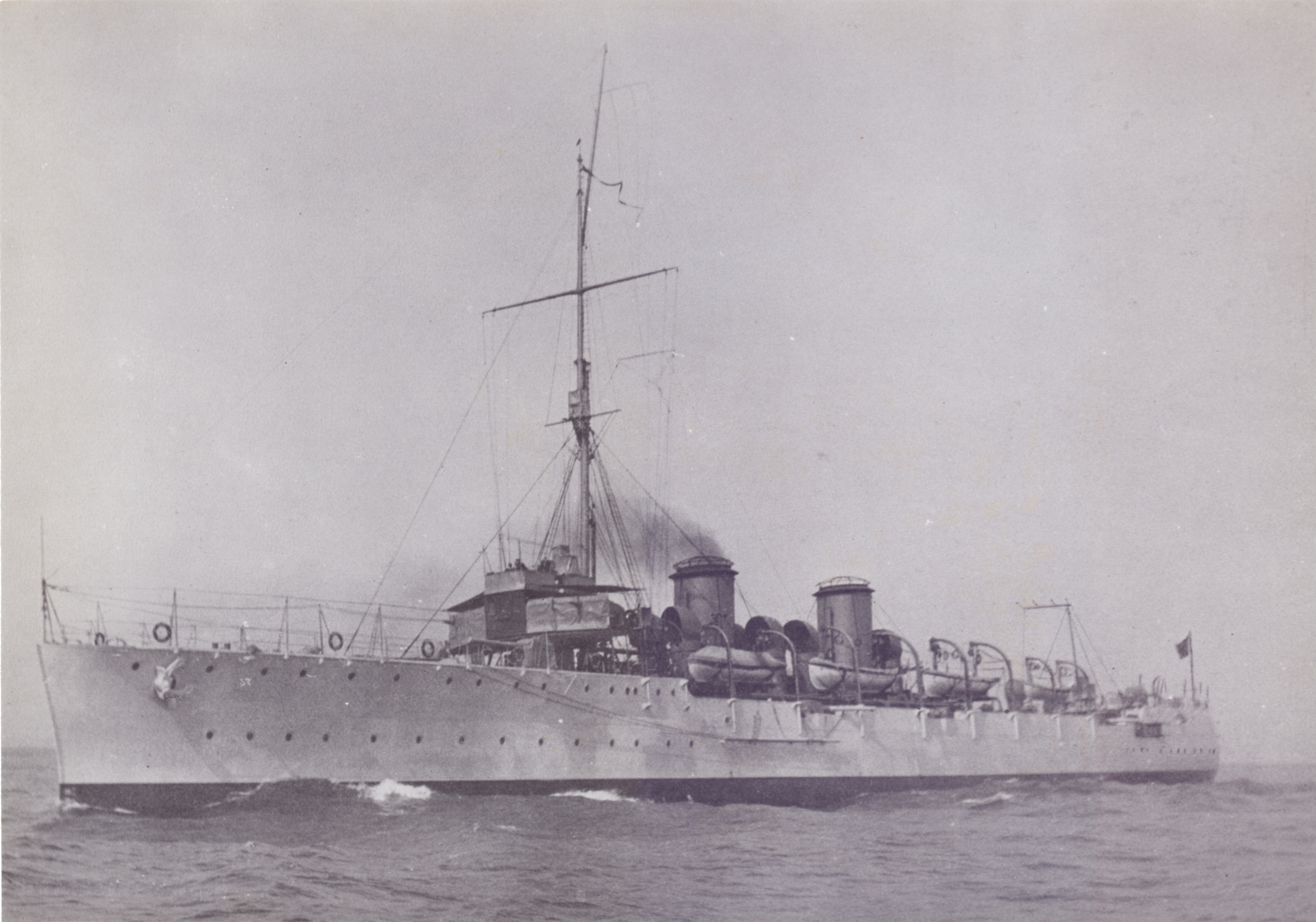
The Brazilian ship Cruzador Bahia

- Venceslau Brás – President of Brazil (1914–1918)
- Caetano de Faria – Minister of War (1914–1918)
- Alexandrino de Alencar – Minister of the Navy (1913–1918)
- Pedro de Frontin – Chief of the Divisão Naval em Operações de Guerra (Naval Division in War Operations)
- Napoleão Felipe Aché – Chief of the Brazilian Military Mission in France (1918–1919)
- Nabuco Gouveia – Chief of Brazilian Military Medical Commission

=== Armenia (1917–1918) ===
- Hovhannes Kajaznuni – first Prime Minister of the First Republic of Armenia
- General Andranik – military commander and statesman of the Caucasus Campaign
- Aram Manukian – Minister of Internal Affairs of the First Republic of Armenia
- Drastamat Kanayan – military commander and member of the Armenian Revolutionary Federation
- Tovmas Nazarbekian – Commander-in-Chief of the First Republic of Armenia
- Movses Silikyan – army general and national hero

=== Czechoslovakia (1918) ===
- Tomáš Garrigue Masaryk – first President of Czechoslovakia
- Milan Rastislav Štefánik – Commander of the Czechoslovak Legion
- Edvard Beneš – Minister of Foreign Affairs and the Interior

== Personnel and casualties ==
A pie-chart showing the military deaths of the Allied Powers

These are estimates of the cumulative number of different personnel in uniform 1914–1918, including army, navy and auxiliary forces. At any one time, the various forces were much smaller. Only a fraction of them were frontline combat troops. The numbers do not reflect the length of time each country was involved.

World War I personnel and casualties, by country
| Allied power | Mobilised personnel | Military fatalities | Wounded in action | Casualties, total | Casualties, % of total mobilised |
|---|---|---|---|---|---|
| Australia | 412,953 | 61,928 (14.99%) (Note: Australia casualties Included in total are 55,000 killed or missing in action and died of wounds-. The Commonwealth War Graves Commission Annual Report 2005–2006 is the source of total military dead.– Totals include 2,005 military deaths during 1919–21–. The 1922 War Office report listed 59,330 Army war dead.) | 152,171 | 214,099 | 52% |
| Belgium | 267,000 | 38,172 (14.29%) (Note: Belgium casualties Included in total are 35,000 killed or missing in action and died of wounds Figures include 13,716 killed and 24,456 missing up until Nov.11, 1918. "These figures are approximate only, the records being incomplete." .) | 44,686 | 82,858 | 31% |
| Brazil | 1,713 | 100 (5.84%) | 0 | 100 | 5.84% |
| Canada | 628,964 | 64,944 (10.32%) (Note: Canada casualties Included in total are 53,000 killed or missing in action and died of wounds. The Commonwealth War Graves Commission Annual Report 2005–2006 is the source of total military dead. Totals include 3,789 military deaths during 1919–21 and 150 Merchant Navy deaths–. The losses of Newfoundland are listed separately on this table. The 1922 War Office report listed 56,639 Army war dead.) | 149,732 | 214,676 | 34% |
| France | 8,410,000 | 1,397,800 (16.62%) (Note: France casualties Included in total are 1,186,000 killed or missing in action and died of wounds. Totals include the deaths of 71,100 French colonial troops.-Figures include war related military deaths of 28,600 from 11/11/1918 to 6/1/1919.) | 4,266,000 | 5,663,800 | 67% |
| Greece | 230,000 | 26,000 (11.30%) (Note: Greece casualties Jean Bujac in a campaign history of the Greek Army in World War One listed 8,365 combat related deaths and 3,255 missing, The Soviet researcher Boris Urlanis estimated total dead of 26,000 including 15,000 military deaths due disease) | 21,000 | 47,000 | 20% |
| India | 1,440,437 | 74,187 (5.15%) (Note: India casualties British India included present-day India, Pakistan and Bangladesh. Included in total are 27,000 killed or missing in action and died of wounds. The Commonwealth War Graves Commission Annual Report 2005–2006 is the source of total military dead. Totals include 15,069 military deaths during 1919–21 and 1,841 Canadian Merchant Navy dead. The 1922 War Office report listed 64,454 Army war dead) | 69,214 | 143,401 | 10% |
| Italy | 5,615,000 | 651,010 (11.59%) (Note: Italy casualties Included in total are 433,000 killed or missing in action and died of wounds Figures of total military dead are from a 1925 Italian report using official data.) | 953,886 | 1,604,896 | 29% |
| Japan | 800,000 | 415 (0.05%) (Note: War dead figure is from a 1991 history of the Japanese Army.) | 907 | 1,322 | <1% |
| Monaco | 80 | 8 (10.00%) | 0 | 8 | 10% |
| Montenegro | 50,000 | 3,000 (6.00%) | 10,000 | 13,000 | 26% |
| Nepal | 200,000 | 30,670 (15.33%) | 21,009 | 49,823 | 25% |
| New Zealand | 128,525 | 18,050 (14.04%) (Note: New Zealand casualties Included in total are 14,000 killed or missing in action and died of wounds. The Commonwealth War Graves Commission Annual Report 2005–2006 is the source of total military dead. Totals include 702 military deaths during 1919–21. The 1922 War Office report listed 16,711 Army war dead.) | 41,317 | 59,367 | 46% |
| Portugal | 100,000 | 7,222 (7.22%) (Note: Portugal casualties Figures include the following killed and died of other causes up until Jan.1, 1920; 1,689 in France and 5,332 in Africa. Figures do not include an additional 12,318 listed as missing and POW.) | 13,751 | 20,973 | 21% |
| Romania | 750,000 | 250,000 (33.33%) (Note: Romania casualties Military dead is "The figure reported by the Rumanian Government in reply to a questionnaire from the International Labour Office". Included in total are 177,000 killed or missing in action and died of wounds.) | 120,000 | 370,000 | 49% |
| Russia | 12,000,000 | 1,811,000 (15.09%) (Note: Russia casualties Included in total are 1,451,000 killed or missing in action and died of wounds. The estimate of total Russian military losses was made by the Soviet researcher Boris Urlanis.) | 4,950,000 | 6,761,000 | 56% |
| Serbia | 707,343 | 275,000 (38.87%) (Note: Serbia casualties Included in total are 165,000 killed or missing in action and died of wounds. The estimate of total combined Serbian and Montenegrin military losses of 278,000 was made by the Soviet researcher Boris Urlanis) | 133,148 | 408,148 | 58% |
| Siam | 1,284 | 19 (1.48%) | 0 | 19 | 2% |
| South Africa | 136,070 | 9,463 (6.95%) (Note: South Africa casualties Included in total are 5,000 killed or missing in action and died of wounds The Commonwealth War Graves Commission Annual Report 2005–2006 is the source of total military dead. Totals include 380 military deaths during 1919–21^{15}. The 1922 War Office report listed 7,121 Army war dead.) | 12,029 | 21,492 | 16% |
| United Kingdom | 6,211,922 | 886,342 (14.26%) (Note: UK and Crown Colonies casualties Included in total are 624,000 killed or missing in action and died of wounds. The Commonwealth War Graves Commission Annual Report 2005–2006 is the source of total military dead. Military dead total includes 34,663 deaths during 1919–21 and 13,632 British Merchant Navy deaths. The 1922 War Office report listed 702,410 war dead for the UK, 507 from "Other colonies" and the Royal Navy (32,287). The British Merchant Navy losses of 14,661 were listed separately; The 1922 War Office report detailed the deaths of 310 military personnel due to air and sea bombardment of the UK.) | 1,665,749 | 2,552,091 | 41% |
| United States | 4,355,000 | 53,402 (1.23%) (Note: United States casualties Official military war deaths listed by the US Dept. of Defense for the period ending 31 Dec 1918 are 116,516; which includes 53,402 battle deaths and 63,114 other deaths. "Principal Wars in Which the United States Participated U.S. Military Personnel Serving and Casualties a/" (PDF). Department of Defense Statistical Information Analysis Division. Archived from the original (PDF) on 25 January 2007. The US Coast Guard lost an additional 192 dead .) | 205,690 | 259,092 | 5.9% |
| Total | 42,244,409 | 5,741,389 | 12,925,833 | 18,744,547 | 49% |

== See also ==
- Allied intervention in the Russian Civil War
- Causes of World War I
- Color books, transcripts of official documents released by each nation early in the war
- Diplomatic history of World War I
  - British entry into World War I
  - French entry into World War I
- Historiography of the causes of World War I
- Home front during World War I
  - Belgium in World War I
  - France in World War I
  - Germany in World War I
  - Italy in World War I
  - Romania in World War I
  - United Kingdom in World War I
  - United States in World War I
  - Japan in World War I
- International relations of the Great Powers (1814–1919)
- July Crisis
- War aims of the First World War

== Bibliography ==
- Ellis, John; Cox, Mike (2002). The World War I Databook: The Essential Facts and Figures for All the Combatants.
- Esposito, Vincent J. (1997). The West Point Atlas of American Wars: 1900–1918.
- Falls, Cyril (1960). The Great War.
- Gilbert, Martin (1995). First World War. HarperCollins. ISBN 978-0006376668. OCLC 1244719073.
- Gooch, G. P. (1940). Recent Revelations of European Diplomacy.
- Higham, Robin; Showalter, Dennis E., eds. (2003). Researching World War I: A Handbook.
- Pope, Stephen; Wheal, Elizabeth-Anne, eds. (1995). The Macmillan Dictionary of the First World War.
- Strachan, Hew (2004). The First World War, Volume I: To Arms.
- Trask, David F. (1961). The United States in the Supreme War Council: American War Aims and Inter-Allied Strategy, 1917–1918.
- Tucker, Spencer C. (1999). The European Powers in the First World War: An Encyclopedia. New York: Garland. ISBN 978-0-8153-3351-7.
- Spencer Tucker, ed. (2005). The Encyclopedia of World War I: A Political, Social, and Military History. Vol. 5.
- United States. War Dept. General Staff (1916). Strength and Organisation of the Armies of France, Germany, Austria, Russia, England, Italy, Mexico and Japan (Showing Conditions in July, 1914).
- The War Office (2006) [1922]. Statistics of the Military Effort of the British Empire During the Great War 1914–1920. Uckfield, East Sussex: Military and Naval Press. ISBN 978-1-84734-681-0. OCLC 137236769.
- CWGC (2006). "Annual Report 2005–2006" (PDF). Archived from the original (PDF) on 16 June 2007.
- CWGC (2012). "Debt of Honour Register". Archived from the original on 18 January 2012.
- Urlanis, Boris (2003) [1971, Moscow]. Wars and Population. Honolulu: University Press of the Pacific. OCLC 123124938.
- Huber, Michel (1931). La population de la France pendant la guerre, avec un appendice sur Les revenus avant et après la guerre (in French). Paris: Charles-Lavauzelle. OCLC 4226464.
- Bujac, Jean Léopold Emile (1930). Les campagnes de l'armèe Hellènique 1918–1922 (in French). Paris: Charles-Lavauzelle. OCLC 10808602.
- Mortara, Giorgio (1925). La Salute pubblica in Italia durante e dopo la Guerra (in Italian). New Haven, CT: Yale University Press. OCLC 2099099.
- Harries, Merion; Harries, Susie (1991). Soldiers of the Sun: The Rise and Fall of the Imperial Japanese Army. Random House. ISBN 978-0-679-75303-2. OCLC 32615324.
- Clodfelter, Micheal (2002). Warfare and Armed Conflicts: A Statistical Reference to Casualty and Other Figures, 1500–2000 (2nd ed.). London: McFarland. ISBN 978-0-7864-1204-4. OCLC 48066096.
- Donato, Hernâni (1987). Dicionário das Batalhas Brasileiras. Rio de Janeiro: IBRASA. ISBN 978-85-348-0034-1.
