= Splendid isolation =

19th-century British diplomatic practice

Splendid isolation is a term used to describe the 19th-century British diplomatic practice of avoiding permanent alliances from 1815 to 1902. The concept developed as early as 1822, when Britain left the post-1815 Concert of Europe, and continued until the 1902 Anglo-Japanese Alliance and the 1904 Entente Cordiale with France. As Europe was divided into two power blocs, Britain became aligned with the French Third Republic and the Russian Empire (known as the Triple Entente) against the German Empire, Austria-Hungary and the Kingdom of Italy (The Triple Alliance).

The term was coined in January 1896 by a Canadian politician, George Eulas Foster. He indicated his approval for Britain's minimal involvement in European affairs by saying "In these somewhat troublesome days when the great Mother Empire stands splendidly isolated in Europe."

There is considerable historical debate over the extent to which this approach was intentional or accidental, its impact, or even if it ever existed, other than as a useful phrase.

== Background ==
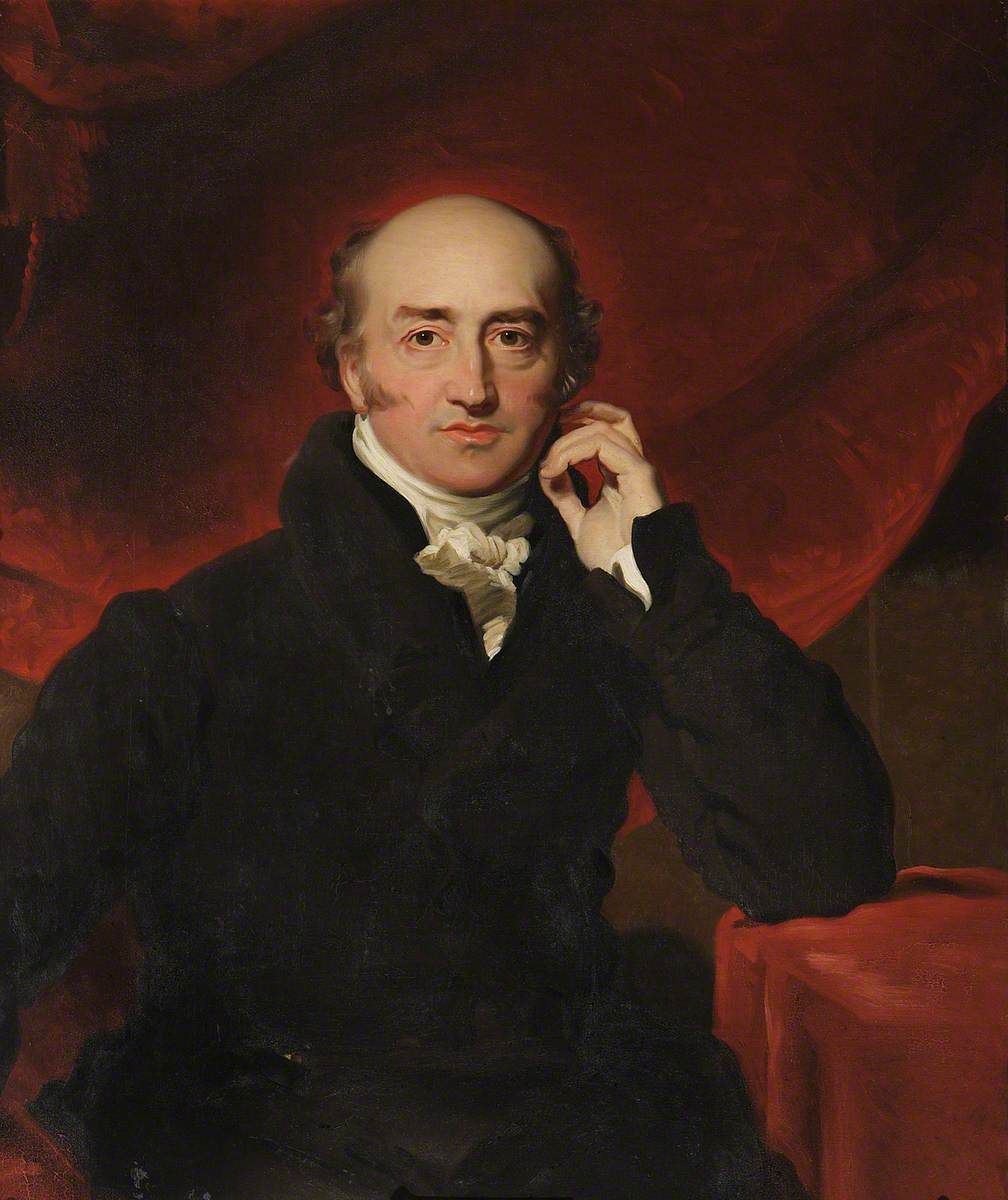
Foreign Secretary George Canning (1770–1827), reputed originator of the policy

Nineteenth-century British foreign policy was characterised by a reluctance to enter into permanent alliances with other Great Powers. Often assumed to apply only to the latter part of the century, some historians argue it originated after the 1822 Congress of Verona, when Britain withdrew from the post-1815 Concert of Europe, guided by Foreign Secretary George Canning. His principles dominated British foreign policy for decades, and have been summarised as follows;

Non-intervention; no European police system; every nation for itself, and God for us all; balance of power; respect for facts, not for abstract theories; respect for treaty rights, but caution in extending them...England not Europe...Europe's domain extends to the shores of the Atlantic, England's begins there.

For much of the 19th century, Britain sought to maintain the existing balance of power in Europe, while protecting trade routes to its colonies and dominions, especially those connecting to British India through the Suez Canal. In 1866, the Foreign Secretary Lord Derby explained this policy as follows:

It is the duty of the Government of this country, placed as it is with regard to geographical position, to keep itself upon terms of goodwill with all surrounding nations, but not to entangle itself with any single or monopolising alliance with any one of them; above all to endeavour not to interfere needlessly and vexatiously with the internal affairs of any foreign country.

One exception was the 1839 Treaty of London, recognising the independence of Belgium, which led to Britain entering World War I in 1914. The ports of Ostend, Antwerp and Zeebrugge were so important to ensuring control of the English Channel, Britain guaranteed Belgian independence, by military means if required.

== Bismarck and Salisbury ==
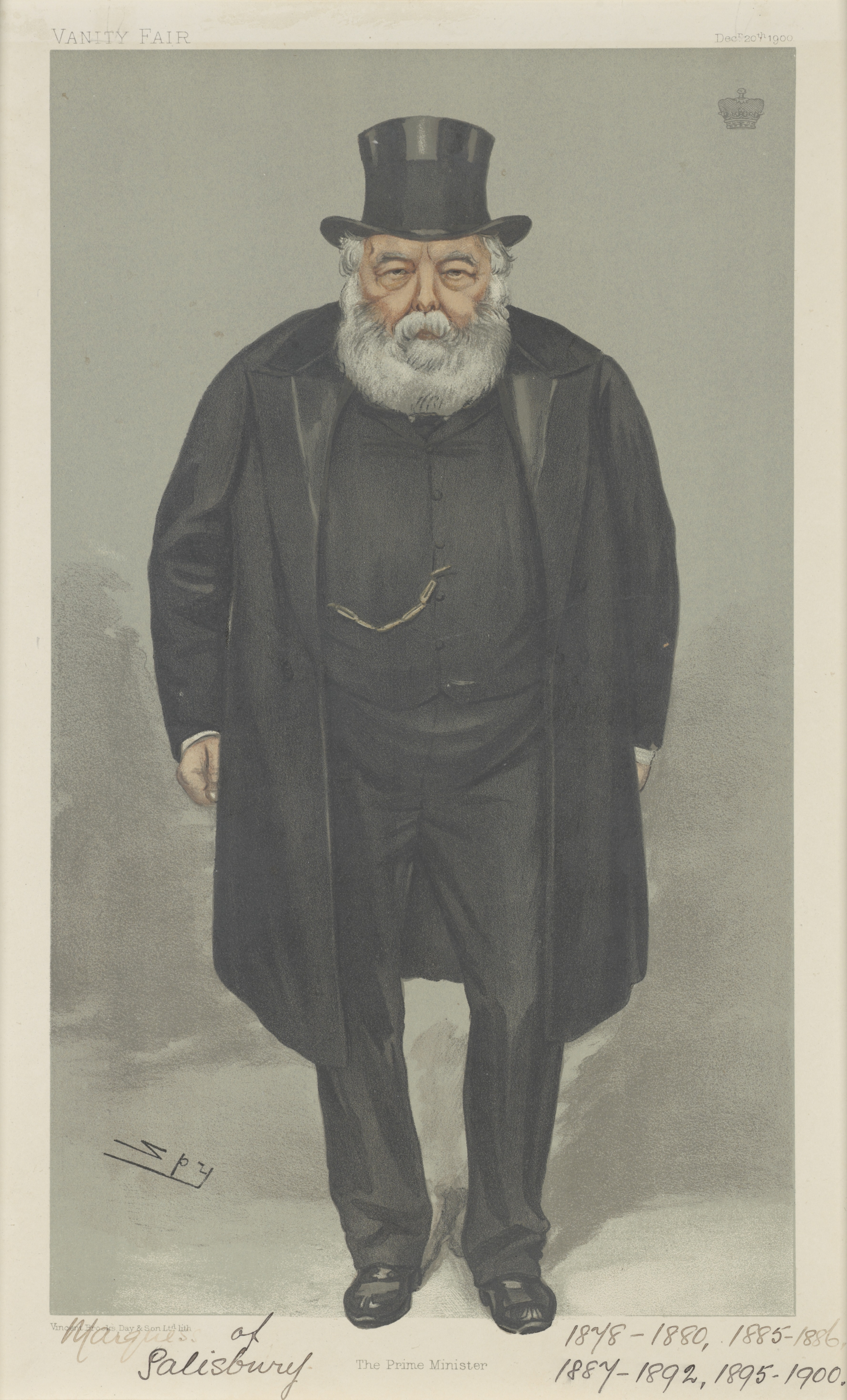
Lord Salisbury caricatured by Spy, 1900

After the founding of the German Reich in 1871, German Chancellor Bismarck created the 1873 League of the Three Emperors, or Dreikaiserbund, between Austria-Hungary, Russia and Germany. In 1878, the League collapsed due to competing Austrian and Russian aims in the Balkans, with Germany and Austria-Hungary forming the 1879 Dual Alliance. This became the Triple Alliance in 1882 with the addition of Italy.

Unlike his successors, Bismarck viewed a war on two fronts as potentially fatal for Germany; his key foreign policy aims were friendship with Russia, and the isolation of France. When the French attempted to negotiate a Russian alliance in 1881, he persuaded Austria and Russia to join a reconstituted Dreikaiserbund. Even after the League finally dissolved in 1887, Bismarck replaced it with the Reinsurance Treaty, a secret agreement with Russia to observe 'benevolent neutrality', in the event of an attack by France on Germany, or Austria-Hungary on Russia.

British Prime Minister Lord Salisbury once defined his foreign policy as "to float lazily downstream, putting out the occasional diplomatic boathook." He defined this as avoiding war with another Great Power, or combination of Powers, and securing communications with the Empire. A recurring concern was Russian access to the Mediterranean, in this case by acquiring Constantinople and the Dardanelles. (Note: This was, and remains, a long-standing Russian objective; in 1914, 50 per cent of total Russian exports, and 90 per cent of agricultural, went through the Straits. The Russian naval facility in Tartus was a key element driving their involvement in the Syrian civil war.) A factor in the 1853–1856 Crimean War, it resurfaced during the 1875–1878 Great Eastern Crisis, when jingoism demonstrated a growing sense of insecurity among British media and politicians.

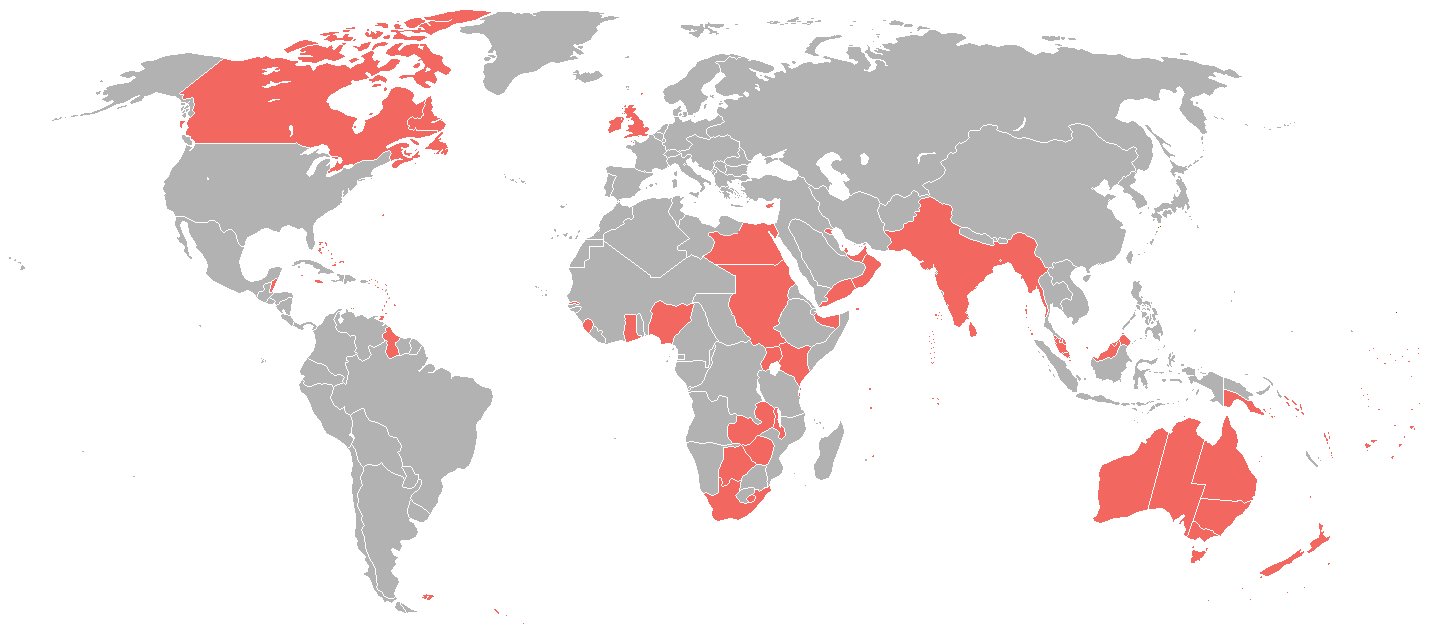
The British Empire in 1898

After occupying Egypt in the 1882 Anglo-Egyptian War, Britain negotiated the 1887 Mediterranean Agreements with Italy and Austria-Hungary. These were not considered treaties, simply an undertaking to discuss problems should they arise, and thus did not require approval by Parliament. Since Britain shared Austrian concern over Russian expansion in South-East Europe, and Austria generally followed Germany, it allowed Salisbury and Bismarck to align without a formal alliance.

In the 1885 Panjdeh incident, Russian troops occupied an oasis near the disputed border between Afghanistan and Russian-occupied Turkmenistan. Always sensitive to potential threats in this area, Britain threatened a military response, before both sides backed down, and agreed a negotiated solution. However, the Ottomans refused a British request to allow warships access to the Black Sea, a position strongly supported by all the European powers. Taylor suggests it was "the most formidable display of Continental hostility to Britain between Napoleon's day and Hitler's".

== Post-Bismarck ==
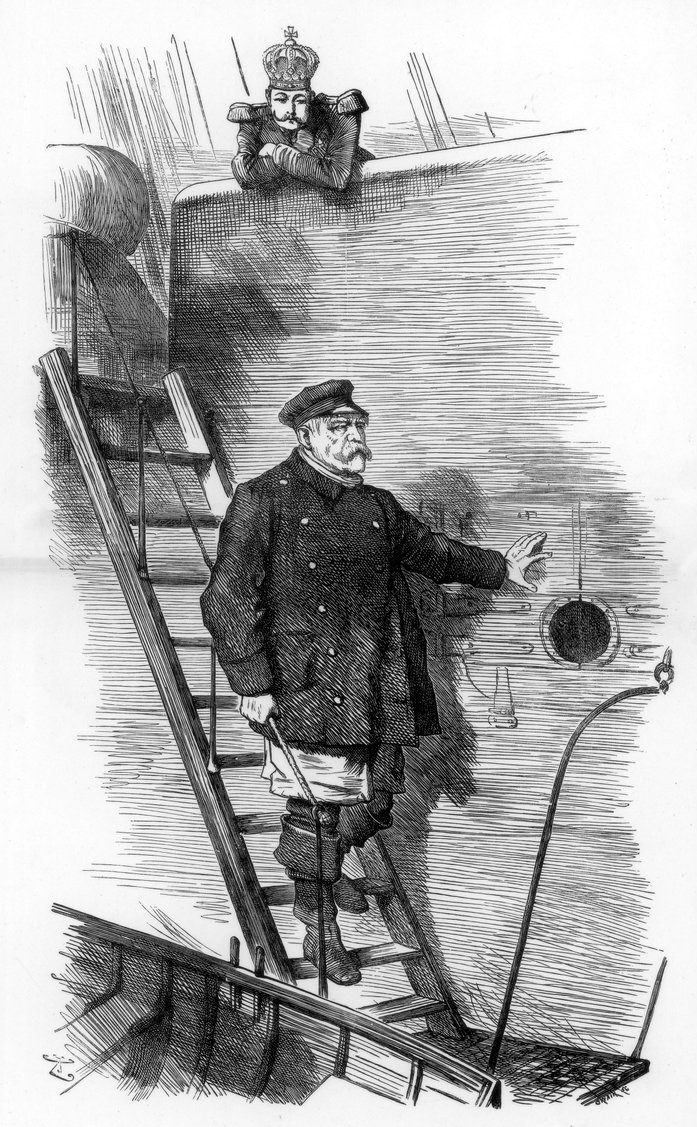
Dropping the Pilot; Punch, 29 March 1890

Although concerned by increasing German industrial and military strength post-1871, British politicians were reassured by Bismarck's efforts to maintain the status quo, one example being the 1890 Heligoland–Zanzibar Treaty. His dismissal by Wilhelm II in 1890 introduced greater uncertainty into international politics, at a time when Britain faced numerous foreign policy challenges.

The Near East and the Balkans were destabilised by the decline of the Ottoman Empire, and the expansionist ambitions of other European powers. In East Africa, Britain and France nearly came to blows in the 1898 Fashoda Incident; in Southern Africa, the Boer Republics had become increasingly restive. For domestic political reasons, President Cleveland manufactured a quarrel over Venezuela's border with British Guiana. Russian expansion in Central Asia during the 19th century had brought them to the edge of British India, while the two also competed in nominally independent Persia. In China and East Asia, British economic interests were threatened by powers such as Japan, Russia, and the United States.

The most pressing issue was Germany, caused by Wilhelm's determination to challenge the Royal Navy, which led to the naval arms race. A tendency to make aggressive statements was as much of a problem as his erratic foreign policy. It included securing 'compensation' for Germany in Africa, China and the Pacific, provision of military support for the Boers, and growing economic and military influence in the Ottoman Empire. Wilhelm's aim was to end "Britain's free ride on the coat-tails of the Triple Alliance."

== Abandonment ==
In 1898, the Colonial Secretary Joseph Chamberlain tried to negotiate an alliance with Germany. He spoke publicly of Britain's diplomatic predicament, saying "We have had no allies. I am afraid we have had no friends ... We stand alone." While unsuccessful, it reflected a growing realisation that Britain's diplomatic isolation during the 1899–1902 Second Boer War left it dangerously exposed.

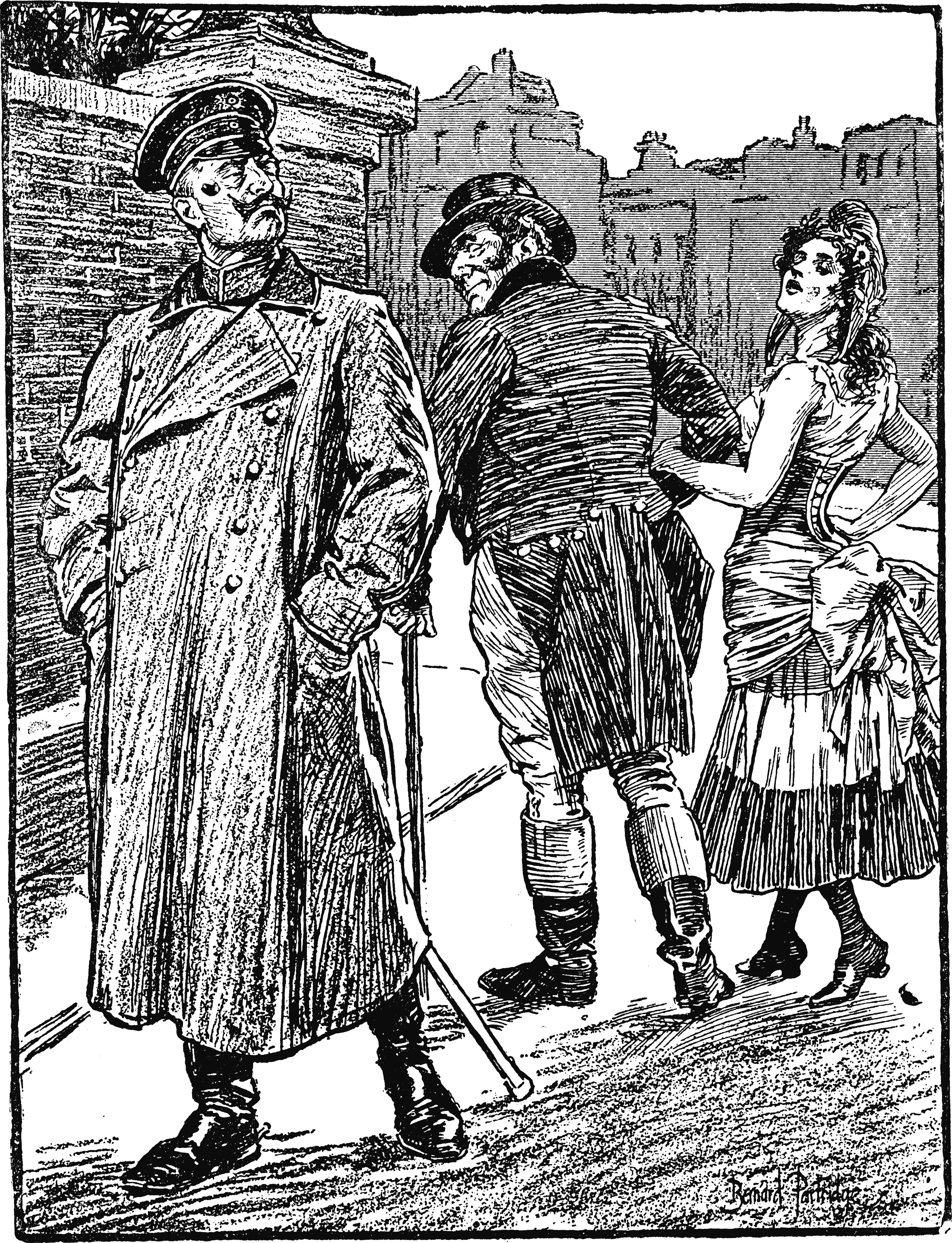
The Entente Cordiale; John Bull (Britain) walks off with Marianne (France), while the Kaiser pretends not to care.

According to G.W. Monger's summary of the Cabinet debates in 1900 to 1902:

Chamberlain advocated ending Britain's isolation by concluding an alliance with Germany; Salisbury resisted change. With the new crisis in China caused by the Boxer rising and Lansdowne's appointment to the Foreign Office in 1900, those who advocated a change won the upper hand. Lansdowne in turn attempted to reach an agreement with Germany and a settlement with Russia but failed. In the end Britain concluded an alliance with Japan. The decision of 1901 was momentous; British policy had been guided by events, but Lansdowne had no real understanding of these events. The change of policy had been forced on him and was a confession of Britain's weakness.

In 1902, Britain and Japan signed the Anglo-Japanese Alliance; if either were attacked by a third party, the other would remain neutral and if attacked by two or more opponents, the other would come to its aid. This meant Japan could rely on British support in a war with Russia, if either France or Germany, which also had interests in China, decided to join them. With Britain still engaged in the Boer War, this was arguably a defensive move rather than an end to isolation, a view supported by T. G. Otte, who sees it as reinforcing Britain's aloofness from the Continent and the European alliance systems.

The peaceful resolution of the Venezuela issue in 1897 led to the 1901 Hay–Pauncefote Treaty, but it dealt with the Panama Canal, Britain tacitly accepted US supremacy and responsibility for the Americas. Just as the Anglo-Japanese Alliance allowed the Royal Navy to reduce its presence in the Far East, that in the Caribbean was also significantly reduced as a result.

Primarily for domestic British consumption, the 1904 Entente Cordiale with France and the 1907 Anglo-Russian Convention were not formal alliances, and both focused on colonial boundaries in Asia and Africa. However, they cleared the way for co-operation in other areas, making British entry into any future conflict involving France or Russia a strong possibility; these interlocking bilateral agreements became known as the Triple Entente.

In the 1911 Agadir Crisis, Britain backed France against Germany. By 1914, the British army and navy were committed to support France in the event of war with Germany, but even in the government, few were aware of the true extent of these undertakings.

== Appraisal by historians ==
Diplomatic historian Margaret MacMillan argues that by 1897, Britain was indeed isolated, but far from being "splendid"; Britain had no real friends, and was engaged in disputes with the United States, France, Germany, and Russia.

Historians have debated whether British isolation was intentional, or dictated by contemporary events. A.J.P. Taylor claimed it existed only in a limited sense: "The British certainly ceased to concern themselves with the Balance of Power in Europe; they supposed that it was self-adjusting. But they maintained close connection with the continental Powers for the sake of affairs outside of Europe, particularly in the Near East." For John Charmley, splendid isolation was a fiction for the period prior to the Franco-Russian Alliance of 1894, and reluctantly pursued thereafter.

E. David Steele argues that although Salisbury once referred to splendid isolation, he "was being ironical at the expense of those who believed in the possibility." Another biographer claims the term "unfairly affixed itself to (his) foreign policy" and that Salisbury discouraged its use, considering it dangerous to be completely uninvolved with European affairs.

== See also ==
- History of the foreign relations of the United Kingdom
- Pax Britannica
