= Triple Entente =

Early 20th-century understandings between France, Russia, and Great Britain

- 1907–1917
- The Triple Entente (Green) and the Triple Alliance (brown) in 1914: United Kingdom; France; Russia
- Status: Informal military alliance
- Establishment: 1907
- History
  - Established: 1907
  - Dissolved: 1917
Preceded by
Franco-Russian Alliance
Entente Cordiale
Anglo-Russian entente of 1907
Succeeded by
Allies of World War I

The Triple Entente (Note: French: Triple-Entente; Russian: Антанта, romanized: Antanta or Тройственная Антанта, Troystvennaya Antanta) (from French entente [ɑ̃tɑ̃t] meaning "friendship, understanding, agreement") describes the informal mutual arrangement and understanding between the Russian Empire, the French Third Republic, and the United Kingdom of Great Britain and Ireland. It was built upon the Franco-Russian Alliance of 1894, the Entente Cordiale of 1904 between France and Britain, and the Anglo-Russian Entente of 1907. It formed a powerful counterweight to the Triple Alliance of the German Empire, the Austro-Hungarian Empire, and the Kingdom of Italy. The Triple Entente, unlike the Triple Alliance or the Franco-Russian Alliance itself, was not an alliance of mutual defence.

The Franco-Japanese Treaty of 1907 was a key part of building a coalition as France took the lead in creating alliances with Japan, Russia, and (informally) with Britain. Japan wanted to raise a loan in Paris, so France made the loan contingent on a Russo-Japanese agreement and a Japanese guarantee for France's strategically vulnerable possessions in Indochina. Britain encouraged the Russo-Japanese rapprochement. Thus was built the Triple Entente coalition that fought World War I.

The Triple Entente and Triple Alliance powers jointly convened the London Peace Conference to arbitrate territorial disputes among Balkan states and the Ottoman Empire.

At the start of World War I in 1914, all three Triple Entente members entered it as Allied Powers against the Central Powers: Germany, Austria-Hungary, the Ottoman Empire and Bulgaria. On 4 September 1914, the Triple Entente issued a declaration undertaking not to conclude a separate peace and only to demand terms of peace agreed among the three parties. Historians continue to debate the importance of the alliance system as one of the causes of World War I.

== Alliance system ==
During the Franco-Prussian War of 1870–71, Prussia and its allies defeated the Second French Empire, resulting in the establishment of the Third Republic. In the Treaty of Frankfurt, Prussia forced France to cede Alsace-Lorraine to the new German Empire, souring subsequent relations. France, worried about the escalating military development of Germany, began building up its own war industries and army to deter German aggression.

Russia had previously been a member of the League of the Three Emperors, an alliance in 1873 with Austria-Hungary and Germany. The alliance was part of German Chancellor Otto von Bismarck's plan to isolate France diplomatically; he feared that France's revanchist aspirations might lead it to attempt to regain its 1871 losses stemming from the Franco-Prussian War. The alliance also served to oppose such socialist movements as the First International, which the conservative rulers found unsettling. However, the League faced great difficulty with the growing tensions between Russia and Austria-Hungary, mainly over the Balkans, where the rise of nationalism and the continued decline of the Ottoman Empire made many former Ottoman provinces struggle for independence. To counter Russian and French interests in Europe, the Dual alliance between Germany and Austria-Hungary was concluded in October 1879 and with Italy in May 1882. The situation in the Balkans, especially in the wake of the 1885 Serbo-Bulgarian War and the 1878 Treaty of Berlin, which made Russia feel cheated of its gains made in the Russo-Turkish War of 1877/78, prevented the League from being renewed in 1887. In an attempt to stop Russia from allying with France, Bismarck signed the secret Reinsurance Treaty with Russia in 1887. This treaty assured that both parties would remain neutral if war broke out. The growing rapprochement between Russia and France and Bismarck's exclusion of Russia from the German financial market in 1887 prevented the treaty from being renewed in 1890, ending the alliance between Germany and Russia. After the forced resignation of Bismarck in 1890, the young Kaiser Wilhelm set out on his imperialist course of Weltpolitik ("world politics") to increase the empire's influence in and control over the world.

== Franco-Russian Alliance ==
Russia had by far the largest manpower reserves of all the six European powers, but it was also the most backward economically. Russia shared France's worries about Germany. Additionally, the Russians feared that the Ottomans, who had received assistance from the British under Admiral Limpus, et al., the French, and the Germans to reorganize and modernize the Ottoman armed forces, would come to control the Dardanelles, a vital trade artery that carried two-fifths of Russia's exports.

There was also Russia's recent rivalry with Austria-Hungary over the spheres of influence in the Balkans and after the Reinsurance Treaty was not renewed in 1890, Russian leaders grew alarmed at the country's diplomatic isolation and joined the Franco-Russian Alliance in 1894.

France developed a strong bond with Russia by ratifying the Franco-Russian Alliance, which was designed to create a strong counter to the Triple Alliance. France's main concerns were to protect against an attack from Germany and to regain Alsace-Lorraine.

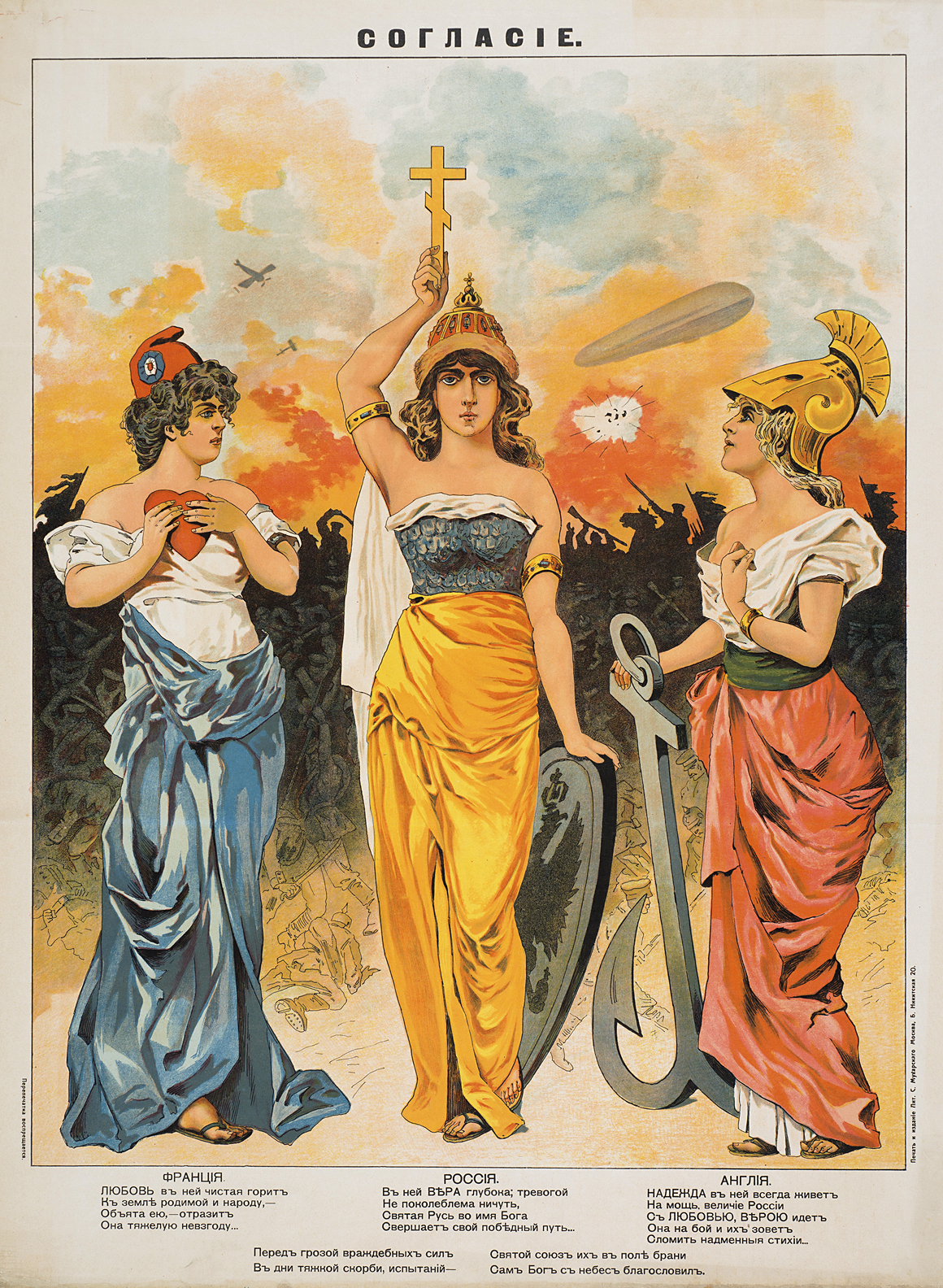
A 1914 Russian poster in which the upper inscription reads "agreement". The uncertain Britannia (right) and Marianne (left) look to the determined Mother Russia (centre) to lead them in the coming war.

== Entente cordiale ==
In the last decade of the nineteenth century, Britain continued its policy of "splendid isolation", with its primary focus on defending its massive overseas empire. However, by the early 1900s, the German threat had increased dramatically, and Britain thought it was in need of allies. London made overtures to Berlin which were not reciprocated, so London turned to Paris and St. Petersburg instead.

In 1904, Britain and France signed a series of agreements, the Entente cordiale, mostly aimed toward resolving colonial disputes. That heralded the end of British splendid isolation. France and Britain had signed five separate agreements regarding spheres of influence in North Africa in 1904, the Entente cordiale. The Tangier Crisis later encouraged co-operation between the two countries from their mutual fear of apparent German expansionism.

=== Naval race with Germany ===
Britain, traditionally having control of the seas, by 1909 saw the German navy as a serious threat to its Royal Navy. Britain was well ahead in terms of Dreadnought technology and responded with a major building program. They built a Royal Navy that Germany could never rival. The British sent war minister Lord Haldane to Berlin in February 1912 to reduce friction stemming from the Anglo-German naval arms race. The mission was a failure because the Germans attempted to link a "naval holiday" with a British promise to remain neutral if Germany should become engaged in a war where "Germany could not be said to be the aggressor." Zara Steiner says, "It would have meant abandoning the whole system of ententes which had been so carefully nurtured during the past six years. There was no German concession to counter the fear of German aggression." Essentially, the British reserved the right to join whatever country was attacking Germany even if Germany did not start the conflict, dooming the talks to failure. According to German historian Dirk Bönker, "To be sure, the [naval] race was decided early on; political leaders and diplomats learned to bracket it as an issue, and it did not cause the decision for war in 1914. But the naval competition nonetheless created an atmosphere of mutual hostility and distrust, which circumscribed the space for peaceful diplomacy and public recognition of shared interests, and helped to pave the twisted road to war in Europe."

=== Not an alliance ===
The Entente, unlike the Triple Alliance and the Franco-Russian Alliance, was not an alliance of mutual defense and so Britain was free to make its own foreign policy decisions in 1914. As British Foreign Office Official Eyre Crowe minuted, "The fundamental fact, of course, is that the Entente is not an alliance. For purposes of ultimate emergencies, it may be found to have no substance at all. For the Entente is nothing more than a frame of mind, a view of general policy which is shared by the governments of two countries, but which may be, or become, so vague as to lose all content". Britain's engagement marked a significant shift from its "splendid isolation" towards a strategic partnership, A move seen as both necessary and controversial at the time. While some contemporaries and historians have characterized this partnership as an "unholy alliance" due to its informal nature and former rivalries.

== Anglo-Russian Convention ==
Russia had also recently lost the humiliating Russo-Japanese War, a cause of the Russian Revolution of 1905, and the apparent transformation into a constitutional monarchy. Although it was perceived as useless during the war with Japan, the alliance was valuable in the European theatre to counteract the threat of the Triple Alliance. Tomaszewski describes the evolution of the triple entente relationship from the Russian standpoint during the period 1908 to 1914 as a progression from a shaky set of understandings that withstood various crises and emerged as a fully-fledged alliance after the outbreak of World War I.

In 1907, the Anglo-Russian Entente was agreed, which attempted to resolve a series of long-running disputes over Persia, Afghanistan and Tibet and end their rivalry in Central Asia, nicknamed The Great Game. and helped to address British fears about the Baghdad Railway, which would help German expansion in the Near East.

== Entente in operation ==
The coming into being of the entente did not necessarily fix a permanent division into two opposing power blocs. The situation remained flexible. The alignment of the Russian Empire with Europe's two largest power centres was controversial on both sides. Many Russian conservatives distrusted the secular French and recalled British past diplomatic manoeuvres to block Russian influence in the Near East. In turn, prominent French and British journalists, academics, and parliamentarians found the reactionary tsarist regime distasteful. Mistrust persisted even during wartime, with British and French politicians expressing relief when Tsar Nicholas II abdicated and was replaced by the Russian Provisional Government after the February Revolution in 1917. An offer of political asylum for the Romanovs was even withdrawn by the British king for fear of popular reaction. Also, France never brought up the subject of asylum with the deposed tsar.

== See also ==
- Causes of World War I
  - British entry into World War I
  - French entry into World War I
  - Russian entry into World War I
- Historiography of the causes of World War I
- International relations of the Great Powers (1814–1919)
- Little Entente
