= Anglo-German naval arms race =

Early 20th-century arms race between the United Kingdom and Germany

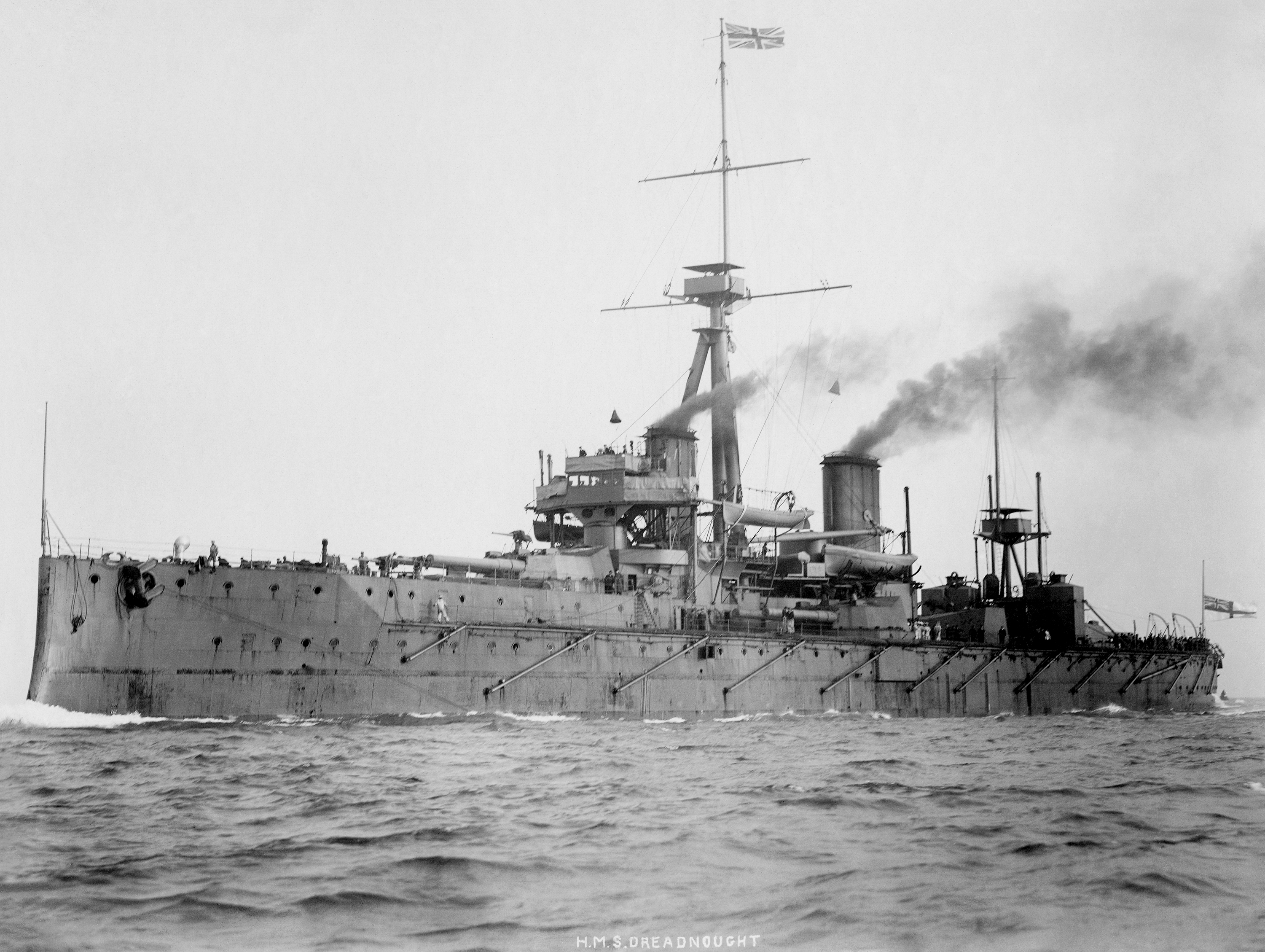
HMS Dreadnought

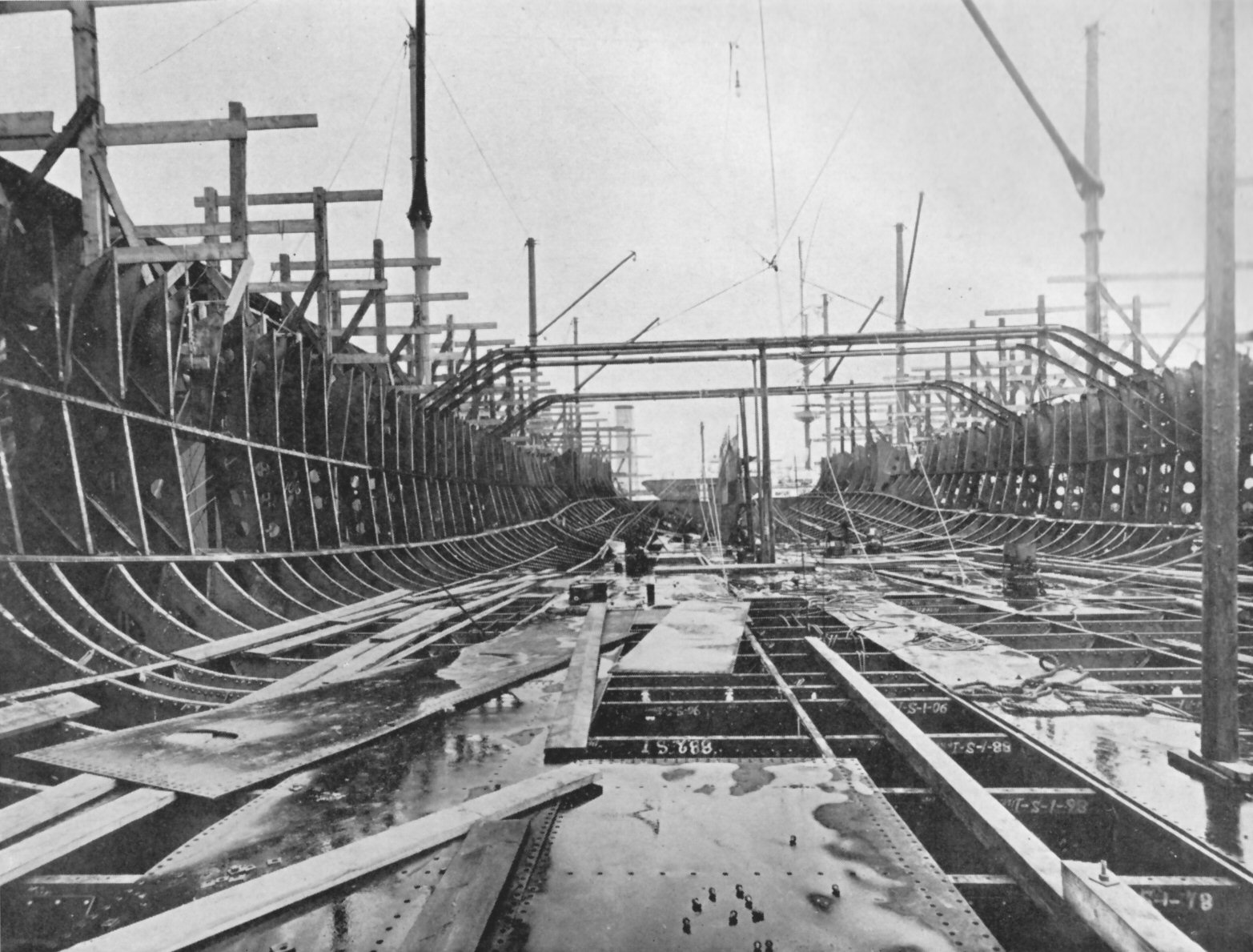
HMS Dreadnought under construction

The arms race between Great Britain and Germany that occurred from the last decade of the nineteenth century until the advent of World War I in 1914 was one of the intertwined causes of that conflict. While based in a bilateral relationship that had worsened over many decades, the arms race began with a plan by German Admiral Alfred von Tirpitz in 1897 to create a fleet in being to force Britain to make diplomatic concessions; Tirpitz did not expect the Imperial German Navy to defeat the Royal Navy.

With the support of the Kaiser Wilhelm II, Tirpitz began advancing a series of laws to construct an increasing number of large surface warships. The construction of HMS Dreadnought in 1906 prompted Tirpitz to further increase the rate of naval construction. While some British observers were uneasy at German naval expansion, alarm was not general until Germany's naval bill of 1908. The British public and political opposition demanded that the Liberal government meet the German challenge, resulting in the funding of additional dreadnoughts in 1910 and escalating the arms race.

Maintaining Europe's largest army and second-largest navy took an enormous toll on Germany's finances. Theobald von Bethmann Hollweg, German chancellor from 1909, undertook a policy of détente with Britain to alleviate the fiscal strain and focus on the rivalry with France. Under Bethmann Hollweg, and particularly from 1912 onwards, Germany abandoned the dreadnought arms race and focused on a commerce raiding naval strategy to be conducted with submarines.

One of the ironies of the arms race and subsequent conflict was that, while the German battle fleet fought only one major surface engagement (the inconclusive Battle of Jutland) and never seriously threatened British naval supremacy, the commerce raiding strategy that had been the historic focus of German naval doctrine would consistently endanger British merchant shipping and imports throughout the war. The success of German submarine warfare during World War I had great influence on German Naval policy in the lead up to the Second World War, with the utilisation of both U-boats and fast, well armoured battlecruisers for commerce raiding being the primary task of the Kriegsmarine.

== Background ==
Britain had the largest navy in the world and its policy was to ensure the Royal Navy was at least the size of the next two largest navies combined, known as the two-power standard. Britain's economy was dependent on the ability to ship in raw materials and export out a finished product. By 1900, 58% of calories consumed by Britain's population came from overseas, meaning that an inability to guarantee free movement on the seas would result in food shortages. Even before the German naval challenge, British political and military leaders mused about catastrophic economic, social, and political consequences if the Royal Navy could not guarantee British freedom of action. Worry about Britain's ability to defend itself became the focus of the invasion literature genre, which began in 1871, remained popular to World War I, and was highly influential on public opinion.

The North Sea

The first Chancellor of united Germany Otto von Bismarck had skillfully guided Germany's foreign relations so it was not firmly attached to any other European power. After his departure in 1890, Germany's foreign policy drifted into deeper commitment with the Triple Alliance of Austria-Hungary and Italy. Friedrich von Holstein of the German Foreign Office convinced the new Chancellor, Leo von Caprivi, to not renew the Reinsurance Treaty with the Russian Empire in 1890. Bismarck had designed the Reinsurance Treaty to keep Russia from an alliance with France; the Russian search for allies who could finance their enormous debts resulted in the Franco-Russian Alliance several years later. Holstein had hoped that the lapsing of the Reinsurance Treaty would result in a closer relationship with Britain, which was competing with both Russia and France, which did not occur. From 1890 to 1897, Germany wavered between pro-British and pro-Russian policies, reflecting the incoherence of German leadership.

In 1890, Alfred Thayer Mahan, an American naval officer and historian, published The Influence of Sea Power upon History, widely considered the most important work in modern naval strategy. Mahan argued that sea power was the deciding factor that allowed strong nations to thrive and impose their will on weaker nations, and that the proper way to achieve naval supremacy was large-scale battles between fleets. At the time, the Imperial German Navy subscribed to the commerce raiding theory of navy strategy, but Mahan's arguments had enormous influence over subsequent German and British thinking.

Translated into German by Admiral Ludwig Borckenhagen, who supported Mahan's ideas, a copy of the book was placed in every German naval vessel. Kaiser Wilhelm II immediately subscribed to Mahan's ideas after reading his book in 1894 and sought Reichstag funding to implement them.

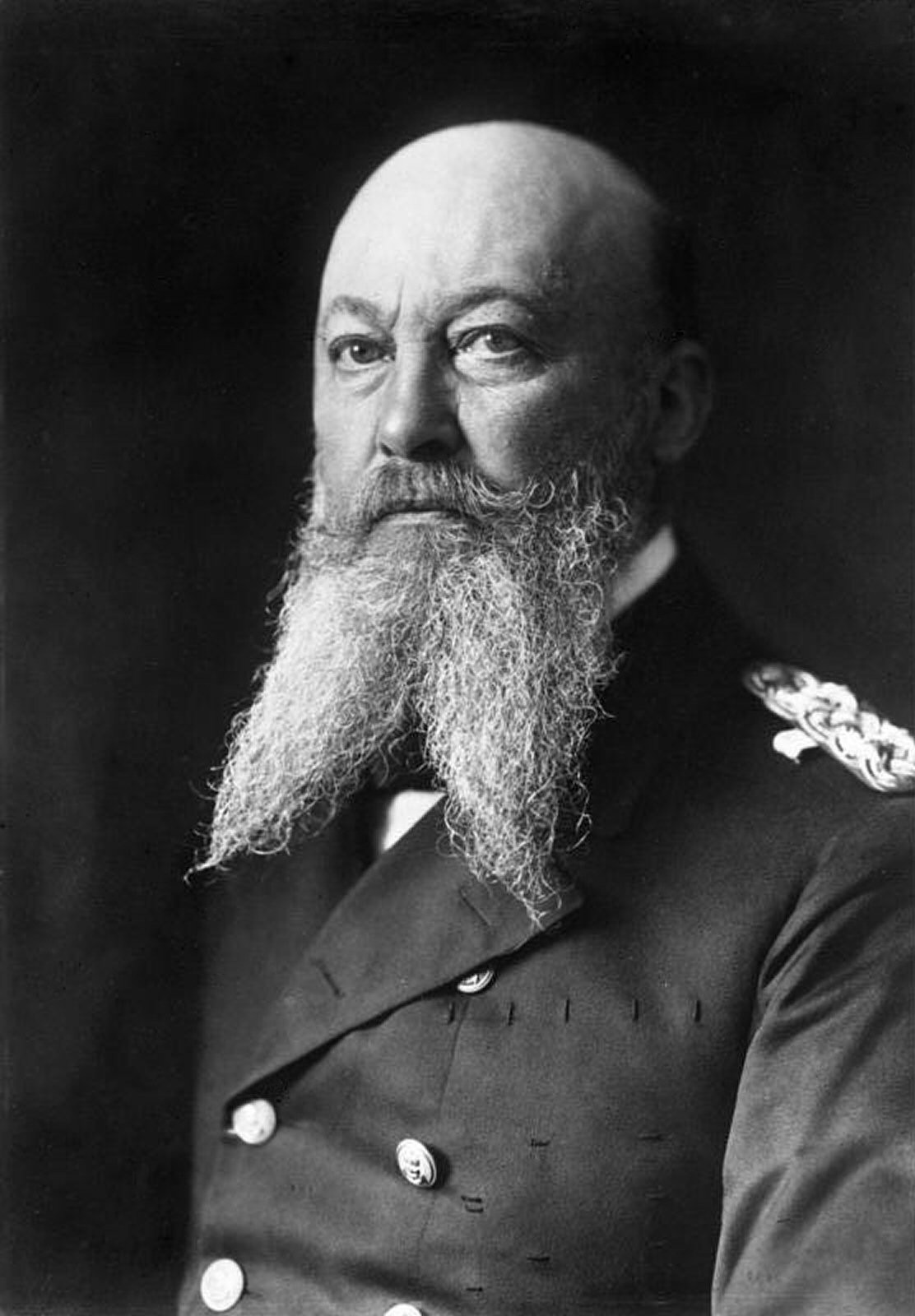
German Admiral Alfred von Tirpitz was the primary architect of the strategy of creating a "fleet in being" to force concessions from Britain after 1897.

The Reichstag funded four of the thirty-six cruisers that Wilhelm requested in 1895, and none at all the following two years. Frustrated at being rebuffed, Wilhelm recalled von Tirpitz from his duties in the Far East to be the Secretary of State of the German Imperial Naval Office in 1897. Tirpitz was a follower of anti-British nationalist Heinrich von Treitschke as well as Mahan's ideas on the primacy of battle fleets. In 1894, he wrote a famous memorandum section titled, The Natural Purpose of a Fleet is the Strategic Offensive, dismissing commerce raiding and coastal defense, and arguing that Germany must prepare for offensive sea battle to ensure its place in the world.

In his first meeting with Wilhelm in June 1897, Tirpitz stated his case that Germany must confront Britain to ensure its place as a European power. He also outlined a strategy that he would follow for many years: build a German navy strong enough that the effort to destroy it would open Britain to attack from Britain's French and Russian rivals, which is a form of Mahan's "fleet in being". Tirpitz calculated that since the British navy was scattered to protect its possessions around the globe, "it comes to a battleship war between Heligoland and the Thames." Both Tirpitz and Bernhard von Bülow, who was Secretary of State of Foreign Affairs from 1897 to 1900 and then Chancellor until 1909, calculated that once Germany possessed a navy that Britain could not destroy without imperiling itself, Britain would be forced to negotiate with Germany as an equal and perhaps even give up its "splendid isolation" to join the Triple Alliance. Although Britain maintained formal independence from the Triple Alliance, it entered into informal understandings with Italy and Austria-Hungary in the 1887 Mediterranean protocol. These were strategic discussions rather than binding treaties, aimed to check Russian influence and secure access for the Royal Navy.

== The German Fleet Acts (1898–1912) ==
In accord with Wilhelm II's enthusiasm for an expanded German navy and the strategic vision of Tirpitz, five Fleet Acts in 1898, 1900, 1906, 1908, and 1912 greatly expanded the German High Seas Fleet. The German aim was to build a fleet that would be two thirds the size of the British navy.

The First Naval Act passed in March 1898 after an extensive lobbying and public relations campaign led by Wilhelm, Tirpitz, and Bülow. The act funded the building of eleven battleships in the next seven years. Britain had little concern about the First Naval Act as it did not increase Germany's navy to a size relevant to the two-power standard. However, by November 1898, Tirpitz had begun work on a plan to double the fleet to include forty-five battleships and armored cruisers, which he presented to the Kaiser in September 1899. The timing was fortunate, as the eruption of the Second Boer War and British seizure of a German steamer off southern Africa enraged the German public against Britain; the Reichstag passed the Second Navy Law in June 1900.

=== HMS Dreadnought ===
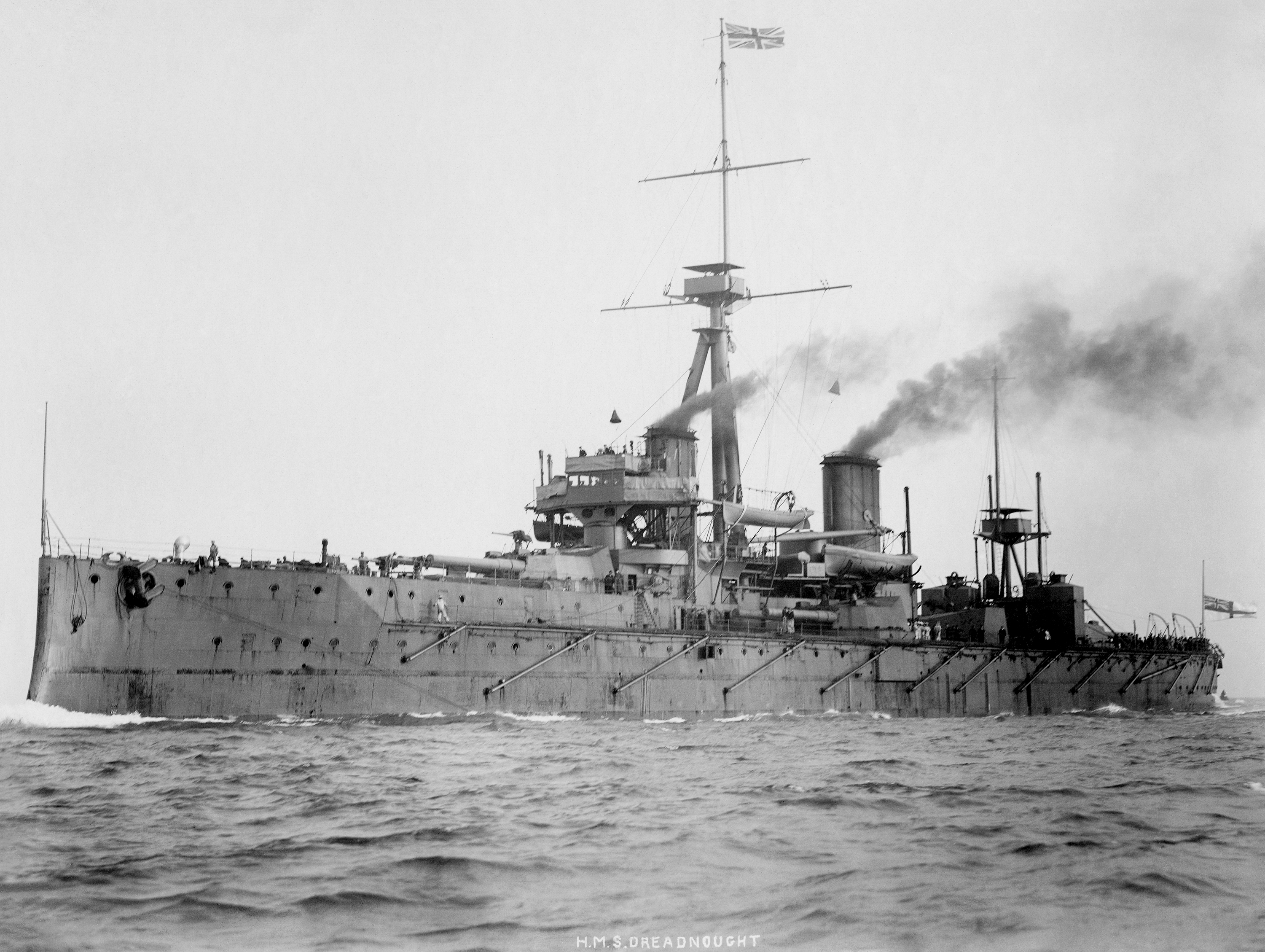
HMS Dreadnought had the fighting capability of two or three normal battleships.

The passage of the Second Naval Act in Germany increased worry among British policymakers. In 1902, First Lord of the Admiralty William Palmer, 2nd Earl of Selborne, Tirpitz's British counterpart, told his fellow Cabinet members that the German navy was being built with an eye for war with Britain. Admiral Jacky Fisher was appointed First Sea Lord (professional head of the Royal Navy) in 1904, and massively reorganized the Royal Navy by bringing most of Britain's navy force close to the home isles. He also set up a committee to design a new super battleship, which especially in the wake of the May 1905 Battle of Tsushima seemed to be the future of naval warfare. HMS Dreadnought was launched in February 1906, just 14 months after being approved. Jane's Fighting Ships, an annual reference book on naval warships, noted that HMS Dreadnought was equivalent to two or three normal battleships.

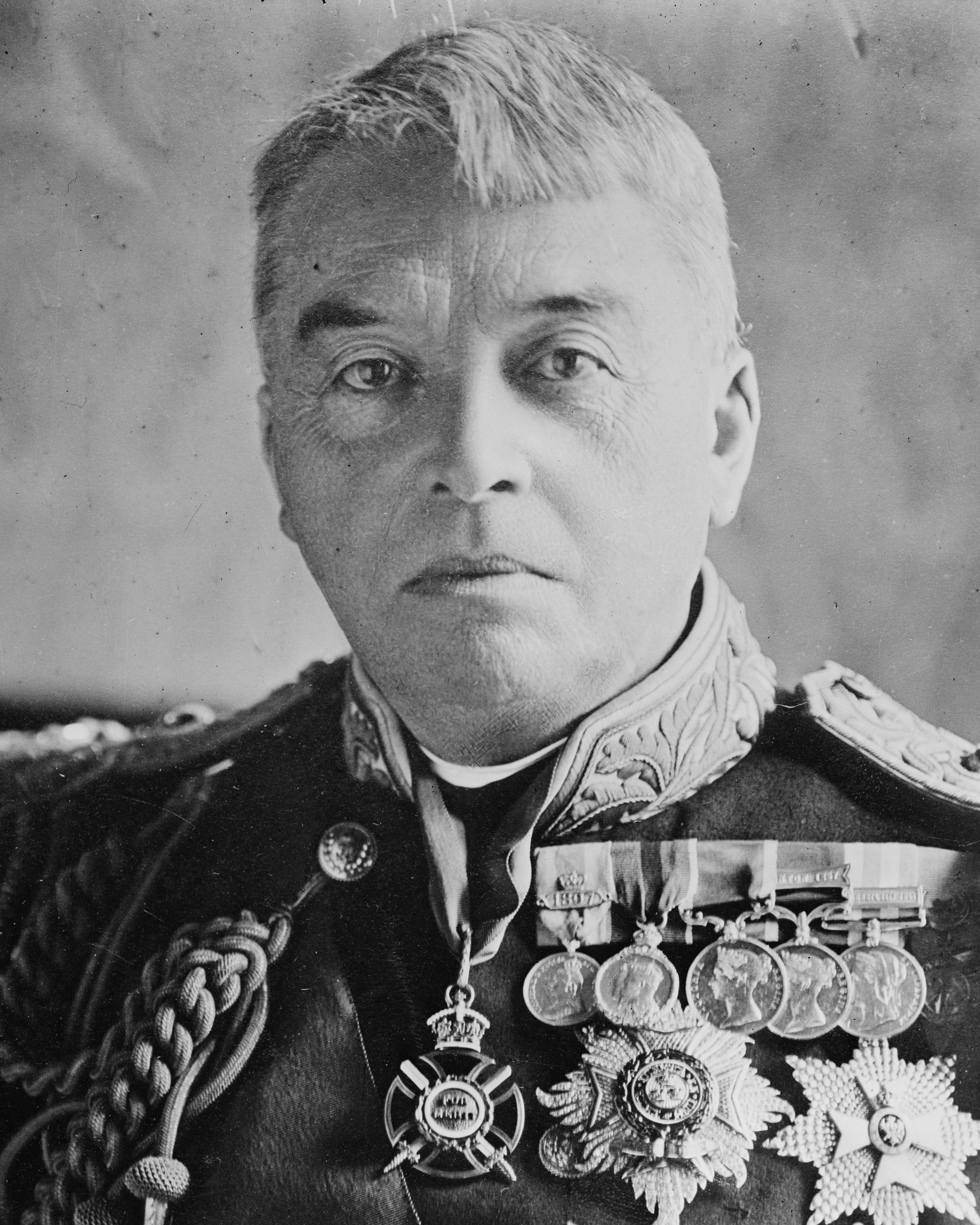
Jacky Fisher, First Sea Lord from 1904 to 1910, guided the design process for the dreadnought-style of battleship and reorganized the Royal Navy to protect the home isles.

In the beginning of 1905, the German naval attaché in Britain reported to Tirpitz that the British were planning a new class of battleship. That summer, Tirpitz consulted with his advisers; by autumn, he had decided that Germany would match the British naval building plan. Scholars highlight that Imperial German decision-making was so incoherent that Tirpitz could make this decision without consulting the Chancellor, foreign ministry, treasury, the naval strategic planning offices, or the two other naval offices: the Naval High Command and Naval Cabinet. He presented his new supplementary naval bill to the Reichstag, envisioning a 35% increase in spending over the Second Naval Act to build two dreadnoughts and one armored cruiser per year. The bill encountered fierce opposition from across the political spectrum because of the growing government budget balance and resistance by the Reichstag to raising taxes. Fortunately for the bill, the Algeciras Conference that concluded in April 1906 after the First Moroccan Crisis inflamed German nationalist sentiment against Britain and France and the third naval law passed easily in May 1906.

Wilhelm and Tirpitz, among other German leaders, viewed British actions as working in concert with France and Russia to encircle Germany. Tirpitz believed that the British knew that they had made a mistake in building the expensive dreadnoughts and armored cruisers, and that they would realize their folly if Germany did not flinch in following them. German leaders had also become increasingly nervous about a 'Kopenhagen', a British strike to disable their fleet like that conducted in the 1807 Battle of Copenhagen. In December 1904, during the heightened tensions of the Russo-Japanese War, rumours spread that Japan's ally Britain would attack and the German ambassador to Britain, who was in Berlin, had to reassure Wilhelm and other senior officials that Britain did not intend to start a war. As fears rose, so did nationalist sentiment, including right-wing criticism of the leftist Social Democratic Party, who resisted higher defence spending and encouraged peaceful foreign relations.

From 1905 onward, Admiral Fisher developed war plans for blockading the German coast; it became a central British strategy and was implemented in 1914. In 1906, Fisher declared that Germany was the "only probable enemy" and that the Royal Navy should keep a force twice as powerful as Germany's navy within a few hours of Germany's shores. Eyre Crowe of the British Foreign Office wrote a memorandum on 1 January 1907 to Foreign Secretary Sir Edward Grey that became policy. In it, Crowe urged stalwart resistance to what he viewed as Germany's attempts at hegemony in Europe. He argued that German actions might be the result of a confused strategy, but that the intent was irrelevant to British national security.

=== Fourth bill (1908) ===
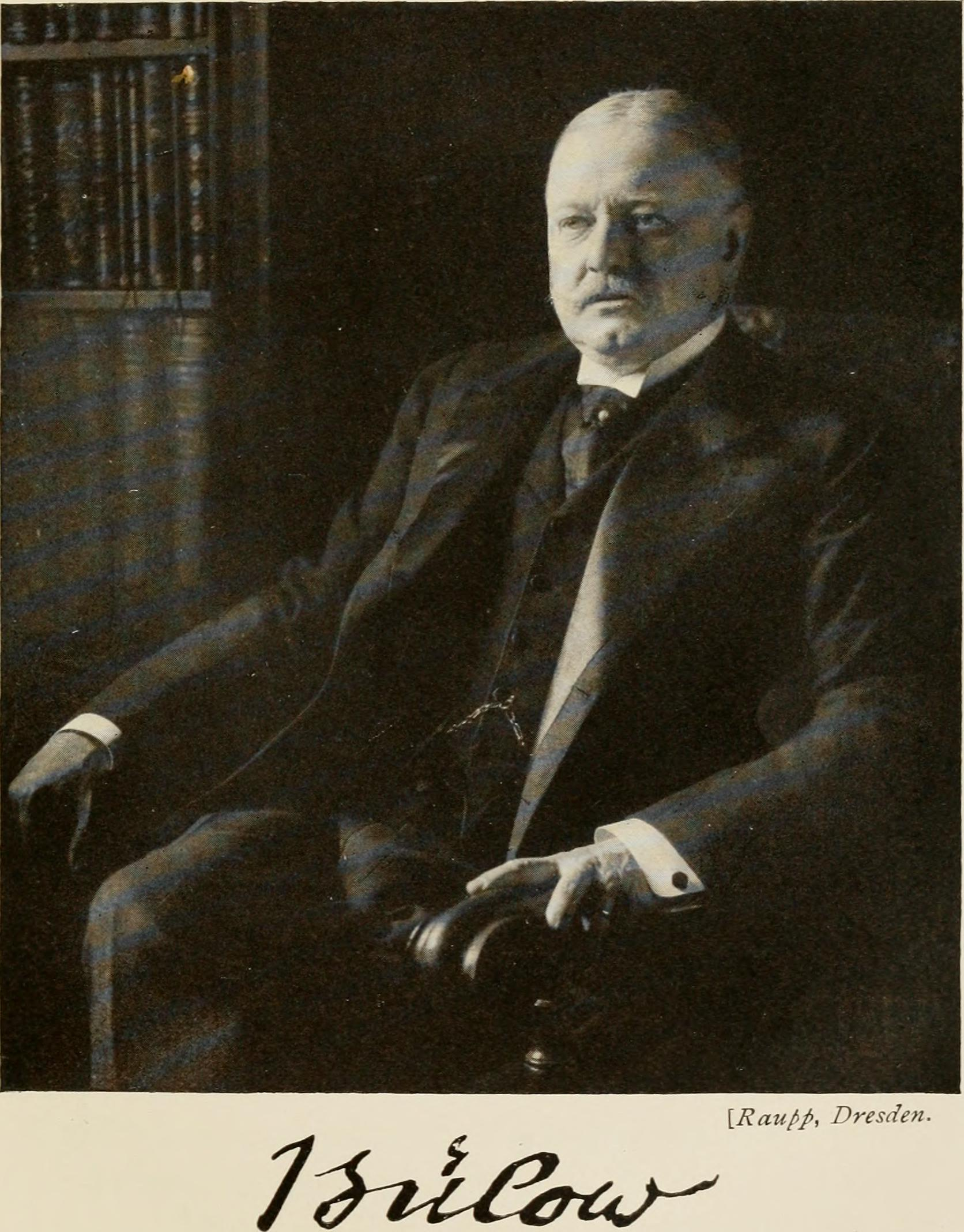
Bernhard von Bülow, German Chancellor from 1900 to 1909, initially supported Tirpitz's plan but grew increasingly skeptical of the strain upon German finances.

In March 1908, Tirpitz got a fourth naval bill – the second supplementary bill – passed by the Reichstag. It increased the rate of new battleships from three to four per year for the next four years, before stabilizing at three per year. If implemented, Germany would have had 21 dreadnoughts in 1914. Tirpitz continued to assume that Britain would not be alarmed by the German naval buildup and assured Kaiser Wilhelm of the supplementary bill that "internationally and domestically it looks as small and harmless as possible."

The heightened tensions around the Bosnian crisis led Chancellor Bülow, who was responsible for finding the money to fund the military, to question the value of Tirpitz's strategy, which was costly and appeared to increase Germany's diplomatic isolation. Germany's national debt had doubled between 1900 and 1908 and most of the national budget went to the military. Bülow was coming to the conclusion that Germany could not afford both the largest army and second-largest navy in Europe. Though the German ambassador in London, Paul Metternich, reported that the naval buildup was alienating Britain from Germany, Tirpitz stated that the conflict with Germany was based in economic rivalry, not competing navies. Tirpitz also argued that Germany had invested too much money into the naval program to halt it and that the domestic political coalition that had been created to support the naval buildup would react unpredictably if the government left the arms race. Facing an ever-expanding budget deficit, but lacking the confidence of the Kaiser and unable to raise taxes in the face of Reichstag opposition, Bülow resigned in July 1909.

=== British reaction ===
Up to Germany's 1908 naval bill, Britain in general had largely ignored the buildup, though some individuals in the military and government were already keenly aware of the potential threat. In December 1907, the Admiralty had in fact proposed reducing the rate of battleship construction to one dreadnought and one armored cruiser the following year, which was in line with the Liberal government's priorities to increase spending on social programs and reduce overall government spending, under the new leadership of Prime Minister H. H. Asquith in May 1908. However, in the summer following the 1908 bill, alarm among the public and in the government rose.

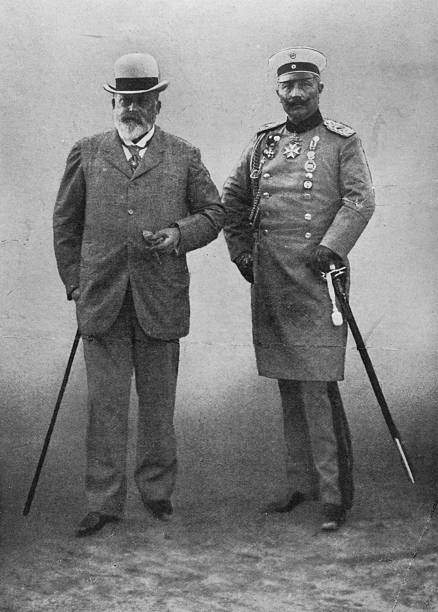
King Edward VII and Kaiser Wilhelm II in Berlin, c. 1908

In August 1908, King Edward VII visited his nephew Wilhelm in Kronberg. He had been provided with a paper outlining British concerns but decided not to raise the issue of naval spending, as it might spoil the congenial mood. Wilhelm cheerfully commented to Permanent Under-Secretary of State for Foreign Affairs Charles Hardinge that he thought relations between Germany and Britain were quite good. Hardinge politely disagreed, stating that British concern at the German naval buildup would likely result in the Liberal government asking Parliament to expand British naval shipbuilding, resulting in a naval rivalry that would greatly increase tensions between the two countries. Wilhelm sharply replied that there was no reason for British concern, and that the German naval bill did not threaten the relative strengths of the two navies. No resolution was reached, and Wilhelm left the Kronberg meeting believing that he had convinced the British of the justness of Germany's position.

A series of incidents escalated British tension. In autumn 1908, the British naval attaché in Berlin reported that Germany was building an extra battleship; in reality, ship builder Schichau-Werke had asked the government for an early contract to build a ship scheduled for 1909 to avoid laying off workers in Danzig (now: Gdańsk, Poland). Then on 28 October, The Daily Telegraph published what was described as an interview with the Kaiser. The Telegraph sent the piece to Wilhelm for approval, who in turn passed it to Chancellor Bülow, who passed it on to the Foreign Ministry for their review, which apparently did not take place. In the published piece, Wilhelm appeared, in the words of historian Margaret MacMillan, both "self-pitying and accusatory", stating that the British "are mad, mad, mad as March hares" because they did not, as he opined, realize that Germany is their good friend and that the naval buildup was not directed against them, but Japan. The Daily Telegraph Affair was variously seen in Britain as evidence that Wilhelm was mentally unbalanced or that it was part of a sinister plan to sway British public opinion. German leaders were appalled that their leader would make such a public fool of himself, nationalists and conservatives were infuriated by Wilhelm's declarations of friendship with Britain, and leftists were convinced that the Reichstag needed more control over the Kaiser. Wilhelm and the throne were severely weakened, and the Kaiser fell into a dark depression. Wilhelm never forgave Bülow for allowing the publication, which was a contributing factor in the Chancellor's departure in July 1909.

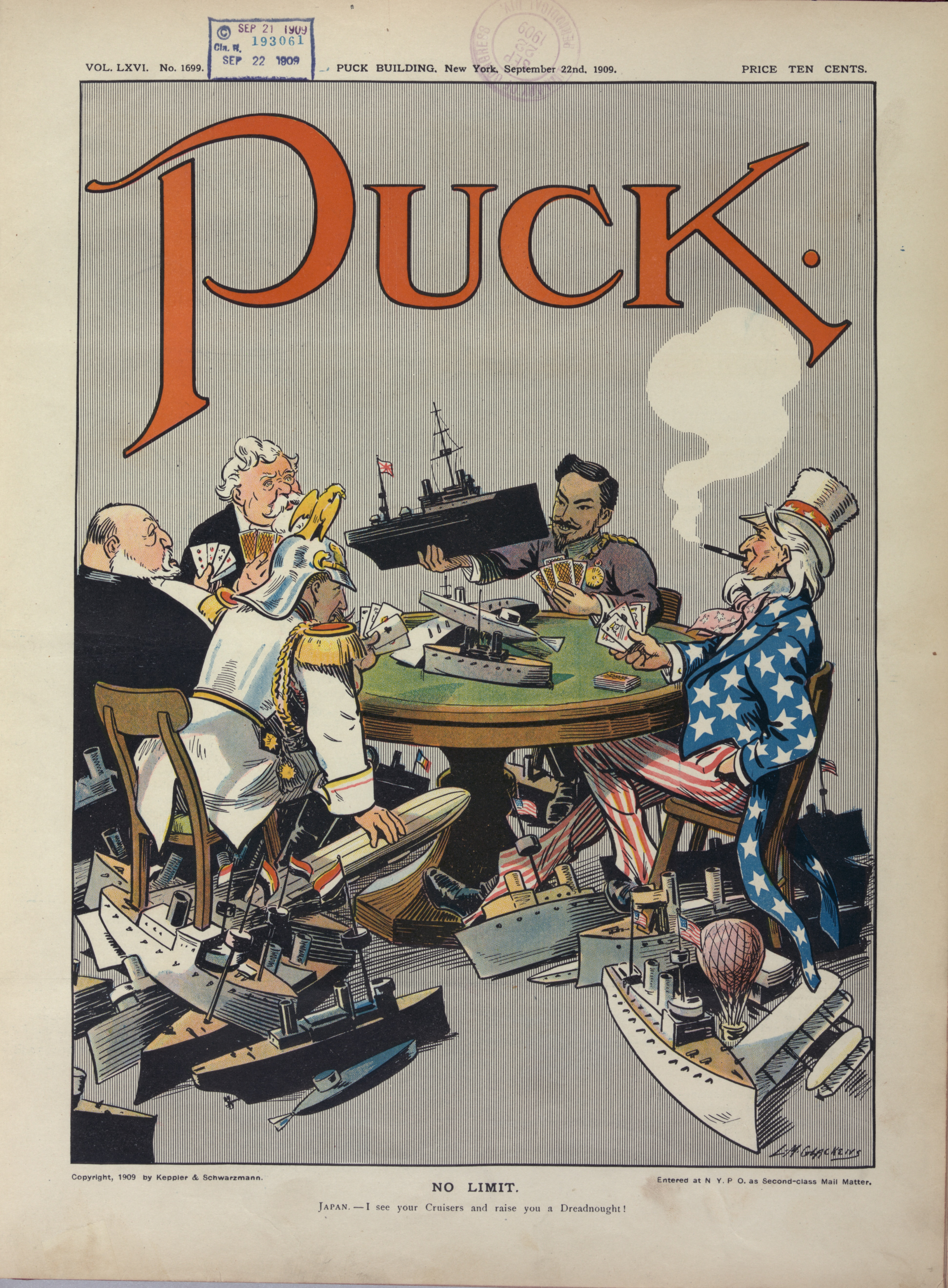
1909 cartoon in Puck shows five nations engaged in naval race; the Kaiser is in white.

After the German bill, the Admiralty abandoned its plan for reduced construction and, in December 1908, proposed building at least six more dreadnoughts. Opposition in the Cabinet revolved around the cost, led by Chancellor of the Exchequer David Lloyd George and President of the Board of Trade Winston Churchill, who both saw the military expenditures as threats to the welfare reforms promised by the Liberal Party. Lloyd George warned Prime Minister Asquith that Liberal MPs would revolt at a proposal adding an estimated £38 million in naval expenditures to the budget. However, the Conservative opposition, the Navy League, and British arms industry advocated for the spending. In popular sentiment, they were joined by King Edward VII, who supported eight more dreadnoughts. A Conservative MP coined what would become a popular slogan: We want eight and we won't wait!

In response to the broad support for increased naval strength, Asquith arranged a compromise in February 1909 to start four dreadnoughts in the next financial year, with an additional four more by spring 1910 if they were needed. With the Liberals in support, the government defeated a motion of no confidence brought by the Conservatives. Lloyd George included the additional dreadnoughts in his proposed "People's Budget" at the end of April 1909, which was rejected in November 1909 by the House of Lords, who were outraged by the measures to redistribute wealth. Asquith dissolved Parliament to hold an election in January 1910; his government lost its majority but remained in office with the support of the Irish Parliamentary Party. In the wake of the election, the House of Lords dropped its opposition to the People's Budget, including funding for the dreadnoughts, which passed in April 1910 and was a significant escalation of the arms race.

=== Arms race ends (1912–1914) ===
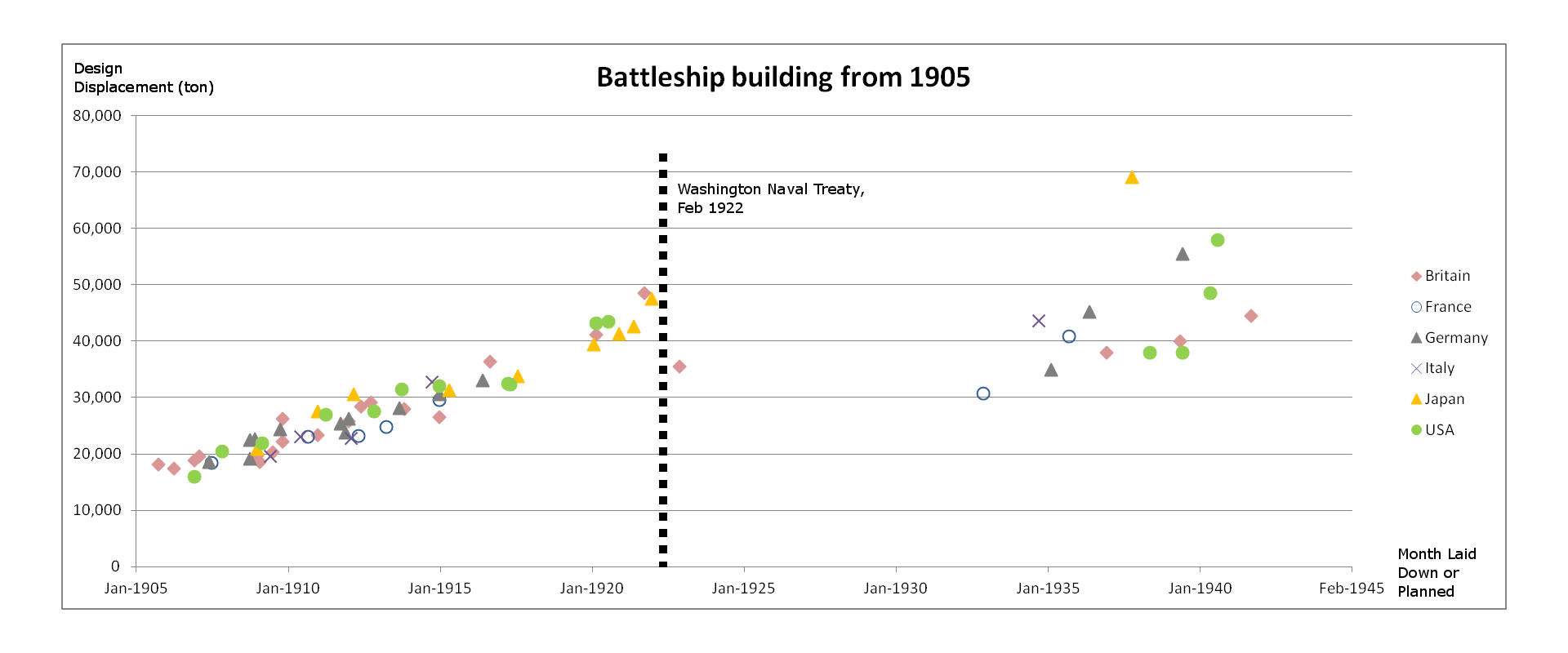
The size and power of battleships grew rapidly before, during, and after World War I: a result of competitive shipbuilding among a number of naval powers, including Britain and Germany, brought to an end by the Washington Naval Treaty and Treaty of Versailles

In 1912, German Chancellor Theobald von Bethmann Hollweg tried to end the naval arms race. His aim was to secure an understanding with the British to end the increasingly isolated position of Germany. Russian military expansion compelled the Germans to prioritise spending on their army and therefore less on the navy, a policy known as the Rüstungswende or ‘armaments turning point'. The initiative led to the Haldane Mission in which Germany offered to accept British naval superiority in exchange for British neutrality in a war in which Germany could not be said to be the aggressor. The proposal was rejected, as Britain felt that it had nothing to gain by such a treaty since its naval superiority was secure, but the British Foreign Secretary Sir Edward Grey favoured a more assertive policy against Germany.

By 1913, there was intense internal debate in Britain about new ships because of the growing influence of Fisher's ideas and increasing financial constraints. It is now generally accepted by historians that in the first half of 1914, the Germans adopted a policy of building submarines instead of new dreadnoughts and destroyers, effectively abandoning the arms race, but since they kept the new policy secret, other powers would be delayed in following suit. By the start of the First World War, Britain had 20 commissioned dreadnoughts and 9 battlecruisers, compared with Germany's 15 commissioned dreadnoughts and 7 battlecruisers.

The naval strength of the powers in 1914
| Country | Personnel | Large naval vessels (dreadnoughts) | Tonnage |
|---|---|---|---|
| Russia | 54,000 | 4 | 328,000 |
| France | 68,000 | 10 | 731,000 |
| Britain | 209,000 | 29 | 2,205,000 |
| Total | 331,000 | 43 | 3,264,000 |
| Germany | 79,000 | 17 | 1,019,000 |
| Austria-Hungary | 16,000 | 3* | 249,000 |
| Total | 95,000 | 20 | 1,268,000 |
| Grand total | 426,000 | 63 | 4,532,000 |
*4th not commissioned yet.

== See also ==
- Argentine–Chilean naval arms race
- Austro-Italian ironclad arms race
- Anglo-German Declarations about the Western Pacific Ocean
- Causes of World War I
- Navy League (Germany)
- Anglo-German Friendship Committee
- Pact of Cartagena
- Dogger Bank incident
- Venezuelan Debt Crisis
- South American dreadnought race
- International relations of the Great Powers (1814–1919)
