= Mediterranean Agreements (1887) =

1887 treaties between Britain and Mediterranean nations

The Mediterranean Agreements (German: Mittelmeerentente; French: Entente de la Méditerranée) were a series of treaties signed in 1887 by the United Kingdom of Great Britain and Ireland with Italy on 12 February (through the mediation of Germany), with Austria-Hungary on 24 March and with Spain on 4 May. Further notes were exchanged between Britain, Italy and Austria-Hungary on 12 December.

On the face of it the treaties recognised the status quo in the Mediterranean Sea. In fact, one of the objectives was to halt the expansion of the Russian Empire in the Balkans and her wish to control the straits of the Bosphorus and Dardanelles. From that perspective it also assured the survival of the Ottoman Empire. It also protected Italian interests against France. Thus it united forces hostile to Russia in the Balkans and to France in North Africa.

From the point of view of the German chancellor Otto von Bismarck, the benefit of these agreements to which Germany was not a party, was in bringing Britain closer to the Triple Alliance of Germany, Italy and Austria-Hungary.

The treaty potentially conflicted with the Reinsurance Treaty of 1887, between Germany and Russia. In the secret protocol to the Reinsurance Treaty, Bismarck lent support to Russia's expansion efforts. Thus the Mediterranean Agreement, while not a de jure contradiction of the Reinsurance Treaty was at least contrary to its spirit.

== Second Mediterranean Agreements ==
Between 1895 and 1897, European diplomacy in the Mediterranean region was dominated by the interplay between great powers. The period followed the original Mediterranean Agreements, in which Britain, Austria-Hungary, and Italy sought to maintain the status quo in the Eastern Mediterranean and the Balkans, primarily to counter French and Russian ambitions. These meeting Count Gołuchowski, Lord Salisbury and unknowingly Italian representatives at negotiations table acted as a quasi-tripartite consultation linking Austria-Hungary, Italy, and Britain, though they were not formalized into a full treaty formally alliance. After the pacts abandoned, Gołuchowski’s diplomacy achieved a tenuous 1897 Austro-Russian détente, understanding over non-interference in the Balkans, while carefully avoiding alienating Italy.

== Bibliography ==
- W. N. Medlicott. The Mediterranean Agreements 1887. The Slavonic Review Vol. 5, No. 13 (Jun., 1926), pp. 66-88
- Pribram, Alfred, ed. (1921) The Secret Treaties of Austria-Hungary. Vol. 2. Cambridge, MA: Harvard University Press. pp. 47-57, 71-78 (Text of Agreements)
- Gregor Schöllgen, Imperialismus und Gleichgewicht. Deutschland, England und die orientalische Frage 1871–1914, Munich, Oldenbourg, 2000 (ISBN 3-486-52003-2), p. 23
- Die Grosse Politik der Europäischen Kabinette
