= Reinsurance Treaty =

Late 19th-century German-Russian agreement

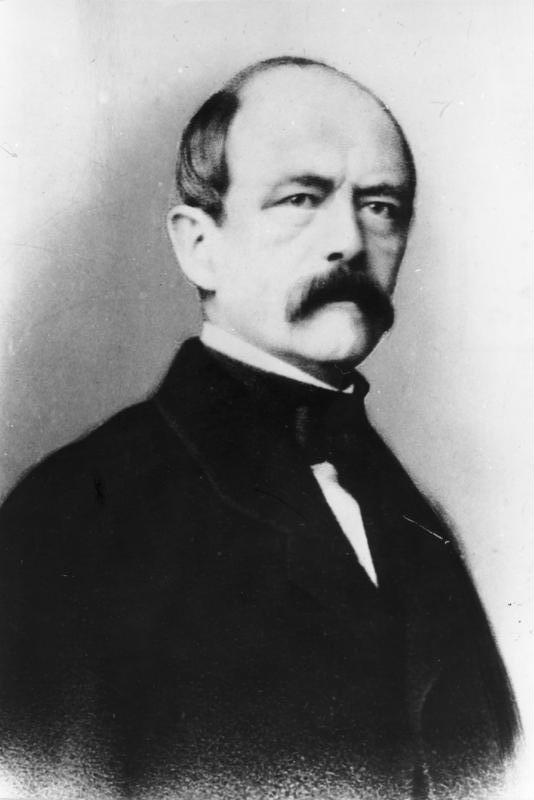

The Reinsurance Treaty was a diplomatic agreement between the German Empire and the Russian Empire that was in effect from 1887 to 1890. The existence of the agreement was not known to the general public, and as such, was only known to a handful of officials in Berlin and St. Petersburg. The treaty played a critical role in German Chancellor Otto von Bismarck's network of alliances and agreements, which aimed to keep the peace in Europe as well as maintaining Germany's economic, diplomatic and political dominance. It helped calm tensions between both Russia and Germany.

The treaty provided that both parties would remain neutral if the other became involved in a war with a third great power, with the exception of if Germany attacked France or if Russia attacked Austria-Hungary. Germany made concessions to Russia by changing its stance on Bulgaria and Eastern Rumelia (now part of southern Bulgaria), agreeing that they were in the Russian sphere of influence and agreeing to support Russian action to keep the Black Sea as its own preserve. After Bismarck lost power in 1890, his enemies in the Foreign Ministry convinced the Kaiser that the treaty was too much in Russia's favor and should not be renewed. The cancellation, as with the treaty itself, was generally held from the public. Russia, however, had not wanted to terminate the alliance. Needing new allies, Russia opened negotiations with Germany's enemy France. The resulting Franco-Russian Alliance of 1891–1892 to 1917 rapidly began to take shape. Historians consider the new alliance a major disaster for Germany and one of the long-term causes of the First World War.

== Background ==
The Reinsurance Treaty originated after the German-Austrian-Russian Dreikaiserbund (League of the Three Emperors) had lapsed in 1887 due to competition between Austria-Hungary and the Russian Empire for spheres of influence in the Balkans. In early 1887, a Russian diplomat went to Berlin to propose a treaty in which Russia would be a friendly neutral country during a war between Germany and France, and in return, Germany would recognize Russian dominance in Bulgaria and promise a friendly neutrality if Russia seized the Turkish Straits from the Ottoman Empire. Bismarck strongly supported the idea, but Alexander III rejected the plan until Foreign Minister Nikolay Girs convinced him that it would be best for Russia in the absence of French friendship. Bismarck refused Russia's request for Germany to stay neutral if Russia went to war against Austria citing that Berlin was in the Triple Alliance with Vienna.

Bismarck had a long-term policy of preserving the peace in Europe, which was threatened by the growing competition between Russia and Austria–Hungary for dominance over the Balkans. He felt that an agreement with Russia was essential to prevent a Russian alliance with France, and he always had the policy of keeping France isolated diplomatically to avoid Germany from fighting a two-front war against both France and Russia. Bismarck risked the expansion of the Russian sphere of influence toward the Mediterranean and diplomatic tensions with Vienna.

The treaty signed by Bismarck and Russian Foreign Minister Nikolay Girs contained two separate agreements:

1. Germany and Russia agreed to observe benevolent neutrality if either become involved in a war with a third country. If Germany attacked France or if Russia attacked Austria-Hungary, that provision would not apply. In those cases, the distinguished bilateral alliances could come into effect. The Reinsurance Treaty applied only if France or Austria–Hungary were the aggressors.
2. Germany would declare neutrality if Russia intervened against the Ottoman control of the Bosphorus and the Dardanelles.

== Non-renewal ==
As part of Bismarck's system of "periphery diversion", the treaty was highly dependent on his prestige. After Kaiser Wilhelm II had removed Bismarck from office in 1890, Russia asked for a renewal of the treaty, but Germany refused. Bismarck's successor, Leo von Caprivi, felt no need to mollify Russia. A main advocate of the non-renewal of the treaty was Count von Berchem, undersecretary at the Foreign Office. During the lead up to the non-renewal of the treaty, Count von Berchem created a memorandum describing why the treaty was unfavorable for Germany and introduced reasons as to why it should not be renewed. The memorandum was given to Chancellor von Caprivi on March 25 and was filed by the Chancellor on March 28 showing its influence over Chancellor von Caprivi. The German foreign policy establishment was unanimous in rejecting a renewal because the treaty contradicted so many other German positions with regard to Austria-Hungary, the United Kingdom, Romania and Italy. For example, the Reinsurance Treaty contradicted the Austro-Romanian Treaty of 1883, in which Germany and Austria-Hungary promised to protect Romania; Russia knew nothing of that treaty.

Kaiser Wilhelm II, who was still highly influential in foreign policy, believed that his personal friendship with Tsar Alexander III would suffice to ensure further genial diplomatic ties. His higher priority was to build better relationships with Britain. Anglo-Russian relations had long been strained by Russia's quest to take control of the Turkish Straits, which link the Black Sea and the Mediterranean. Britain feared that Russian expansion to its south would threaten British colonial interests in the Middle East. In the creation of this treaty, Bismarck was aware of Russian desire to control Constantinople and wished to use to influence an Anglo-Russian conflict so that Germany may consolidate more power within Europe. The non-renewal of the treaty pushed Russia away from Germany's alliance and created a need for Russia to have the military and economic security that came with such a strategic deal. France, desperate for an ally, offered financial help to rebuild the Russian economy and successfully developed the Franco-Russian Alliance in 1894, which ended French isolation. This was a policy that Bismarck utilized to his benefit as he desired to see France ostracized from the complex web of alliances within Europe. The dismissal of Bismarck, the erratic temper of Wilhelm II, and the uncertain policies of the men who succeeded Bismarck were joint causes of the growing international instability. The dismissal of Bismarck as chancellor as well as the non-renewal of the treaty represented a shift in foreign policy strategy for Germany. This is noteworthy because as stated by historian Marcus Jones, this non-renewal was an important feature of Wilhelmine Germany's foreign policy that revealed simplistic thinking in comparison to the foreign policy of Bismarck when he was chancellor.

Anglo-German Agreement of 1890, reshaped imperial control in East Africa and secured a strategic North Sea base for Germany (important for naval strategy and the Kiel Canal). Domestically it provoked debate in Germany about colonial priorities. Reinsurance’s lapse in 1890 removed a key secret guarantee.

In 1896, the retired Bismarck caused a huge sensation by revealing the existence of the treaty to a German newspaper. He blamed his successor, Caprivi, as responsible for the non-renewal in 1890. Bismarck said that the failure of the treaty made it possible for France and Russia to draw together.

Most historians, according to Norman Rich, agree that the Reinsurance Treaty itself was not of great importance while it was in operation, but the failure to renew it marked the decisive turning point of Russia's movement away from Germany and toward France; and so was one of the causes of the First World War, which broke out in 1914. Sidney Fay agrees that it was a turning point, but also argues that non-renewal was only one of several powerful factors pushing Russia and Germany apart. The German treaty with Britain in July 1890 made the Russians falsely suspect that Berlin was drawing closer to London. Pan-Slavism was growing in Russia, with a determination to dominate the Balkans. As a result, Russia and Austria-Hungary became increasingly alienated from each other, and Germany was forced to support its only true ally, Austria-Hungary. A third factor was the renewal of revanchism in France, which made the French much more eager to find an alliance with Russia, despite Russia's long opposition to republicanism.

== See also ==
- Austro–Serbian Alliance of 1881
- Schnaebele Affair
- Mediterranean Agreements
- Treaty of Björkö
- International relations (1814–1919)

== Sources ==
- Rich, Norman (1992). Great power diplomacy, 1814–1914.
- Taylor, A. J. P. (1954). The Struggle for Mastery in Europe 1848–1918. Oxford: Oxford University Press. Wikidata Q141715908.
