= Franco-Russian Alliance =

1892–1917 military alliance

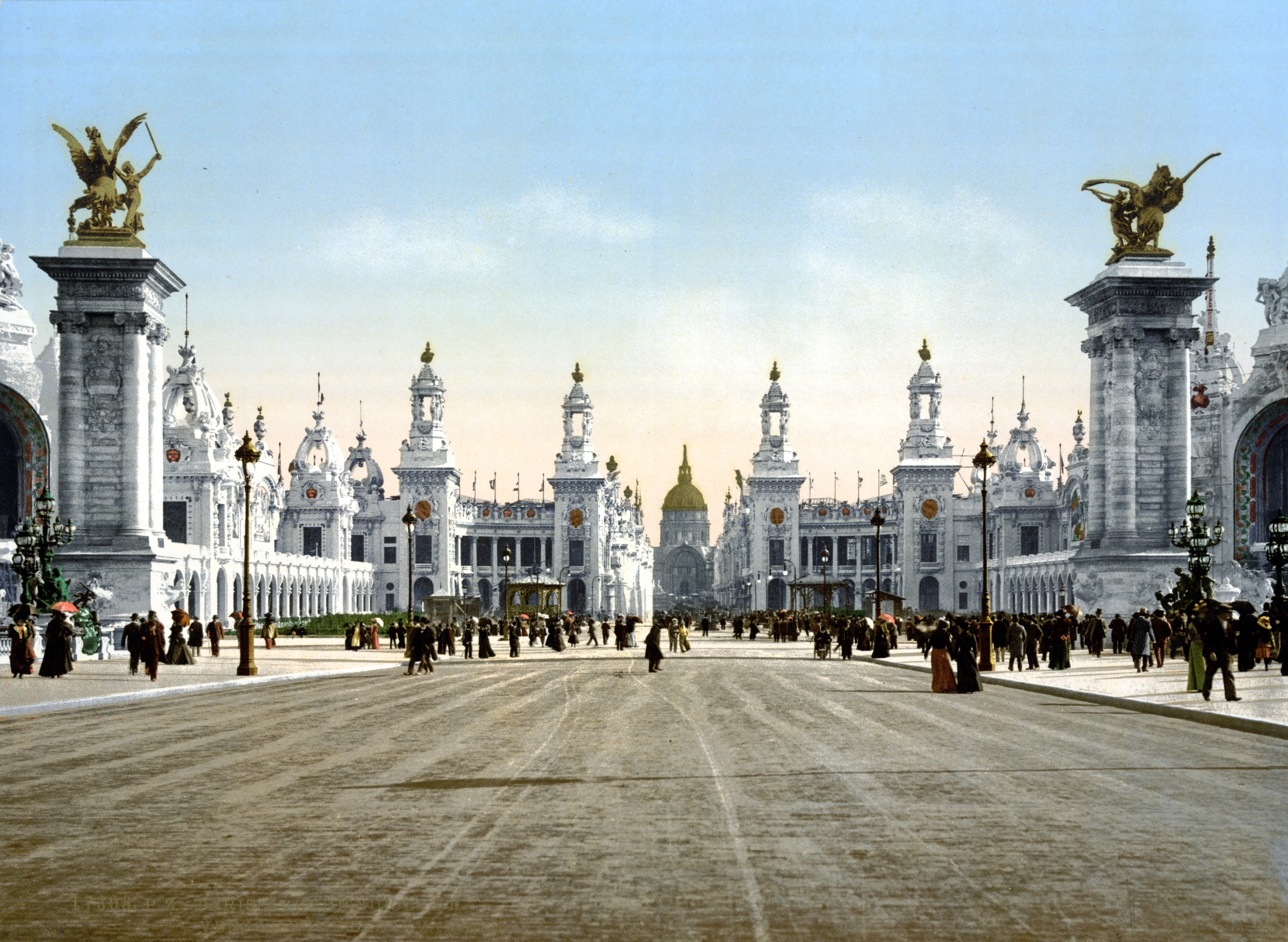
The Pont Alexandre III in Paris (pictured during the 1900 Paris Exposition) and the Trinity Bridge in St Petersburg remain two symbols of the Franco-Russian Alliance.

The Franco-Russian Alliance (French: Alliance Franco-Russe, Russian: Франко-Русский Альянс, romanized: Franko-Russkiy Al'yans), also known as the Dual Entente or Russo-French Rapprochement (Rapprochement Franco-Russe, Русско-Французское Сближение; Russko-Frantsuzskoye Sblizheniye), was an alliance formed by the agreements of 1891–94; it lasted until 1917. The strengthening of the German Empire, the creation of the Triple Alliance of 1882, and the exacerbation of Franco-German and Russo-German tensions at the end of the 1880s led to a common foreign policy and mutual strategic military interests between France and Russia. The development of financial ties between the two countries created the economic prerequisites for the Russo-French Alliance.

== The agreements ==
During a visit by a French squadron to Kronstadt in July 1891, the agreement of 1891 was concluded in the form of an exchange of letters between the ministers of foreign affairs. France was interested significantly more than Russia in a military alliance and endeavored to supplement the 1891 agreement with military obligations. As a result of the negotiations, the representatives of the Russian and French general staffs signed a military convention on August 17 (August 5 in Russian calendar), 1892, which provided for mutual military aid in the event of a German attack. By an exchange of letters between December 27 (December 15), 1893, and January 4, 1894 (December 23, 1893), both governments announced their ratification of the military convention. This formalized the Russo-French military-political alliance.

== History ==
The history of the alliance dates to the beginning of the 1870s, to the rise of a unified, bellicose Germany and the contradictions engendered by the Franco-Prussian War and the Treaty of Frankfurt of 1871. The Russian government had supported France during the war scare of 1875 when Russian and British protests forced Germany to stop threatening an attack on France. In 1876, the German chancellor, Otto von Bismarck, attempted unsuccessfully to obtain from Russia a guarantee to preserve the territory of Alsace-Lorraine as part of Germany in exchange for unconditional support by Germany for Russian policy in the East. In 1877, during the new Franco-German war scare, Russia maintained friendly relations with France. However, after the Congress of Berlin in 1878, French diplomacy, in aiming at a rapprochement with Great Britain and Germany, assumed a hostile position vis-à-vis Russia. France's alienation from Russia and her policy of colonial seizures lasted until 1885 when the Franco-German contradictions became heightened after the French victory in Annam. Early in 1887, new complications arose in Franco-German relations. France appealed to the Russian government for aid. In concluding the so-called Reinsurance Treaty with Germany in 1887, Russia insisted on maintaining for France the same conditions that Germany had stipulated for its ally, Austria-Hungary.

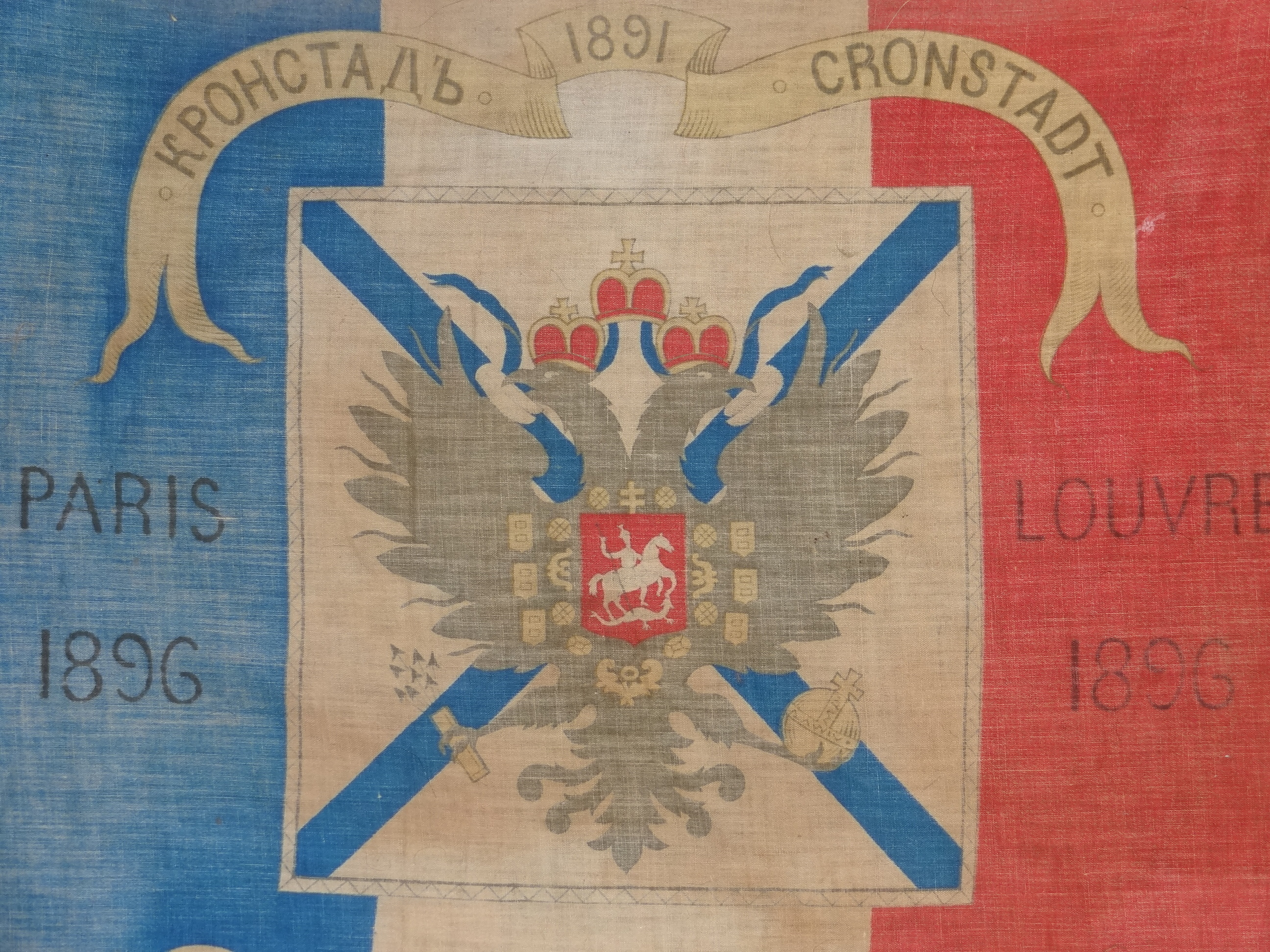
Commemorative flag

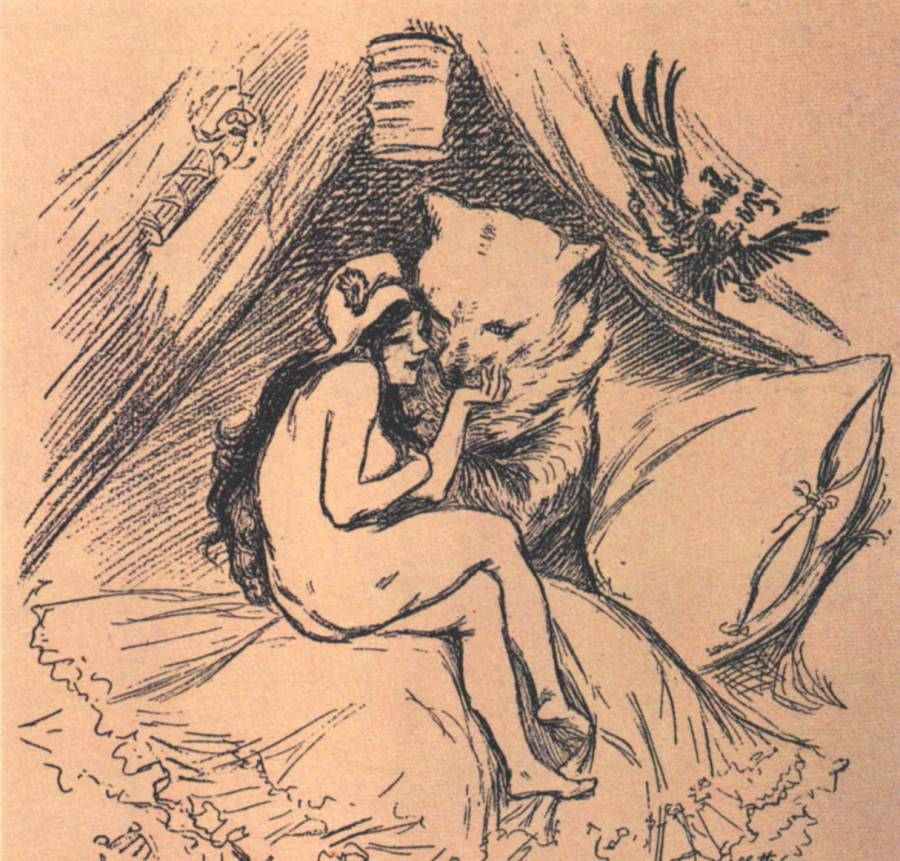
1893 political cartoon depicting the Franco-Russian Alliance: Marianne and the Russian bear embrace

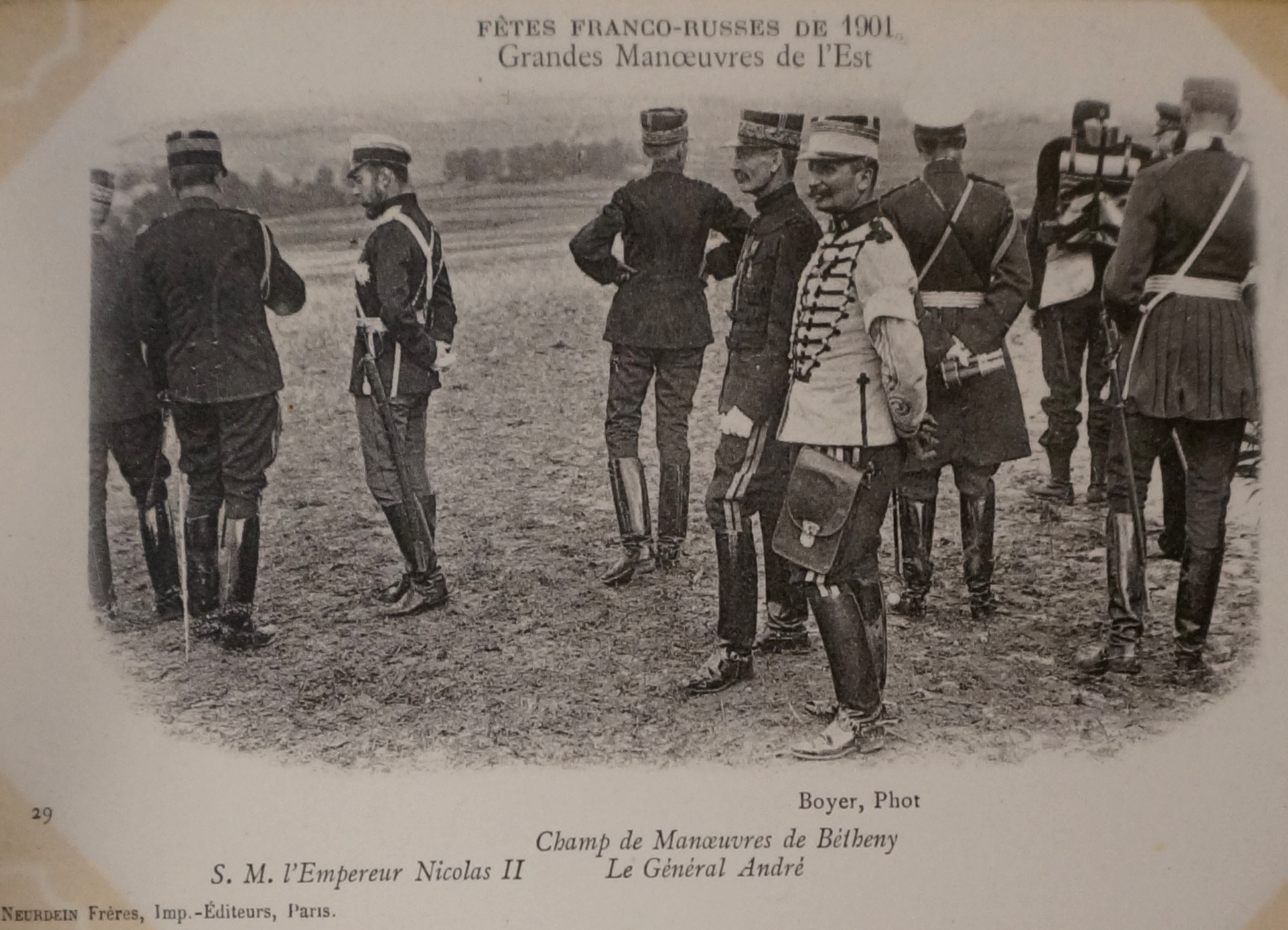
Nicholas II and French minister of war

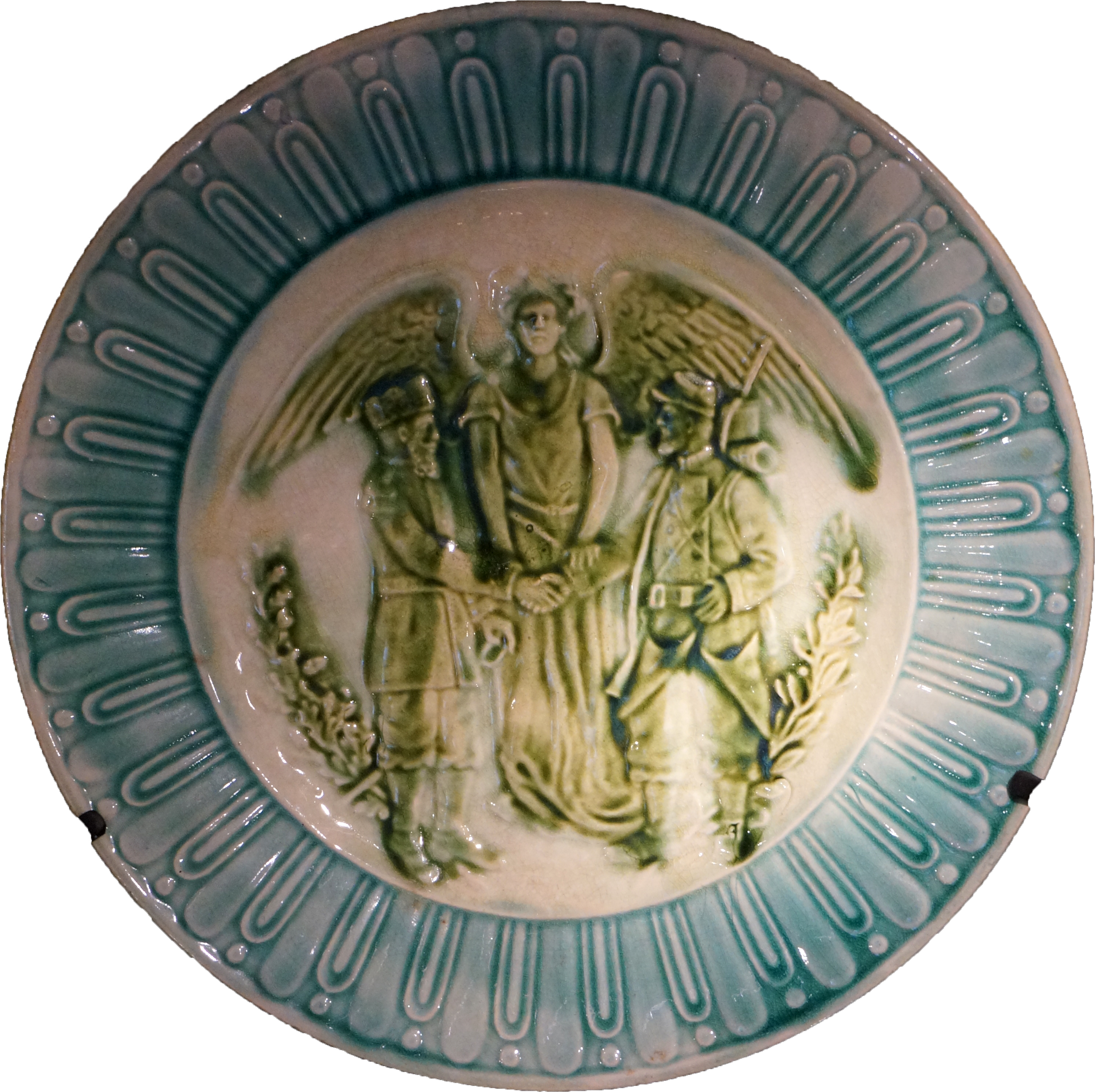
Commemorative plate

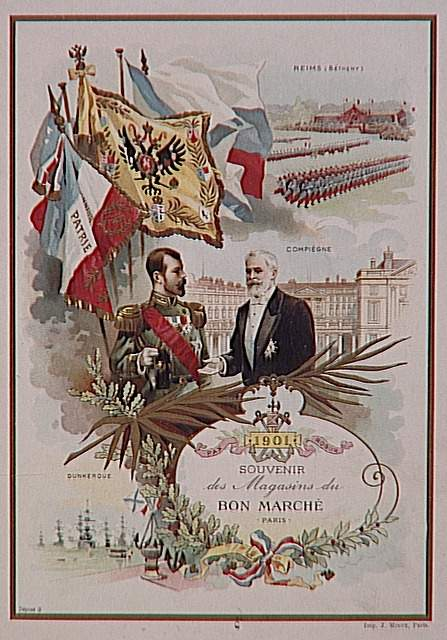
Design distributed by a firm (Great Stores of Le Bon Marché) during and after the visit of Nicolas II to France

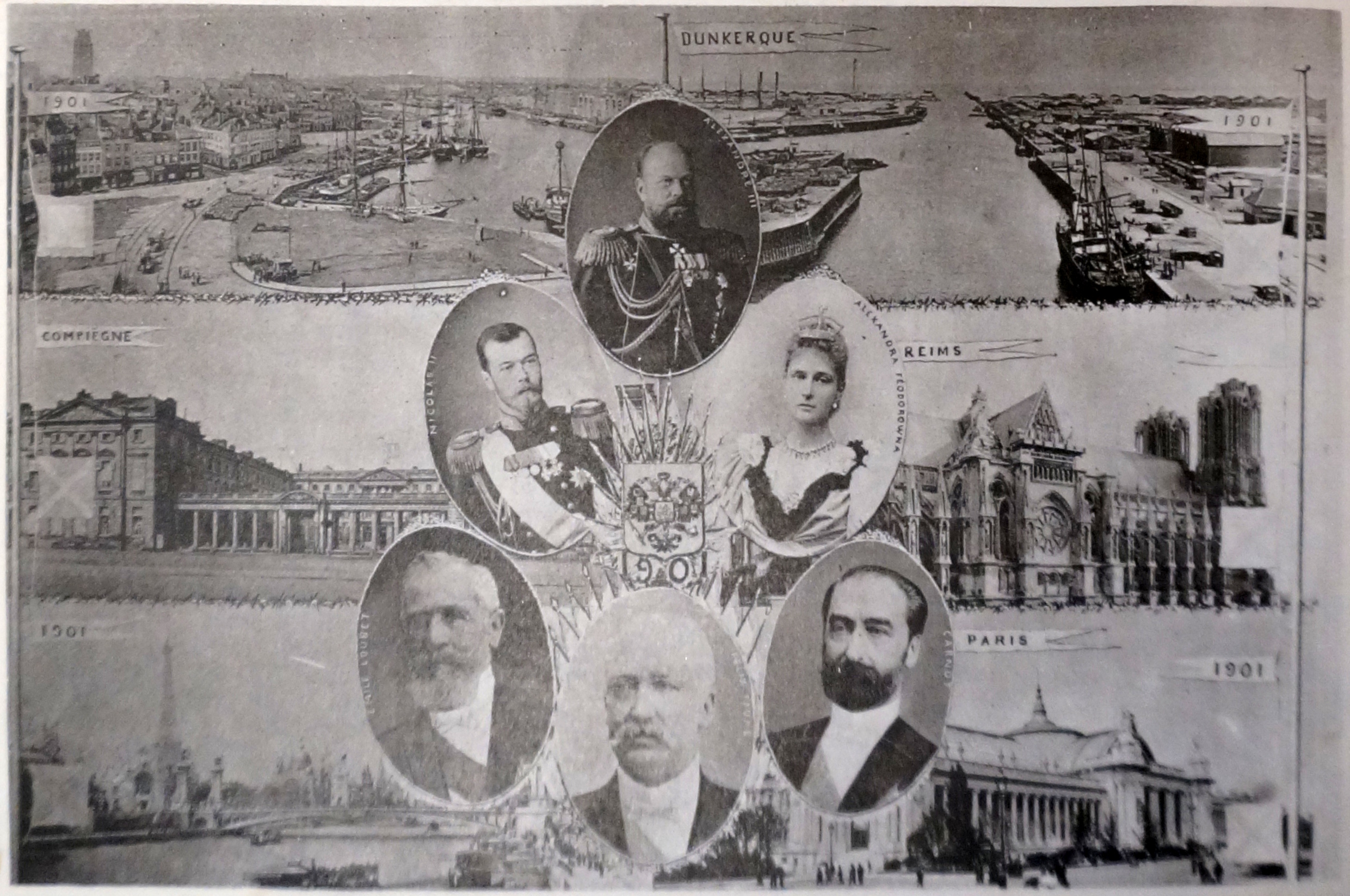
Souvenir postcard of the French maneuvers of 1901

At the end of the 1880s, Russo-German economic discrepancies grew stronger. The Russo-French political rapprochement contributed to the influx of French capital into Russia. At the end of the 1880s and the beginning of the 1890s, Russia received a number of large loans from France. The deterioration of Russo-German relations, the resurrection of the Triple Alliance in 1891, and the rumors that Great Britain would join the alliance laid the grounds for the conclusion of a political agreement between Russia and France. It was a response to the formation of a military bloc (the Triple Alliance) headed by Germany. In Europe, two opposing hostile imperialist blocs had formed.

Relying on Russian support, France intensified its colonial policy. After the Fashoda Incident of 1898 with Great Britain, it endeavored even more to strengthen the alliance with Russia. The alliance with France also facilitated the tsarist government's expansion into Manchuria in the 1890s. During the preparatory period and the first years of the existence of the Russo-French Alliance, the determining role was played by Russia, but in time the situation altered. By constantly receiving new loans from France, Russian tsarism gradually fell into financial dependence on French imperialism. The term "Franco-Russian Marseillaise" refers not to a single musical composition, but to a symbolic and performative phenomenon that emerged during the late 19th and early 20th centuries as France and Russia developed closer diplomatically.

The Dual Alliance was tested, aligning together with Germany during the Sino-Japanese conflict.

Prior to World War I, the cooperation of the general staffs of both countries assumed closer forms. In 1912 a Russo-French naval convention was signed. Russia and France entered the war united by the treaty of alliance. This had a significant effect on the course and outcome of the war since it forced Germany from the first days of the war to fight on two fronts. This led to the defeat of Germany in the First Battle of the Marne, to the collapse of the Schlieffen Plan, and finally to the defeat of Germany. The Russo-French Alliance was nullified by the Bolshevik government in 1917, which also repudiated all foreign debts, including to France.

== See also ==
- Causes of World War I
- Foreign alliances of France
- French entry into World War I
- Historiography of the causes of World War I
- International relations of the Great Powers (1814–1919)
- Continental League
- Triple Entente

== Sources ==
- Becker, Julius Lucas (2025). "Testing the Bonds: Franco-Russian Alliance and the First Sino-Japanese War". Australian Journal of Politics & History. 71 (2): 191–208. doi:10.1111/ajph.13014.
- Hillis, Faith (2017). "The "Franco-Russian Marseillaise"". The Journal of Modern History. 89 (1): 39–78. doi:10.1086/690124. JSTOR 26548391.
- Matheson, Mary Carol (2018). Reframing Russia in France: 'Popular Diplomacy' and the Franco-Russian Military Alliance, 1871–1901 (PhD). Vancouver: University of British Columbia. doi:10.14288/1.0365281. hdl:2429/65196.
- Otte, T. G. (2006). "From 'War-in-Sight' to Nearly War: Anglo–French Relations in the Age of High Imperialism, 1875–1898". Diplomacy and Statecraft. 17 (4): 693–714. doi:10.1080/09592290600943064.
- Rich, Norman (1992). Great Power Diplomacy, 1814-1914. pp. 216–62, 391–407.
- Taylor, A. J. P. (1954). The Struggle for Mastery in Europe 1848–1918. Oxford: Oxford University Press. Wikidata Q141715908.
