= Triple Alliance (1882) =

Alliance between Germany, Austria-Hungary, and Italy

Triple Alliance: Dreibund (German); Hármas szövetség (Hungarian); Triplice alleanza (Italian)
- 1882–1915
- The Triple Alliance as opposed to the Triple Entente in 1914
- Status: Military alliance
- Historical era: 19th century • 20th century
  - Dual Alliance (Germany / Austria-Hungary): 7 October 1879
  - Triple Alliance (Germany / Austria-Hungary / Italy): 20 May 1882
  - Italy leaves: 3 May 1915
Preceded by	Succeeded by
Dual Alliance (1879)	Central Powers

The Triple Alliance was a defensive military alliance between Germany, Austria-Hungary, and Italy. It was formed on 20 May 1882 and renewed periodically until it expired in 1915 during World War I. Germany and Austria-Hungary had been closely allied since 1879. Italy was looking for support against France shortly after it lost North African ambitions to the French. Each member promised mutual support in the event of an attack by any other great power. The treaty provided that Germany and Austria-Hungary were to assist Italy if it was attacked by France without provocation. In turn, Italy would assist Germany if attacked by France without provocation. In the event of a war between Austria-Hungary and Russia, Italy promised to remain neutral. After the Austro-Hungarian empire and Germany declared war without first being attacked by other nations, Italy did not take part in World War I on the side of the Central Powers and later joined on the side of the Allied Powers.

When the treaty was renewed in February 1887, Italy gained an empty promise of German support of Italian colonial ambitions in North Africa in return for Italy's continued friendship. Austria-Hungary had to be pressured by German chancellor Otto von Bismarck into accepting the principles of consultation and mutual agreement with Italy on any territorial changes initiated in the Balkans or on the coasts and islands of the Adriatic and Aegean seas. Italy and Austria-Hungary did not overcome their basic conflict of interest in that region despite the treaty. In 1891, attempts were made to join Britain to the Triple Alliance, which, though unsuccessful, were widely believed to have succeeded in Russian diplomatic circles.

Shortly after renewing the Alliance in June 1902, Italy secretly extended a similar guarantee to France. By a particular agreement, neither Austria-Hungary nor Italy would change the status quo in the Balkans without previous consultation. (Note: "However, if, in the course of events, the maintenance of the status quo in the regions of the Balkans or of the Ottoman coasts and islands in the Adriatic and in the Aegean Sea should become impossible, and if, whether in consequence of the action of a third Power or otherwise, Austria-Hungary or Italy should find themselves under the necessity of modifying it by a temporary or permanent occupation on their part, this occupation shall take place only after a previous agreement between the two Powers, based upon the principle of a reciprocal compensation for every advantage, territorial or other, which each of them might obtain beyond the present status quo, and giving satisfaction to the interests and well founded claims of the two Parties.") On 1 November 1902, five months after the Triple Alliance was renewed, Italy reached an understanding with France that each would remain neutral in the event of an attack on the other.

Italy and Russia sign Racconigi Bargain in 1909 occurred shortly after which Austria-Hungary unilaterally annexed Bosnia and Herzegovina, Russia initially faced with German backing of Austria-Hungary, Russian diplomacy eventually yielded, formalized by amendments to the Treaty of Berlin in April 1909. Italy secretly acknowledged Russian interests in the Turkish Straits (Bosporus and Dardanelles). In return, Russia recognized Italian claims in Tripoli and Cyrenaica, facilitating Italy's later Tripolitanian War. The bargaining over Eastern Europe, particularly Italian recognition of Russian straits ambitions, was seen as a potential encroachment on Austrian influence in the Balkans. This tension compounded Austria-Hungary's security concerns after the loss of Russian support during the Bosnian Crisis, tightening reliance on Germany and Italy.

The triple alliance members attended the Conference of the Ambassadors in 1912 after the Balkan Wars declared armistice.

When the Austro-Hungarian Empire decided to start a war in August 1914 with the rival Triple Entente, Italy proclaimed its neutrality, considering Austria-Hungary the aggressor. Italy defaulted on the obligation to consult and agree to compensations before changing the status quo in the Balkans, as agreed in 1912 renewal of the Triple Alliance. Following parallel negotiation with both Triple Alliance (which aimed to keep Italy neutral) and the Triple Entente (which aimed to make Italy enter the conflict), Italy sided with the Triple Entente and declared war on Austria-Hungary. On 18 October 1883 Carol I of Romania, through his Prime Minister Ion C. Brătianu, had also secretly pledged to support the Triple Alliance, but he later remained neutral in the First World War due to viewing Austria-Hungary as the aggressor.

== Germany ==
The man chiefly responsible for the Triple Alliance was Otto von Bismarck, the Chancellor of Germany. His primary goal was to preserve the status quo in Europe after he had unified Germany in 1871. He was particularly concerned about France finding allies to help it regain Alsace-Lorraine. By promising to aid Austria-Hungary and Italy in the event of an attack, Bismarck sought to make them somewhat dependent on Germany and therefore unsympathetic to French adventures.

== Austria-Hungary ==
By the late 1870s, Austrian territorial ambitions in both the Italian Peninsula and Central Europe had been thwarted by the rise of Italy and Germany as new powers. With the decline and the failed reforms of the Ottoman Empire, Slavic discontent in the occupied Balkans grew, which both Russia and Austria-Hungary saw as an opportunity to expand in the region. In 1876, Russia offered to partition the Balkans, but the Hungarian statesman Gyula Andrássy declined because Austria-Hungary was already a "saturated" state and could not cope with additional territories. The whole empire was thus drawn into a new style of diplomatic brinkmanship, which was first conceived of by Andrássy, centering on the province of Bosnia and Herzegovina, a predominantly-Slav area that was still under the control of the Ottoman Empire.

On the heels of the Great Balkan Crisis, Austro-Hungarian forces occupied Bosnia and Herzegovina in August 1878, and Austria-Hungary eventually annexed Bosnia and Herzegovina in October 1908 as a common holding under the control of the finance ministry, rather than attaching it to either Austria or Hungary. The occupation of Bosnia-Herzegovina was a step taken in response to Russian advances into Bessarabia. Unable to mediate between the Ottoman and the Russian Empires over the control of Serbia, Austria–Hungary declared neutrality when the conflict between the empires escalated into war. To counter Russian and French interests in Europe, an alliance was concluded with Germany in October 1879 and with Italy in May 1882.

== Italy ==
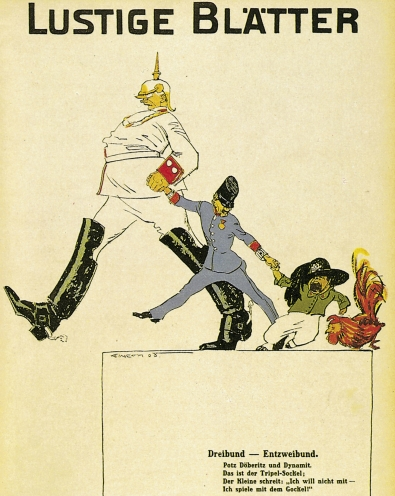
Cartoon of the Berlin satirical journal Lustige Blätter. In the Triple Alliance, an adult German drags the Austrian boy along, while the Italian child throws a tantrum to stay with the French cockerel.

The Kingdom of Italy had several motives for joining the existing Austro-German alliance. The Italian government at that time was controlled by conservatives, who sympathized ideologically with the two monarchies. Also, Catholic Austria was a traditional protector of the Papacy, which Italy had poor relations with. Perhaps most importantly, Italy was seeking potential allies against the French Third Republic. Italy, like most of the other European powers, wanted to set up colonies and build up an overseas empire. Although France had supported Italian unification, Italy's colonial ambitions in Africa and the colonial ambitions of France quickly came into a rivalry. That was reflected in anger at the French conquest of Tunisia in 1881, the so-called Slap of Tunis by the Italian press, which many Italians had seen as a potential colony. By joining the Alliance, Italy hoped to guarantee itself support in case of foreign aggression. The main alliance compelled any signatory country to support the other parties if two other countries attacked. Germany had won the Franco-Prussian War 1870/71 and was a natural ally for Italy. Thus, Italy found itself coming to terms with its historical enemy, Austria-Hungary, against which Italy had fought three wars in the 34 years before the signing of the first treaty. (Note: The First, Second and Third Italian Wars of Independence.)

However, Italian public opinion remained unenthusiastic about Italy's alignment with Austria-Hungary, a past enemy of Italian unification and whose Italian-populated districts in the Trentino and Istria were seen as occupied territories by Italian irredentists. In the years before World War I, many distinguished military analysts predicted that Italy would attack its supposed ally in the event of a large scale conflict. On its own hand, the Austro-Hungarian General Staff maintained at least from 1903 plans for a possible war against Rome. Mutual suspicions led to reinforcement of the frontier and speculation in the press about a war between the two countries into the first decade of the 20th century. As late as 1911, Count Franz Conrad von Hötzendorf, the chief of the Austro-Hungarian General Staff, was advocating a preemptive strike against Austria's supposed Italian ally. That prediction was strengthened by Italy's invasion and annexation of Libya, bringing it into conflict with the German-backed Ottoman Empire.

== Romania ==
Romania, which had since 1866 been ruled by Carol I, a member of the German Hohenzollern Dynasty, naturally veered towards the German sphere of influence, which included allying with the Triple Alliance. Other motives that led to Romania's alignment with the faction included Germany's military prowess on the continent and fears of further Russian expansion into historically Romanian-inhabited regions, such as the Russian annexation of Bessarabia in 1812. These motives led Romania to secretly join the Triple Alliance on 18 October 1883. Only the King and a select handful of senior Romanian politicians knew about the political manoeuvre. Despite being allies on paper, the relations between Romania and Austria-Hungary weren't particularly cordial, as the two incongruous neighbours withheld various points of contention with each other, most notably the status and representation of the Romanians in Transylvania, a region owned by the Hungarian Crown but inhabited by a Romanian majority. Romania managed to develop into a regional power in the aftermath of the Second Balkan War and the 1913 Treaty of Bucharest, however a year later World War I broke out. Although Romania was invoked by Austria-Hungary to join the war under the guidance of being a member of the Triple Alliance, it followed Italy's example of neutrality due to the fact that Austria-Hungary had taken the offensive by starting the war against Serbia, and thus was fighting an offensive not defensive war. Following Italy's withdrawal from the alliance in 1915 and acceptance into the Entente and the consolidation of the Central Powers, the alliance was rendered virtually meaningless, and eventually Romania would take up arms against all member states of the Central Powers starting on 27 August 1916. Despite many Romanian participation in the war alongside the Austro-Hungarian Armed Forces.

== Sources ==
- Conybeare, John A. C., and Todd Sandler (December 1990). "The Triple Entente and the Triple Alliance 1880–1914: A Collective Goods Approach" (PDF). American Political Science Review. 84(4): 1197–1206. doi:10.2307/1963259.
- Conybeare, John A. C. (March 1992). "A Portfolio Diversification Model of Alliances: The Triple Alliance and Triple Entente, 1879–1914". Journal of Conflict Resolution 36.1: 53–85. JSTOR 174505.
- Kann, Robert (1974). A History of the Habsburg Empire. University of California Press. pp. 470–472. ISBN 9780520042063.
- Langer, William L. (1951). European Alliances and Alignments, 1871–1890 (2nd ed.). pp. 217–50. A standard scholarly history.
- Lutz, Ralph Haswell (ed.)(1932). Fall of the German Empire, 1914–1918 (Documents of the German Revolution, volumes I and II). Stanford, Calif.: Stanford University Press. Online review. Primary sources.
- Macmillan, Margaret (2013). The War That Ended Peace: The Road to 1914. Chapter 8.
- Pribram, Alfred Francis (ed.)(1921). The Secret Treaties of Austria-Hungary, 1879–1914 Vol. 2. The most thorough history of the Triple Alliance, with text of major documents.
- Rothenburg, Gunther E. (1976). The Army of Francis Joseph. West Lafayette: Purdue University Press. pp. 124–125. ISBN 9781557531452.
- Schmitt, Bernadotte E. (1924). "Triple Alliance and Triple Entente, 1902–1914". American Historical Review. 29#3: 449–473. JSTOR 1836520.
- Sontag, Raymond James (1933). European Diplomatic History, 1871–1932. Century Historical Series. New York: Century Company. pp. 99–152. OCLC 503861831. Online review.
