= Constitution of the German Confederation =

German constitution of 1815 to 1866

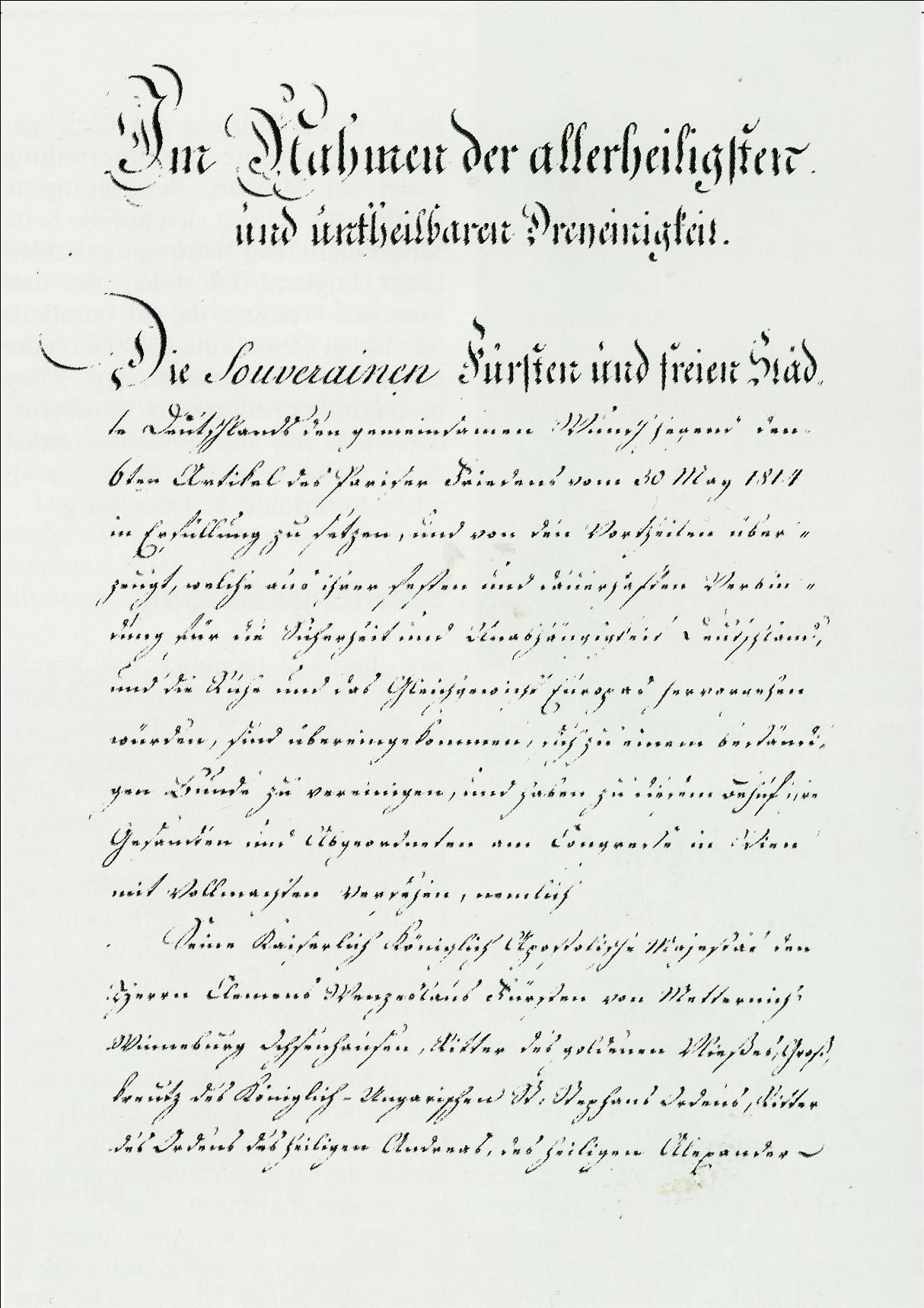
First page of the Constitution of the German Confederation

The Constitution of the German Confederation, or German Federal Act (German: Deutsche Bundesakte), was the constitution for the German Confederation as set forth in the Final Act of the Congress of Vienna. Out of the 360 states of the former Holy Roman Empire, it established a confederation of 39 states under the presidency of the Emperor of Austria. In its initial form, the Constitution came into effect on 8 June 1815.

The preamble states that the Constitution's purpose was "the safety and independence of Germany" united in "perpetual Confederation". Each state pledged to protect every other state and Germany as a whole if attacked. All states were also required to adopt their own constitutions. Since the 1815 Constitution was only an initial framework, it was expanded effective 8 June 1820. In its final form, the Constitution was notably conservative, enshrining the monarchical principle and giving the Confederation the right to intervene against "dangerous movements" in any member state.

The Constitution of the German Confederation went out of force when the Confederation dissolved in 1866 following Prussia's victory in the Austro-Prussian War and the establishment of the North German Confederation.

== History ==
=== Origin ===
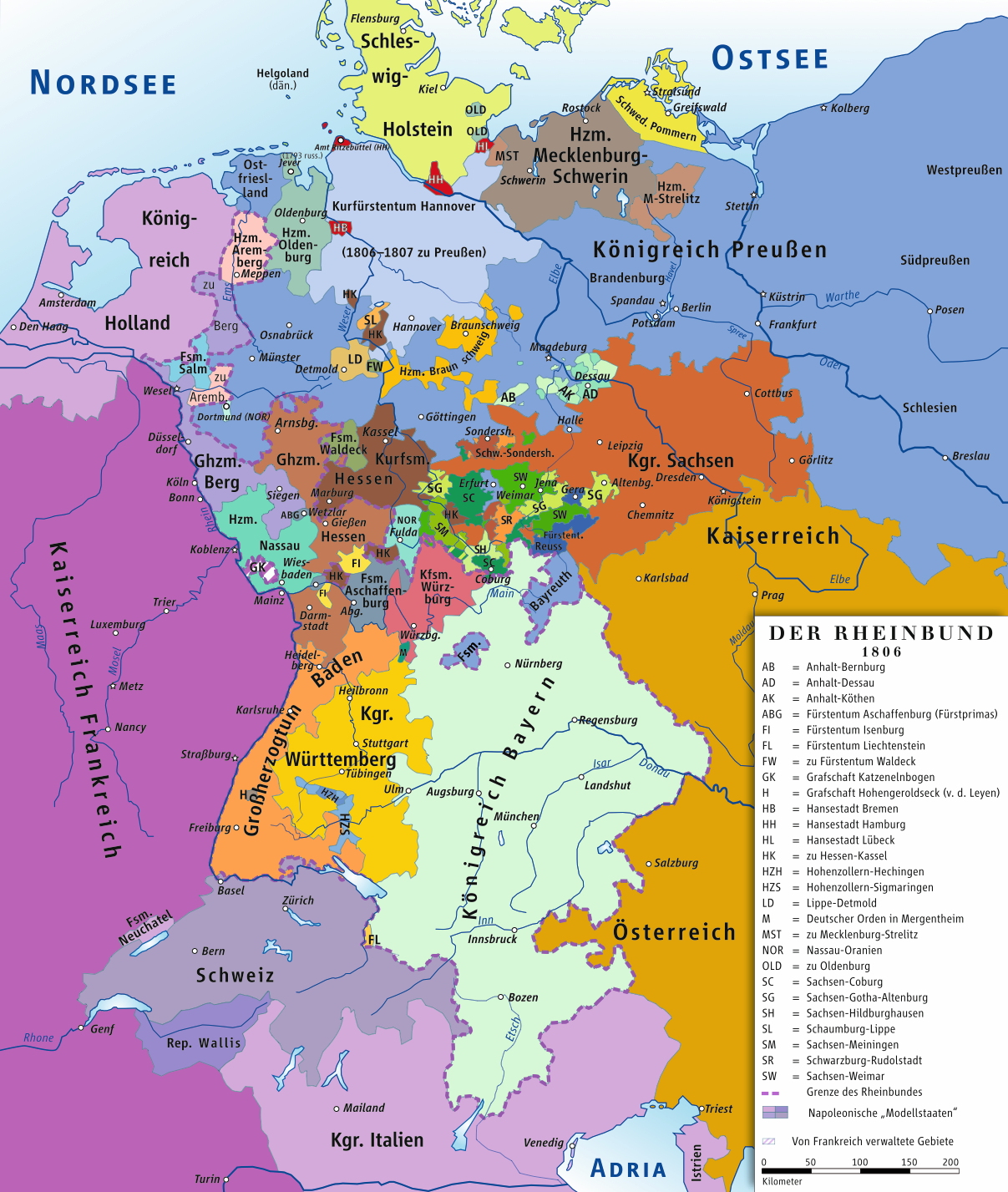
The Confederation of the Rhine in 1806

In 1806, after the French defeated Austria and Russia in the Battle of Austerlitz, Napoleon combined 16 German states – to be joined over the next 2 years by 19 others – into a confederation of French client states. The territory of the Confederation of the Rhine closely coincided with what remained in the Holy Roman Empire at the outbreak of the French Revolution, with the notable exceptions of Belgium, Austria, Prussia and the western bank of the Rhine, which France had annexed. The creation of the Confederation effectively brought about the dissolution of the Holy Roman Empire.

In the spring of 1814, the major powers in the Sixth Coalition, which had defeated Napoleon and exiled him to the island of Elba, agreed that Germany should in future be a confederation of states in accordance with Article 6 of the 30 May 1814 Treaty of Paris, which had ended the war: "The States of Germany shall be independent and united by a Federative Bond." Initial negotiations at the Congress of Vienna failed because Bavaria and Württemberg maintained their rigid particularism (the principle that the states of a confederation should be allowed to retain their own laws and promote their own interests). The impasse in the negotiations on Germany's future organisation was broken by the sense of urgency that arose when Napoleon temporarily returned from exile in March 1815. Prussia and the Austrian Empire came to an agreement on a confederation of states, a draft of which the Austrian Chancellor Prince Metternich forwarded to the assembly of the individual German states on 23 May 1815.

=== Adoption ===
A revised draft from 2 June 1815 was approved by a majority of the assembly of states as the Constitution of the German Confederation on 8 June 1815, with Württemberg and Baden not participating and Bavaria and Saxony not voting. Saxony joined on 6 June and Bavaria on 8 June, which allowed the Constitution to be adopted and signed that day. Baden followed on 26 July and Württemberg on 1 September 1815. The Constitution of the German Confederation was part of the Final Act of the Congress of Vienna, which was signed on 9 June 1815. The signatory powers of the Congress of Vienna became guarantor powers of the German Confederation.

== Contents ==
States of the German Confederation, 1815–1866

The Constitution created the German Confederation as a "perpetual union" of the sovereign princes and free cities of Germany (Art. 1) with the aim of maintaining the "external and internal safety of Germany, and ... the independence and inviolability of the confederated States" (Art. 2). The affairs of the Confederation, all of whose members had equal rights (Art. 3), were to be managed by a Federal Convention (Bundesversammlung) presided over by Austria. The Assembly had a total of 17 votes: twelve of the states had a single vote, while the remaining five votes were cast by defined groups of states. The four free cities (Hamburg, Bremen, Lübeck and Frankfurt), for example, formed a group and had a single vote (Art. 4 and 5). If the matter being voted on affected the Constitution itself, a total of 96 votes were allocated to the member states based on their size. Austria and Prussia each had 4, whereas the four free cities each had a single vote (Art. 6). Every member state could make and support propositions (Art. 5). The Assembly's first order of business was to be "the enactment of the fundamental laws of the Confederation, and of its Organic Institutions, with respect to its exterior, military, and interior relations" (Art. 10).

Each member state was pledged to protect every other member state and Germany as a whole from foreign attack, and also not to attack another member state. Individual states could enter into treaties on their own, as long as they were not directed against any other member state or the Confederation (Art. 11).

Article 13 stated that "There will be estates constitutions (landständische Verfassungen) in all German states". The article did not define what was to be understood by such a constitution, nor did it stipulate how soon a sovereign had to provide for one. This led to various interpretations within the Confederation and to major differences between the state constitutions. The Principality of Schaumburg-Lippe and the Grand Duchy of Saxe-Weimar-Eisenach adopted state constitutions in 1816, the Grand Duchy of Baden and the Kingdom of Bavaria followed suit in 1818, the Kingdom of Württemberg in 1819 and Hesse-Darmstadt in 1820. By 1848, apart from Prussia and Austria, only the Grand Duchy of Oldenburg and Hesse-Homburg had not yet adopted state constitutions. Article 13 of the Constitution of the German Confederation was largely responsible for the early appearance of constitutionalism in Germany, particularly in the southern states.

Article 16 guaranteed equality of civic and political rights among the Christian faiths. It also stated that an attempt should be made to improve the civic rights of Jews.

At its first meeting, the Federal Convention was to begin work on decrees ensuring freedom of the press and safeguarding the rights of writers and publishers against copying (copyright protection) (Art. 18).

== Expanded constitution ==
Since the Constitution of the German Confederation was only a framework agreement, it had to be expanded. The amendment to it, which took four years to draft, was adopted by the Vienna Ministerial Conference on 25 November 1819 and unanimously approved by the Federal Convention in Frankfurt on 8 June 1820. The Final Act of the Vienna Ministerial Conference came into immediate force, and the German Confederation under Austrian leadership received its final legal basis.

The revision of the Constitution was written in 65 articles and expressed the politically and socially conservative objectives of the Confederation. It stipulated that the Confederation should be purely defensive in matters of war and peace. Its task was "self-defence" and the "preservation of Germany's independence and external security" (Article 35). For all states – with the exception of the free cities – the monarchical principle applied, according to which all power lay with the respective head of state (Article 57).

The Confederation reserved the right to intervene directly in the event of "open rebellion" or "dangerous movements" in individual federal states (Article 26). The German Confederation thus expressly secured the right to intervene to maintain the political and social status quo, as was the case for the whole of Europe under the core states of the Holy Alliance – Russia, Austria and Prussia.

== Dissolution ==
The German Confederation came to an end when Prussia defeated Austria in the Austro-Prussian War of 1866. By Article II of the Preliminary Peace of Nikolsburg of 26 July 1866, Emperor Franz Joseph I of Austria expressly recognised the dissolution of the Confederation. The Peace of Prague of 23 August 1866 confirmed the dissolution in Article IV. The Federal Convention held its last session on 24 August 1866 in Augsburg with the participation of just nine representatives. The Constitution of the German Confederation went out of force on that day.
