= Judenzählung =

WWI census of Jewish German soldiers

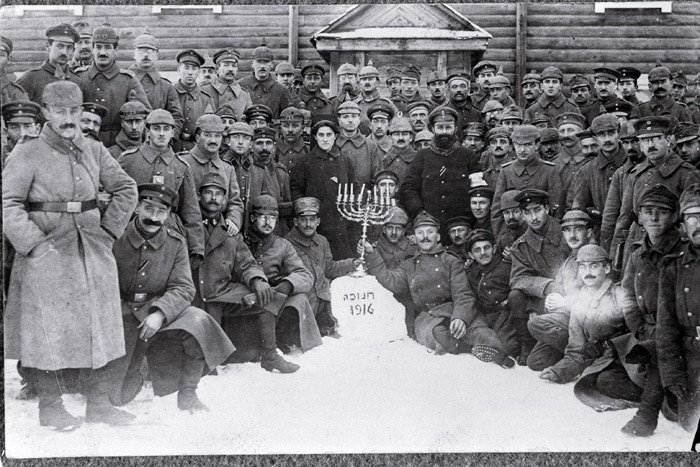
German Jewish soldiers celebrate Hanukkah, 1916

Judenzählung ([ˈjuːdn̩ˌtsɛːlʊŋ], German for "Jew census / counting") was a measure instituted by the Imperial German Army's Oberste Heeresleitung (OHL) in October 1916, during the upheaval of World War I. Designed to confirm accusations of the lack of patriotism among German Jews, the census disproved the charges, but its results were not made public. However, its figures were published in an antisemitic brochure. Jewish authorities, who themselves had compiled statistics that considerably exceeded the figures in the brochure, were denied access to government archives, and informed by the Republican Minister of Defense that the brochure's contents were correct. In the atmosphere of growing antisemitism, many German Jews saw "the Great War" as an opportunity to prove their commitment to the German homeland.

== Background ==
The census was seen as a way to prove that Jews were betraying the Fatherland by shirking military service. According to Amos Elon,

"In October 1916, when almost three thousand Jews had already died on the battlefield and more than seven thousand had been decorated, War Minister Wild von Hohenborn saw fit to sanction the growing prejudices. He ordered a "Jew census" in the army to determine the actual number of Jews on the front lines as opposed to those serving in the rear. Ignoring protests in the Reichstag and the press, he proceeded with his head count. The results were not made public, ostensibly to "spare Jewish feelings." The truth was that the census disproved the accusations: 80 percent served on the front lines."

The official position was that the census was intended to discredit growing anti-semitic sentiments and rumors. However, the evidence indicated that the government's intention was the opposite: to acquire confirmation of the purported ill deeds.

There was a long history of Jews in Germany being discriminated against, oppressed, and denied rank within the military and other government institutions. This fact disproves the "less than eager to serve" attitude of Jews in Germany.

== Results and reactions ==
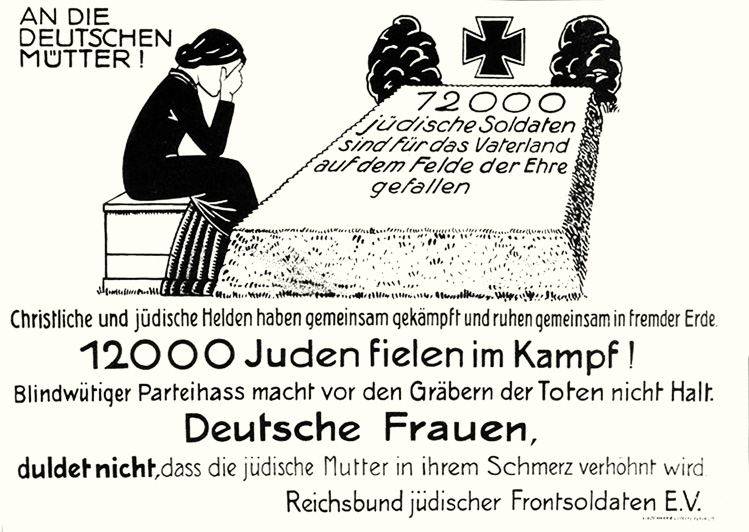
"12,000 Jewish soldiers died on the field of honor for the fatherland." A leaflet published in 1920 by German Jewish veterans in response to accusations of the lack of patriotism

The results of the census were never officially released by the army and any records of the census were most likely lost when the German military archives were destroyed during the allied bombing campaigns of Berlin and Potsdam. The episode marked a shocking moment for the Jewish community, which had passionately backed the war effort and displayed great patriotism; many Jews saw it as an opportunity to prove their commitment to the German homeland. Estimates vary on the total numbers but between 62,515 and 100,000 served in the Army; 12,000 perished in battle, while another 35,000 were decorated for bravery.

That their fellow countrymen could turn on them was a source of major dismay for most German Jews, and the moment marked a point of rapid decline in what some historians called "Jewish-German symbiosis." Judenzählung, denounced by German Jews as a "statistical monstrosity", was a catalyst for intensified antisemitism. The episode also led increasing numbers of young German Jews to accept Zionism, as they realized that full assimilation into German society was unattainable.

German Jewish writer Arnold Zweig, who had volunteered for the army and seen action in the rank of private in France, Hungary and Serbia, was stationed at the Western Front when the Judenzählung census was undertaken. Zweig wrote in a letter to Martin Buber, dated February 15:

"The Judenzählung was a reflection of unheard sadness for Germany's sin and our agony... If there was no antisemitism in the Army, the unbearable call to duty would be almost easy."

Shaken by the experience, Zweig began to revise his views on the war and to realize that it pitted Jews against Jews. Later he described his experiences in the short story Judenzählung vor Verdun and became an active pacifist.

== See also ==
- Frontkämpferprivileg
- History of the Jews in Germany
