= Federal Convention (German Confederation) =

Central institution of the German Confederation

Federal Convention Confederate Diet Bundesversammlung Bundestag
- German Confederation

Type
- Houses: Inner Council; Plenary Session

History
- Established: 8 June 1815
- Disbanded: 18 May 1848; 18 August 1866
- Preceded by: Imperial Diet
- Succeeded by: Frankfurt National Assembly (1848–1849); North German Reichstag
- Seats: 17 Inner Council; 69 Plenary Session

Elections
- Voting system: Royal appointment

Meeting place
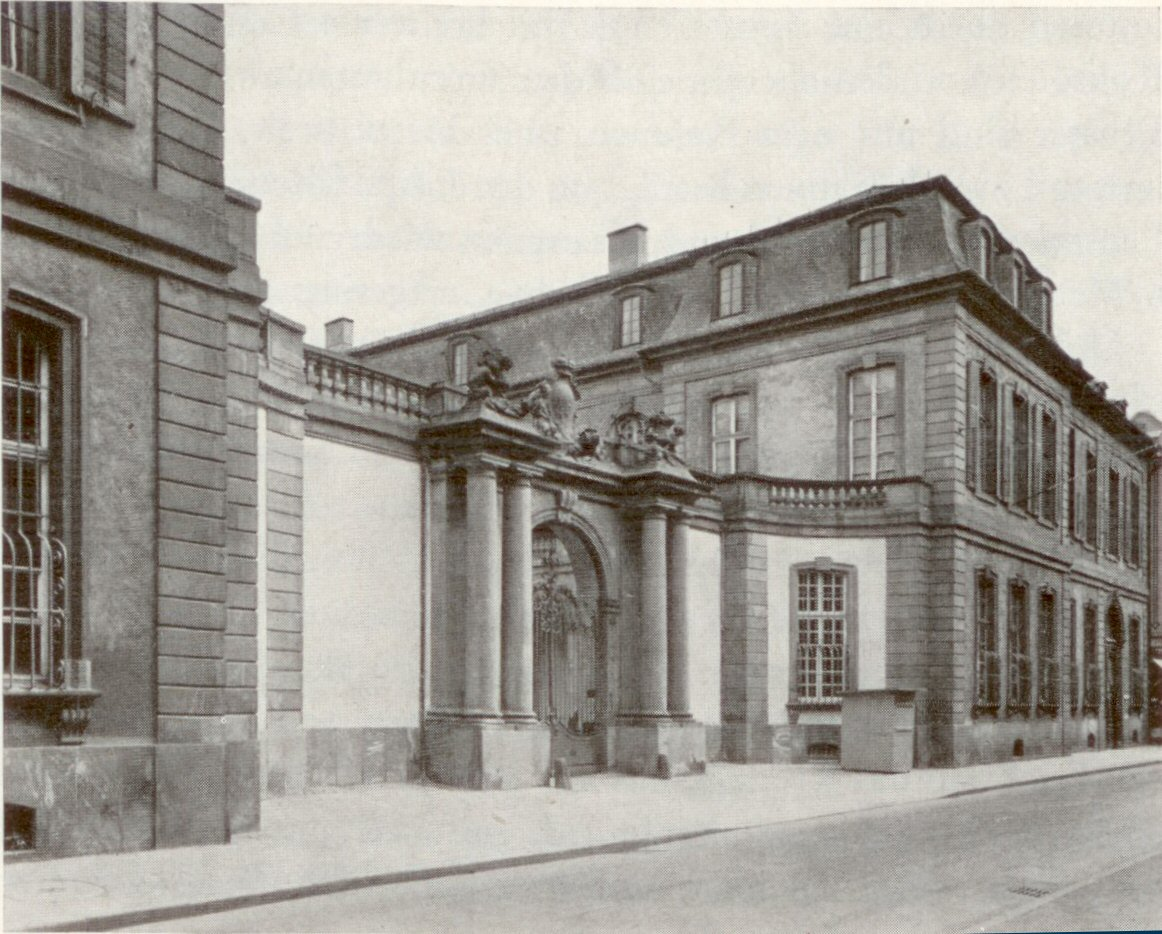
- Palais Thurn und Taxis, Frankfurt

Constitution
- Constitution of the German Confederation

Chart illustrating how the confederation worked

The Federal Convention (or Confederate Diet German: Bundesversammlung or Bundestag) was the only general joint institution of the German Confederation (German: Deutscher Bund) from 1815 until 1848, and from 1851 until 1866. The Federal Convention had its seat in the Palais Thurn und Taxis in Frankfurt. It was organized as a permanent congress of envoys of the member states.

== Origin ==
The German Confederation and its Diet came into existence as a result of the Congress of Vienna in 1815 after the defeat of Napoleon. The original task was to create a new constitutional structure for Germany after the dissolution of the Holy Roman Empire eight years before. The princes of the German states wanted to keep their sovereignty, therefore the German Confederation was created as a loose confederation of independent monarchist states, but included four free cities as well. The founding act was the German Federal Act of 8 June 1815 (German: Deutsche Bundesakte), which was part of the treaty of the Congress of Vienna.

== Composition ==
The Federal Convention was created as a permanent congress of envoys of all member states, which replaced the former imperial central power of the Holy Roman Empire. It took its seat at the Palais Thurn und Taxis in Frankfurt, where it met once a week after November 5, 1816.

The Convention was presided over by the Austrian delegate and consisted of two executive bodies: the inner council and the plenary session. Its members were not elected, neither by popular vote nor by state parliaments (which even didn't exist in some member states), but had been appointed by the state governments or by the state's prince.

The inner council consisted of 17 curias (one seat each for the 11 larger states, 5 seats for the 24 smaller states and one seat for the four free cities). The inner council determined the legislative agenda and decided which issues should be discussed by the plenary session. Decisions of the inner circle initially required an absolute majority, but in 1822 unanimous consent was required for all decisions to have force. The plenary session had 69 seats, according roughly to the state's sizes. The plenary session was involved especially in decisions regarding constitutional changes, which initially required a majority of two-thirds of the vote but was also changed to unanimous consent. The votes of the diet's members were distributed thus:

== Member states ==
State	Inner Council Curia	Plenary Total Votes
Austria	I	4
Prussia	II	4
Bavaria	III	4
Saxony	IV	4
Hanover	V	4
Württemberg	VI	4
Baden	VII	3
Electoral Hesse	VIII	3
Grand Duchy of Hesse	IX	3
/ Holstein and Lauenburg (including Duchy of Schleswig 1848-1851)	X	3
Luxembourg and Limburg (Limburg joined 1839)	XI	3
Saxe-Weimar-Eisenach	XII	1
Saxe-Coburg (became Duke of Saxe-Coburg and Gotha 1826)	XII	1
Saxe-Gotha (partitioned 1826)	XII	1
Saxe-Hildburghausen (ruler became Duke of Saxe-Altenburg 1826)	XII	1
Saxe-Meiningen	XII	1
Brunswick	XIII	2
Nassau	XIII	2
Mecklenburg-Schwerin	XIV	2
Mecklenburg-Strelitz	XIV	1
Oldenburg	XV	1
Anhalt-Bernburg (merged with Anhalt-Dessau 1863)	XV	1
Anhalt-Dessau	XV	1
Anhalt-Cöthen (merged with Anhalt-Dessau 1847)	XV	1
Schwarzburg-Rudolstadt	XV	1
Schwarzburg-Sondershausen	XV	1
Hohenzollern-Hechingen (merged with Prussia 1850)	XVI	1
Hohenzollern-Sigmaringen (merged with Prussia 1850)	XVI	1
Liechtenstein	XVI	1
Lippe-Detmold	XVI	1
Reuss, elder line	XVI	1
Reuss, younger line	XVI	1
Schaumburg-Lippe	XVI	1
Waldeck	XVI	1
Hesse-Homburg (joined 1820, merged with Grand Ducal Hesse 1866)	XVI	1
Bremen (joined 1820)	XVII	1
Frankfurt (joined 1820)	XVII	1
Hamburg (joined 1820)	XVII	1
Lübeck (joined 1820)	XVII	1

The decisions of the Convention had been mandatory for the member states, but the execution of those decisions remained under the control of each member state. As well, the member states remained fully sovereign regarding customs, police, and military.

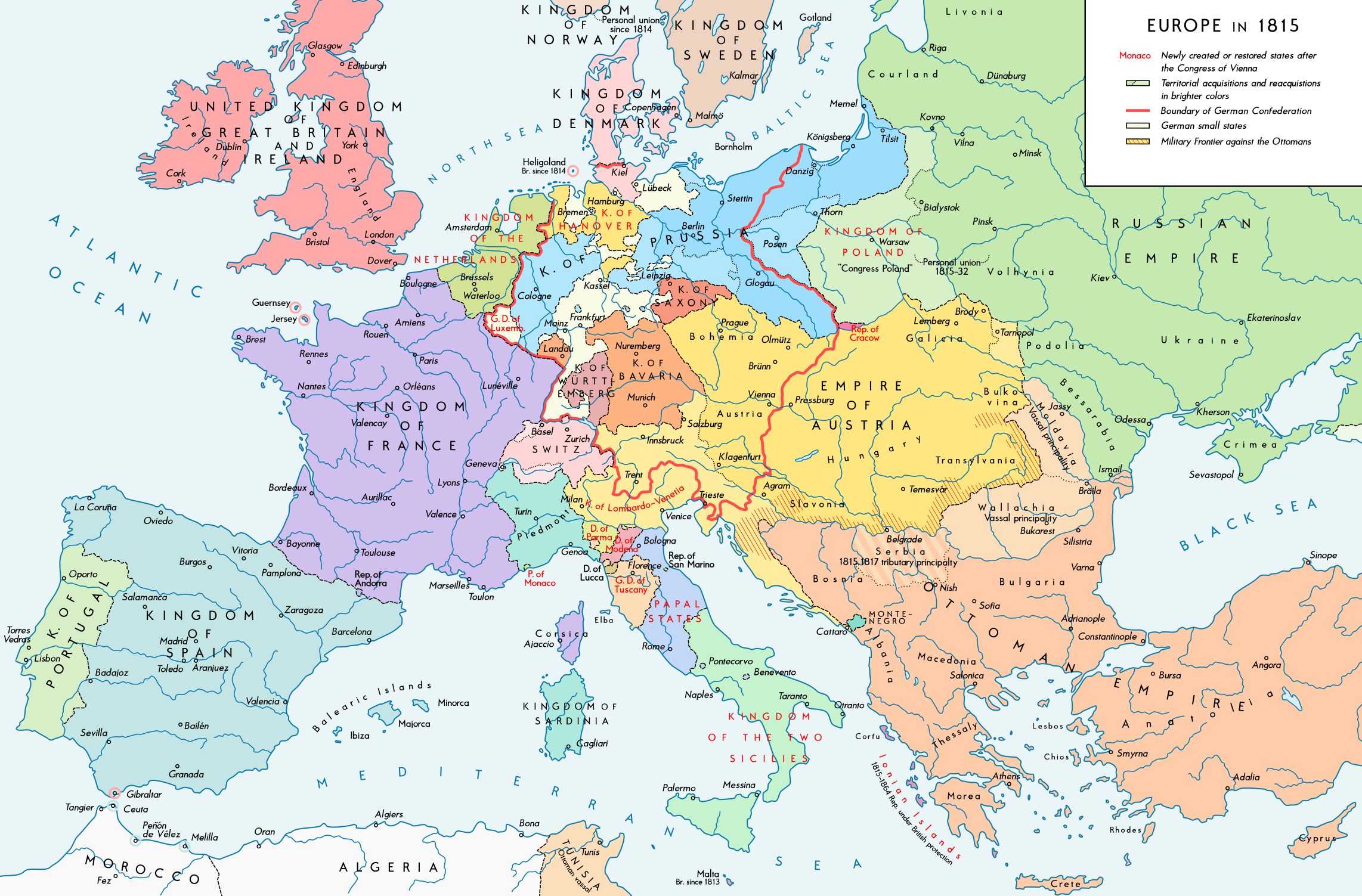
Power constellation in Europe after the Vienna Congress in 1815. In the center the German Confederation (German: Deutscher Bund)

== Development ==
Until the March Revolution of 1848 and again after 1851 the Federal Convention of the German Confederation was the main instrument of the reactionary forces of Germany to suppress democracy, liberalism and nationalism. For example, during 1835/36, the Federal Assembly decreed rules for censorship, which banned the works of Heinrich Heine and other authors in all states of the German Confederation.

After the March Revolution of 1848, the Convention was challenged by the newly formed National Assembly, which began its sittings in Frankfurt on 18 May 1848. On 28 June, the National Assembly decided to create a provisional government for all of Germany prior to the creation of a Constitution. On 29 June, they elected Archduke John of Austria to be the Regent of the Provisional Central Power.

At noon on 12 July 1848, the Convention handed over its responsibilities to the Regent and formally dissolved itself. The act lent legitimacy and, at least in theory, legally binding authority to the new office. However, the Regent refused to employ his powers and remained passive during this period. The National Assembly lost prestige and was closed on 19 June 1849. The Regent resigned his office on 20 December 1849, though not before transferring all responsibilities of the provisional government to Austria and Prussia on 30 September.

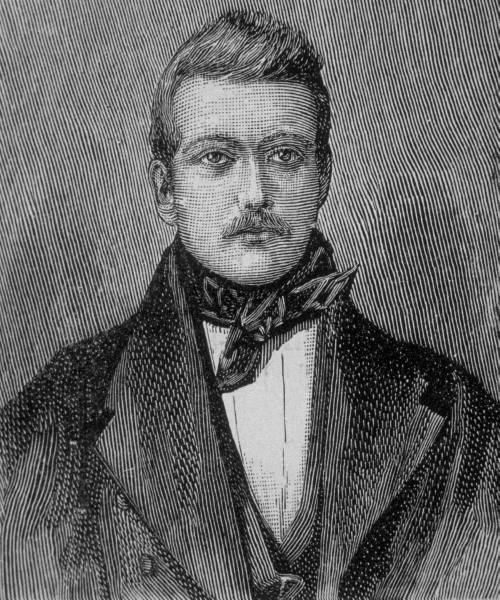
Otto von Bismarck (contemporary portrait) was one of the envoys for Prussia to the Federal Diet in Frankfurt from 1851 on

Prussia spent the next year challenging Austria's claims to supremacy in Germany, but on 30 November 1850 the Punctuation of Olmütz forced Prussia to abandon its proposal to alter Germany's political composition in its favor. By that time, all of the states in Germany had suppressed their Constitutions, popularly elected parliaments, and democratic clubs, thus erasing all work of the revolution. On 30 May 1851, the old Confederate Diet was reopened in the Thurn and Taxis Palace.

== Dissolution ==
The Federal Convention was dissolved after the Austro-Prussian War of 1866, the terms being laid down by the Peace of Prague (and preliminary peace treaty before) on 23 August 1866. Although the North German Confederation was legally not the successor of the German Confederation, the new Federal Council (or Bundesrat in German) could be seen as a kind of replacement for the Convention.

== Sources ==
- Translation of corresponding German Wikipedia article.
