= Historiography of the causes of World War I =

Area of study on origins of 1914–1918 conflict

Historians writing about the origins of World War I have differed over the relative emphasis they place upon the factors involved. Changes in historical arguments over time are in part related to the delayed availability of classified historical archives. The deepest distinction among historians remains between those who focus on the actions of Germany and Austria-Hungary as key and those who focus on a wider group of actors. Meanwhile, some historians, such as Fritz Fischer, maintain that Germany deliberately sought war while others do not. The main distinction among the latter is between those who believe that a war between the "Great Powers" was ultimately unplanned but still caused principally by Germany and Austria-Hungary taking risks, and those who believe that either all or some of the other powers, namely Russia, France, Serbia and Great Britain, played a more significant role in risking war than had been traditionally suggested. Given the catastrophic consequences of the war, and its far-reaching social, political and economic implications, the origins of the war, and in particular who "caused" the war, remain heated questions.

== Historiographic approach ==
Historiography avoids macrohistoric trends, comparisons, generalizations and theories. Professional historians focus on details. The debate over who is guilty for World War I remains heated and is questioned given the fact that World Wars had been theoretically explained and predicted before they happened, and the role of leaders was explicitly downgraded in favor of more fundamental historical forces: "The moment is close when the struggle for the domination of the world is going to take place... The struggle... of the future will not be the joy of kings or the caprices of peoples, but the necessary consequence of the needs of nations at crossroad."

== 1914–the Color books ==
As soon as the war began, the major nations issued "color books" containing documents (mostly from July 1914) that helped justify their actions. A color book is a collection of diplomatic correspondence and other official documents published by a government for educational or political reasons, and to promote the government position on current or past events. In wartime or times of crisis, they have especially been used as a propaganda vehicle, to justify governmental action, or to assign blame to foreign actors. The choice of what documents to include, how to present them, and even what order to list them, can make them tantamount to government-issued propaganda.

In the early 17th century, blue books first came into use in England as a means of publishing diplomatic correspondence and reports. They were so named, because of their blue cover. During the time of the Napoleonic Wars in the early 19th century, they were being published regularly. By the second half of the century, Turkey began publishing its own version in red, and the concept of color books spread to other countries in Europe, with each country using one color: Germany using white; France: yellow; red: Austria-Hungary (Spain also used red later, as did the Soviet Union); green: Italy; gray: Belgium; orange: Netherlands (and Tsarist Russia). This concept spread to the Americas as well, with the United States using red, Mexico: orange, and various countries in Central and South America using other colors; it even spread as far as China (yellow) and Japan (gray).

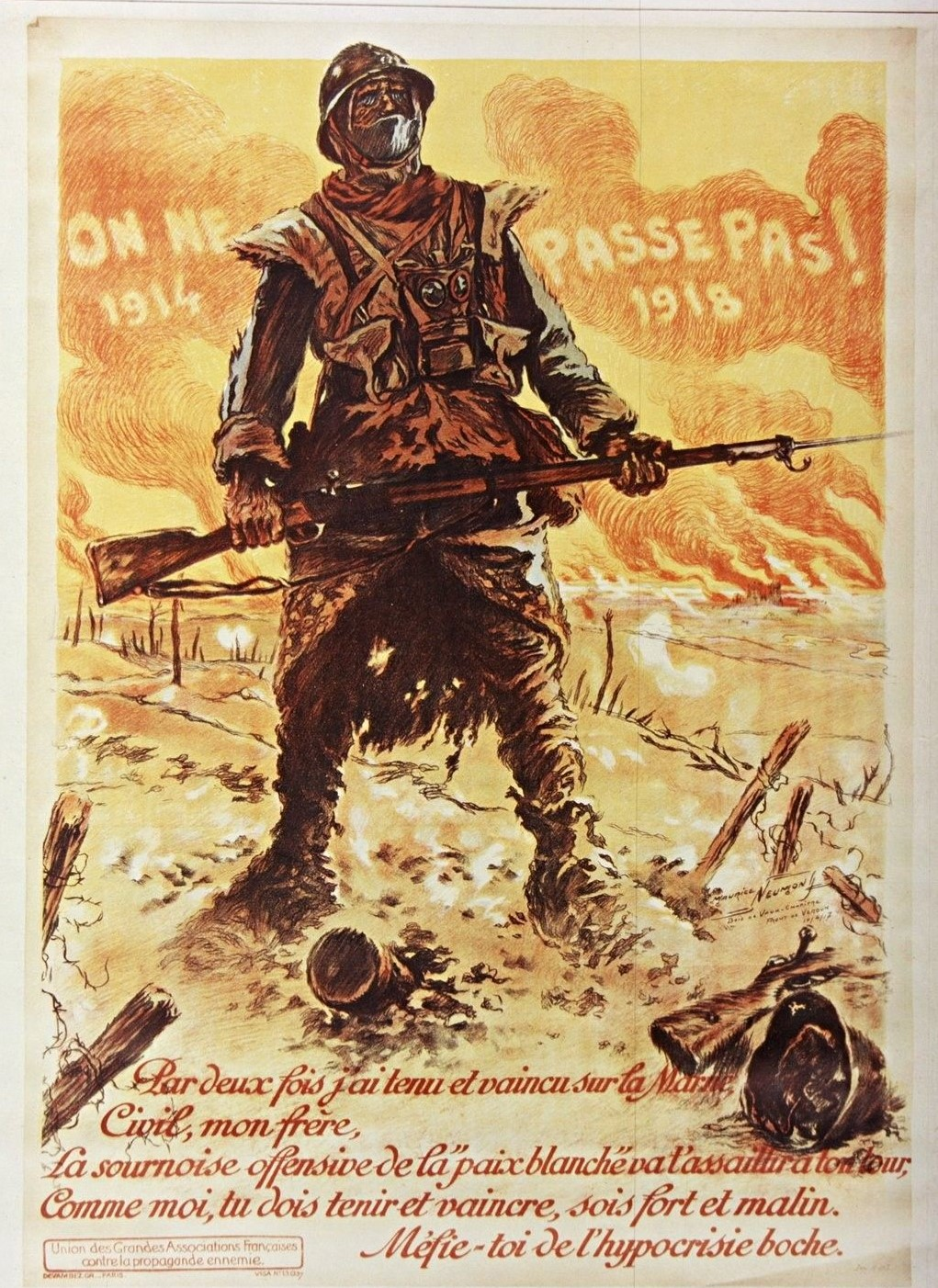
Poster, c. 1918 by Maurice Neumont

The German White Book (Note: German title of the White Book was: "Das Deutsche Weißbuch über den Ausbruch des deutsch-russisch-französischen Krieges" ("The German White Book about the Outbreak of the German-Russian-French War".)) appeared on 4 August 1914, and was the first such book to come out. It contains 36 documents. (Note: The German White Book was translated and published in English the same year.) Within a week, most other combatant countries had published their own book, each named with a different color name. France held off until 1 December 1914, when they finally published their Yellow Book. Other combatants in the war published similar books: the Blue Book of Britain, the Orange Book of Russia, the Yellow Book of France, and the Austro-Hungarian Red Book, the Belgian Grey Book, and the Serbian Blue Book.

The French Yellow Book (Livre Jaune), completed after three months of work, contained 164 documents. These works of propaganda aimed to convince public opinion of the validity of their rights. Unlike the others which were limited to the weeks before the start of the war, the Yellow Book included some documents from 1913, putting Germany in a bad light by shedding light on their mobilization for a European war. Some of the documents in the Yellow Book were challenged by Germany as not genuine, but their objections were mostly ignored, and the Yellow Book was widely cited as a resource in the July crisis of 1914.

It turned out after the war was over, that the Yellow Book wasn't complete, or entirely accurate. Historians who gained access to previously unpublished French material were able to use it in their report to the Senate entitled "Origins and responsibilities for the Great War" (Note: French: "Les origines et les responsabilités de la grande guerre") as did ex-President Raymond Poincaré. The conclusion set forth in the report of the 1919 French Peace Commission is illustrative of the two-pronged goals of blaming their opponents while justifying their own actions, as laid out in two sentences:

The war was premeditated by the Central Powers, as well as by their Allies Turkey and Bulgaria, and is the result of acts deliberately committed with the intention of making it inevitable.
Germany, in concordance with Austria-Hungary, worked deliberately to have the many conciliatory proposals of the Entente Powers set aside, and their efforts to avoid war nullified.

— Peace Conference Commission on the Responsibility of the Authors of the War and on Enforcement of Penalties

Later, publication of complete archives from the period of the July crisis by Germany, Britain, and Austria, as well as some from Soviet archives, revealed some truths that the Yellow Book conveniently left out. In particular, was Yellow Book document #118, which showed a Russian mobilization in response to Austrian mobilization the day before on 30 July, but in fact, the order of mobilization was reversed; Russia mobilized first. After a contorted explanation by Quai d'Orsay, confidence in the Yellow Book was ruined, and historians avoided using it.

In his essay for the April 1937 issue of Foreign Affairs, Bernadotte E. Schmitt examined recently published diplomatic correspondence in the Documents Diplomatiques Français and compared it to the documents in the French Yellow Book published in 1914, concluding that the Yellow Book "was neither complete nor entirely reliable" and went into some detail in examining documents either missing from the Yellow Book, or presented out of order to confuse or mislead the sequence in which events occurred. He concluded,

The documents will not change existing views to any great extent. They will not establish the innocence of France in the minds of Germans. On the other hand, the French will be able to find in them a justification of the policy they pursued in July 1914; and in spite of Herr Hitler's recent declaration repudiating Article 231 of the Treaty of Versailles, they will continue, on the basis of these documents, to hold Germany primarily responsible for the Great War.

— France and the Outbreak of the World War

In the German White Book, anything that could benefit the Russian position was redacted.

== 1918–1930s ==
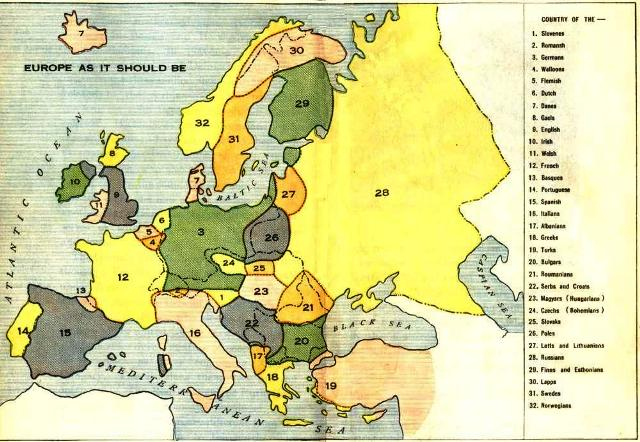
Louis P. Bénézet's map of "Europe As It Should Be" (1918), depicting nations based on ethnic and linguistic criteria. Bénézet's book The World War and What was Behind It (1918) blamed on German aggression combined with perceived threats to the traditional social order from radicals and ethnic nationalists.

Straight after the war Allied historians argued that Germany was solely responsible for the start of the war: a view reinforced by the inclusion of 'war guilt' clauses within the Treaty of Versailles.

In 1919, the German diplomat and former Chancellor Bernhard von Bülow went through the German archives to suppress any documents that might show that Germany was responsible for the war and to ensure that only documents that were exculpatory (favorable to the defendant, in this case, Germany) might be seen by historians. As a result of Bülow's efforts, between 1923 and 1927 the German Foreign Ministry published forty volumes of documents, which as the German-Canadian historian Holger Herwig noted were carefully edited to promote the idea that the war was not the fault of one nation but were rather the result of the breakdown of international relations. Certain documents such as some of the papers of the Chancellor Theobald von Bethmann Hollweg which did not support this interpretation were destroyed. Hermann Kantorowicz, one of the few German historians who argued in the 1920s that Germany was responsible for the war, found that the Foreign Ministry went out of its way to stop his work from being published and tried to have him fired from his post at Kiel University. After 1933, Kantorowicz who as a Jewish German would have been banned from publishing, was forced to leave Germany for his "unpatriotic" writings. With the exceptions of the work of scholars such as Kantorowicz, Herwig has concluded that the majority of the work published on the subject of World War I's origins in Germany prior to Fritz Fischer's book Griff nach der Weltmacht was little more than a pseudo-historical "sham".

Academic work in the English-speaking world in the later 1920s and 1930s, blamed the participants more or less equally. In the early 1920s, several American historians opposed to the terms of the Treaty of Versailles such as Sidney Bradshaw Fay, Charles A. Beard and Harry Elmer Barnes produced works that claimed that Germany was not responsible for war. Article 231 of the Treaty of Versailles, which had seemingly assigned all responsibility for the war to Germany and thus justified the Allied claim to reparations, was invalid. A feature of American "revisionist" historians of the 1920s was a tendency to treat Germany as a victim of the war and the Allies as the aggressors. The objective of Fay and Barnes was to put an end to reparations imposed on Germany, by attempting to prove what they regarded as the moral invalidity of Article 231. The exiled Wilhelm praised Barnes upon meeting him in 1926. According to Barnes, Wilhelm "was happy to know that I did not blame him for starting the war in 1914. He disagreed with my view that Russia and France were chiefly responsible. He held that the villains of 1914 were the international Jews and Free Masons who, he alleged, desired to destroy national states and the Christian religion."

The German Foreign Ministry lavished special "care" upon the efforts of both Fay and Barnes with generous use of the German archives, and in the case of Barnes, research funds provided by the German government. The German government liked Fay's The Origin of the War so much that it purchased hundreds of copies in various languages to hand out for free at German embassies and consulates. The German government allowed books that were pro-German in their interpretation, such as Barnes's The Genesis of the World War, to be translated into German while books such as Bernadotte Schmitt's The Coming of War 1914 that were critical of German actions in 1914, were not permitted to be published in Germany.

Chapter 10 of Wilhelm II's Memoirs is entitled "The Outbreak of War". In it the Kaiser lists twelve "proofs" from the more extensive "Comparative Historical Tables" that he had compiled, which demonstrate the preparations for war by the Entente Powers made in the spring and summer of 1914. In particular he alleged:

(5) According to the memoirs of the French Ambassador at St. Petersburg, M. Paléologue, published in 1921 in the Revue des Deux Mondes, the Grand Duchesses Anastasia and Militza told him, on July 22, 1914, at Tsarskoe Selo, that their father, the King of Montenegro, had informed them in a cipher telegram, "we shall have war before the end of the month [that is, before the 13th of August, Russian style] ... nothing will be left of Austria. ... You will take Alsace-Lorraine. ... Our armies will meet at Berlin. ... Germany will be annihilated."

In a different approach, Lenin in his pamphlet Imperialism: the Highest Stage of Capitalism portrayed the war as imperialist, caused by rivalries triggered by highly organised financial monopolies, that by frenzied competition for markets and raw materials, had inevitably brought about the war. Evidence of secret deals between the Tsar and British and French governments to split the spoils of war was released by the Soviets in 1917–18. In the 1920s and 1930s, more socialist works built on this theme, a line of analysis which is still to be found, although vigorously disputed on the grounds that wars occurred before the capitalist era. Lenin argued that the private ownership of the means of production, in the hands of a limited number of capitalist monopolies, would inevitably lead to war. He identified railways as a 'summation' of the basic capitalist industries, coal, iron and steel and that their uneven development summed up capitalist development.

The National Socialist approach to the question of the war's origins were summed up in a pamphlet entitled Deutschkunde uber Volk, Staat, Leibesubungen. In 1935, the British ambassador to Germany, Sir Eric Phipps, summed up the contents of Deutschkunde uber Volk, Staat, Leibesubungen which described the origins of the war thus:

"Not Germany, but England, France and Russia prepared for war soon after the death of Bismarck. But Germany has also guilt to bear. She could have prevented the world war on three fronts, if she had not waited so long. The opportunity presented itself often—against England in the Boer War, against Russia when she was engaged against Japan... That she did not do so is Germany's guilt, though a proof that she was peaceful and wanted no war."

In the inter-war period, various factors such as the network of secret alliances, emphasis on speed of offence, rigid military planning, Darwinian ideas and a lack of resolution mechanisms were blamed by many historians. These ideas have maintained some currency since then. Famous proponents include Joachim Remak and Paul Kennedy. At the same time, many one-sided works were produced by politicians and other participants, often trying to exculpate themselves. In Germany these tended to deflect blame, while in Allied countries they tended to blame Germany or Austria-Hungary.

== The Fischer thesis ==
In 1961, the German historian Fritz Fischer published the controversial Griff nach der Weltmacht, in which Fischer argued that the German government had an expansionist foreign policy, formulated in the aftermath of Social Democratic gains in the election of 1912 and had started a war of aggression in 1914. Fischer was the first historian to have full access to the entire remaining German World War I archives. Previous historians had only been able to access heavily edited archives that had been created in order to support the view that war was the inevitable product of the breakdown of international diplomacy, rather than the end result of German expansionist ambitions.

He was the first to draw attention to the War Council chaired by the Kaiser Wilhelm II and the top military-naval leadership of the Reich on December 8, 1912, in which it was declared that Germany would start a war of aggression in the summer of 1914. The Kaiser and the Army leadership wanted to start a war at once in December 1912, but heeded objections from Grand Admiral Alfred von Tirpitz, who supported the idea of starting a war but argued that the German Navy needed more time to prepare and asked that the war be put off until the summer of 1914. The Kaiser agreed to Tirpitz's request. In 1973, the British historian John Röhl noted that in view of what Fischer had uncovered, especially the War Council meeting of December 8, 1912, that the idea that Germany bore the main responsibility for the war was no longer denied by the vast majority of historians, although Fischer later denied claiming that the war was decided upon at that meeting. Annika Mombauer in contrast to Röhl observed in her work on Helmuth von Moltke that despite a great deal of research and debate "there is no direct evidence to prove that military decision-makers understood December 1912 as a decisive moment at which a future war had been agreed upon".

Fischer's discovery of Imperial German government documents prepared after the war began, calling for the ethnic cleansing of Russian Poland and German colonization to provide Germany with Lebensraum (living space) as a war aim, has also led to the widespread acceptance by historians of continuity between the foreign policies of Germany in 1914 and 1939.

Fischer alleged the German government hoped to use external expansion and aggression to check internal dissent and democratization. Some of his work is based on Theobald von Bethmann Hollweg's Septemberprogramm which laid out Germany's war aims. Controversially, Fischer asserted a version of the Sonderweg thesis that drew a connection between aggression in 1914 and 1939. Fischer was later to call Bethmann Hollweg the "Hitler of 1914". Fischer prompted the Primat der Innenpolitik ("primacy of domestic politics") school, emphasizing domestic German political factors. Some prominent scholars in this school include Imanuel Geiss, Hans-Ulrich Wehler, Wolfgang Mommsen and Volker Berghahn.

In a major 2011 conference entitled "the Fischer Controversy 50 Years On", a group of historians and academics debated the legacy of Fischer's work. The conclusion was that "...a consensus emerged that Fischer had got it right in attributing 'a significant part of the historical responsibility for the outbreak of a general war' to Germany and that Fischer's thesis of the continuity of German war aims still stands fifty years later." Yet by August 2014, many new books had appeared which by their divergent views collectively continue the controversy.

=== Opposition to the Fischer thesis ===
The "Berlin War Party" thesis and variants of it, blaming domestic German political factors, became something of an orthodoxy in the years after publication. Nonetheless, many authors have attacked it. German conservative historians such as Gerhard Ritter asserted that the thesis was dishonest and inaccurate.

Ritter promoted the idea that Germany displayed the same traits as other countries and could not be singled out. In a 1962 essay, Ritter contended that Germany's principal goal in 1914 was to maintain Austria-Hungary as a great power, and thus German foreign policy was largely defensive as opposed to Fischer's claim that it was mostly aggressive. Ritter claimed that Fischer attached unwarranted significance to the highly bellicose advice about waging a "preventive war" in the Balkans offered in July 1914 to the Chief of Cabinet of the Austro-Hungarian foreign ministry, Count Alexander Hoyos, by the German journalist Viktor Naumann. Ritter charged that Naumann was speaking as a private individual and not as Fischer claimed on behalf of the German government. Ritter felt that Fischer had been dishonest in his portrayal of Austro-German relations in July 1914. Ritter charged that it was not true that Germany had pressured a reluctant Austria-Hungary into attacking Serbia. Ritter argued that the main impetus for war within Austria-Hungary was internal, and though there were divisions of opinion about the course to pursue in Vienna and Budapest, it was not German pressure that led to war being chosen. In Ritter's opinion, the most Germany can be criticized for in July 1914 was a mistaken evaluation of the state of European power politics. Ritter claimed that the German government had underrated the state of military readiness in Russia and France, falsely assumed that British foreign policy was more pacific than what it really was, overrated the sense of moral outrage caused by the assassination of Archduke Franz Ferdinand on European opinion, and above all, overestimated the military power and political common sense of Austria-Hungary. Ritter felt that in retrospect it was not necessary from the German point of view to maintain Austria-Hungary as a great power but claimed that at the time most Germans regarded the Dual Monarchy as a "brother empire" and viewed the prospect of the Balkans being in the Russian sphere of influence as an unacceptable threat. Ritter argued that though the Germans supported the idea of an Austrian-Hungarian invasion of Serbia, this was more of an ad hoc response to the crisis gripping Europe as opposed to Fischer's claim that Germany was deliberately setting off a war of aggression. Ritter complained that Fischer relied too much on the memories of Austro-Hungarian leaders such as the Count István Tisza and Count Ottokar Czernin who sought to shift all of the responsibility for the war on German shoulders. Ritter ended his essay by writing he felt profound "sadness" over the prospect that the next generation of Germans would not be as nationalistically minded as previous generations as a result of reading Fischer.

Fischer argued that in private, Ritter admitted that some evidence supported Fischer on some points. In a letter to Hans Rothfels on March 26, 1962, before publishing an article attacking Fischer, Ritter wrote:

"I am alarmed and dismayed by your letter of 21 March. If Bethmann, as you write, in July 1914 had the 'desire' [Wunsch] to bring about war with Russia, then either he played without conscience with the fate of the German people, or he had simply incredible illusions about our military capablilities. In any case, Fischer would then be completely in the right when he denies that Bethmann seriously wanted to avoid war...If what in your view, Riezler's diary reveals is correct, I would have to discard my article, instead of publishing it...In any case we are dealing here with a most ominous [unheimlichen] state secret, and all historical perspectives are displaced [verschieben sich], since...Bethmann Hollweg's September Program then appears in a wholly different light".

Trachtenberg concluded in 1991:

It is certainly not true, however, that the views of the Fischer school have come to be almost universally shared, either inside Germany or out. The older interpretations of people like Pierre Renouvin, Bernadotte Schmitt, and Luigi Albertini--which, while quite critical of Germany, never went so far as to claim that the German government deliberately set out to provoke a general war--are still very widely accepted.

== 1960s–1990s ==
In the 1960s two theories emerged to explain the causes of World War I. One championed by the West German historian Andreas Hillgruber argued that in 1914, a "calculated risk" on the part of Berlin had gone awry. Hillgruber argued that what the Imperial German government had attempted to do in 1914 was to break the informal Triple Entente of Russia, France and Britain by encouraging Austria-Hungary to invade Serbia and thus provoke a crisis in an area that would concern only St. Petersburg. Hillgruber argued that the Germans hoped that both Paris and London would decide the crisis in the Balkans did not concern them and that lack of Anglo-French support would lead the Russians to reach an understanding with Germany. Hillgruber argued that when the Austrian attack on Serbia caused Russia to mobilize instead of backing down, the German Chancellor Theobald von Bethmann Hollweg under strong pressure from a hawkish General Staff led by General Moltke the Younger panicked and ordered the Schlieffen Plan to be activated, thus leading to a German attack on France. In Hillgruber's opinion the German government had pursued a high-risk diplomatic strategy of provoking a war in the Balkans that had inadvertently caused a world war.

Another theory was A. J. P. Taylor's "Railway Thesis" in his 1969 book War by Timetable. In Taylor's opinion, none of the great powers wanted a war but all of the great powers wished to increase their power relative to the others. Taylor argued that by engaging in an arms race and having the general staffs develop elaborate railway timetables for mobilization, the continental powers hoped to develop a deterrent that would lead to other powers seeing the risk of war as too dangerous. When the crisis began in the summer of 1914, the need to mobilize faster than potential opponents made the leaders of 1914 prisoners of their logistics. The railway timetables forced invasion (of Belgium from Germany) as an unavoidable physical and logistical consequence of German mobilization. Taylor argued that the mobilization that was meant to serve as a threat and deterrent to war instead relentlessly caused a world war by forcing invasion.

Other authors, such as the American Marxist historian Arno J. Mayer in 1967, agreed with some aspects of the "Berlin War Party" theory but felt that what Fischer said applied to all European states. In a 1967 essay "The Primacy of Domestic Politics", Mayer made a Primat der Innenpolitik ("primacy of domestic politics") argument for the war's origins. Mayer rejected the traditional Primat der Außenpolitik ("primacy of foreign politics") argument of diplomatic history, because it failed to take into account that all of the major European countries were in a "revolutionary situation" in 1914. In Mayer's opinion, in 1914 Britain was on the verge of civil war and massive industrial unrest, Italy had been rocked by the Red Week of June 1914, France and Germany were faced with ever-increasing political strife, Russia was facing a huge strike wave, and Austria-Hungary was confronted with rising ethnic and class tensions. Mayer insists that liberalism was disintegrating in face of the challenge from the extreme right and left in Britain, France and Italy, while being a non-existent force in Germany, Austria-Hungary and Russia. Mayer ended his essay by arguing that World War I should be best understood as a pre-emptive "counterrevolutionary" strike by ruling elites in Europe to preserve their power.

In a 1972 essay "World War I As a Galloping Gertie", the American historian Paul W. Schroeder blamed Britain for the First World War. Schroeder argued that the war was a "Galloping Gertie", that it got out of control, sucking the Great Powers into an unwanted war. Schroeder thought that the key to the European situation was what he claimed was Britain's "encirclement" policy directed at Austria-Hungary. Schroeder argued that British foreign policy was anti-German and even more anti-Austrian. Schroeder argued that because Britain never took Austria-Hungary seriously, it was British policy to always force concessions on the Dual Monarchy with no regard to the balance of power in Central Europe. Schroeder claimed that 1914 was a "preventive war" forced on Germany to maintain Austria as a power, which was faced with a crippling British "encirclement policy" aimed at the break-up of that state.

The American historian Samuel R. Williamson Jr., lays most of the blame with the Austro-Hungarian elites rather than the Germans in his 1990 book, Austria-Hungary and the Origins of the First World War. Another recent work is Niall Ferguson's The Pity of War which rejects the Fischer thesis, laying most of the blame on diplomatic bumbling from the British. Ferguson echoes Hillgruber in asserting that the German government attempted to use the crisis to split the Entente.

== Post-2000 ==
According to Annika Mombauer in 2015, a new consensus among scholars had emerged by the 1980s, mainly as a result of Fischer's intervention:

Few historians agreed wholly with his [Fischer's] thesis of a premeditated war to achieve aggressive foreign policy aims, but it was generally accepted that Germany's share of responsibility was larger than that of the other great powers.

Regarding historians inside Germany, she adds that by the 1990s, "There was 'a far-reaching consensus about the special responsibility of the German Reich' in the writings of leading historians, though they differed in how they weighted Germany's role.

=== Europe's Last Summer ===
American historian David Fromkin has blamed elements in the military leadership of Germany and Austria-Hungary in his 2004 book Europe's Last Summer. Fromkin's thesis is that there were two war plans; a first formulated by Austria-Hungary and the German Chancellor to start a war with Serbia to reinvigorate a fading Austro-Hungarian Empire; the second secret plan was that of the German military leadership to provoke a wider war with France and Russia. He thought that the German military leadership, in the midst of a European arms race, believed that they would be unable to further expand the German army without extending the officer corps beyond the traditional Prussian aristocracy. Rather than allowing that to happen, they manipulated Austria-Hungary into starting a war with Serbia in the expectation that Russia would intervene, giving Germany a pretext to launch what was in essence a preventive war. Part of his thesis is that the German military leadership were convinced that by 1916–18, Germany would be too weak to win a war with France, England and Russia. Notably, Fromkin suggests that part of the war plan was the exclusion of Kaiser Wilhelm II from knowledge of the events, because the Kaiser was regarded by the German General Staff as inclined to resolve crises short of war. Fromkin also argues that in all countries but particularly Germany and Austria documents were widely destroyed or forged to distort the origins of the war.

=== The Sleepwalkers: How Europe Went to War in 1914 ===
Christopher Clark's 2013 book The Sleepwalkers: How Europe Went to War in 1914 refocused the origins back to the Balkans and sought to redistribute agency back to the diplomats. He also sought to distribute responsibility to all of the Great Powers, paying particular attention to Germany, Austria-Hungary, France and Russia. Clark argues that the Germanic powers sought a localised war to punish Serbia, but in doing so knowingly risked war with Russia. For its part Russia accepted the risk of war by upsetting the balance of power in the Balkans in 1912–13, encouraging anti-Austrian irredentism, and deciding to support Serbia come what may. France did not restrain Russia, positively encouraging her to face down the Germans and support Serbia in 1914. Clark concludes that while all the continental powers risked a general war, none sought that war.

Clark notes the speed of the crisis rendered diplomacy futile: "German efforts at mediation – which suggested that Austria should "Halt in Belgrade" and use the occupation of the Serbian capital to ensure its terms were met – were rendered futile by the speed of Russian preparations, which threatened to force the Germans to take counter–measures before mediation could begin to take effect".

Furthermore, while Clark does not seek to place responsibility on Russia alone, he places more emphasis on Russian actions than many previous historians, stating: "Yes, the Germans declared war on Russia before the Russians declared war on Germany. But by the time that happened, the Russian government had been moving troops and equipment to the German front for a week. The Russians were the first great power to issue an order of general mobilisation and the first Russo-German clash took place on German, not on Russian soil, following the Russian invasion of East Prussia. That doesn't mean that the Russians should be 'blamed' for the outbreak of war. Rather it alerts us to the complexity of the events that brought war about and the limitations of any thesis that focuses on the culpability of one actor."

The book challenges the imputation, hitherto widely accepted by mainstream scholars since 1919, of a peculiar "war guilt" on the part of the German Empire, instead mapping carefully the complex mechanism of events and misjudgements that led to war. There was, in 1914, nothing inevitable about it. Risks inherent in the strategies pursued by the various governments involved had been taken before without catastrophic consequences: this now enabled leaders to follow similar approaches while not adequately evaluating or recognising those risks. Among international experts many saw this presentation by Clark of his research and insights as groundbreaking.

==== Reception in Germany ====
In Germany itself, where the book received much critical attention, reactions were not all positive. Volker Ullrich contended that Clark's analysis largely disregards the pressure for war coming from Germany's powerful military establishment. According to Hans-Ulrich Wehler, Clark had diligently researched the sources covering the war's causes from the German side only to "eliminate [many of them] with bewildering one-sidedness" ("verblüffend einseitig eliminiert"). Warming to his theme, Wehler attributed the sales success of the book in Germany to a "deep seated need [on the part of German readers], no longer so constrained by the taboos characteristic of the later twentieth century, to free themselves from the burdensome allegations of national war guilt".

==== Vernon Bogdanor ====
Vernon Bogdanor has criticized Clark for downplaying the German and Austrian refusal of offers of mediation. Over the course of the July Crisis Sir Edward Grey, British Foreign Secretary, offered a four-power conference of the Great Powers to help mediate the conflict. Clark dismisses Grey's attempts as "half-hearted" and founded on a "partisan indifference to the power-political realities of Austro-Hungary's situation".

Russia accepted the four power conference proposal but Austria-Hungary rejected the proposal. Germany also rejected the proposal on the grounds that they believed only Germany would support their ally. Bogdanor believes the Germans were mistaken. "That's mistaken. I think Grey would have taken the Austrian side and would have said concessions were needed by Serbia to keep the peace...and it would have been very difficult for the Russians not to go along with that." The Russians further proposed that the conflict be subject to the court of arbitration in the Hague but this too was rejected by Germany and Austria-Hungary. To Bogdanor the rejection of the options of the four power conference and the court of arbitration weigh heavily against Germany and Austria-Hungary when looking for the causes of the war.

==== Mombauer on Clark's thesis ====
Annika Mombauer directly challenges Christopher Clark's "sleepwalker" thesis, rejecting his portrayal of July 1914 decision-makers as unaware or passive. She argues that Clark's framing leads to a problematic "relativization of responsibility" that obscures the conscious and deliberate decisions made in Berlin and Vienna to pursue war rather than diplomacy. While acknowledging that multiple governments contributed to the crisis, Mombauer emphasizes that the principal impetus for war came from Austria-Hungary and Germany, and insists on the importance of recognizing degrees of responsibility.

=== The Russian Origins of the First World War and July 1914 ===
Sean McMeekin, in his books The Russian Origins of the First World War and July 1914, also places more emphasis on Russian actions and in particular Russian Foreign Minister Sergey Sazonov's bellicosity and duplicity. McMeekin argues that Russia's Balkan policy, and crucial support for Serbia, only make sense in the context of her wider strategic desire to control or capture Constantinople and the Straits from the ailing Ottomans. This is similar to the Russians' plan during the Bosnian Crisis of 1908 in which they had also wanted to gain the Straits around the area. Furthermore, Russia's foreign policy of gaining these Straits were the same during the Balkan Wars. He further argues that during the July crisis Sazonov must have known that Russia's partial mobilisation would inevitably lead to general mobilisation and likely war. Moreover, he highlights that Sazonov deliberately lied to the British about Russia's mobilisation, rendering the British unable to restrain their entente partner through ignorance of the advanced state of their military preparations.

=== The War That Ended Peace ===
Margaret MacMillan, in her book, The War That Ended Peace, puts the blame for the start of the First World War on the decision making of a small group of people, primarily blaming the leaders of Russia, Germany and Austria-Hungary. The Russians did not want to back down after mobilizing, due to the fast mobilization that they had ordered. German leaders were also to blame due to their issuance of the Blank Cheque to Austria-Hungary during the July Crisis, which pushed Austria-Hungary into going to war with Serbia. Finally, the leaders of Austria-Hungary were culpable for planning to invade Serbia after the Assassination of Archduke Franz Ferdinand.

=== The Origins of the First World War ===
Historian William Mulligan, in his book, The Origins of the First World War, believes that the First World War had started due to the fall of international relations which had then led to various empires around the continent feeling threatened which had then led to poor decision making. European powers had weakened due to crisis such as the Bosnian Crisis and the two crises in Morocco which happened as a result of the weakening power in the Ottoman Empire in the area. Mulligan believes that an arms race was facilitated due to the powers becoming weaker and this arms race led to even more fear and instability. All this fear and instability then exploded in the July Crisis and poor decisions were made because European powers believed that the power of their countries were at stake.

=== Other views ===
Alexander Anievas also puts the blame of the start of the First World War on the decline of relations between the European powers in the article "1914 In World Historical Perspective: The Uneven and Combined Origins of World War I". Anievas believes that countries in Europe such as Germany and Russia had tried to bolster their empires due to the collapse of influence from the Ottoman Empire in the Balkans region of Europe. In this attempt, major crises such as those in Bosnia and Morocco broke out These crises brought further problems on the European stage. For example, due to the Bosnian Crisis, Russia had now suffered a major embarrassment on the world stage; their relationship with Austria-Hungary worsened and Russia ordered an early mobilization during the July Crisis. Furthermore, with the nation of Germany, the crisis that had occurred in Morocco led to worse relations between Germany and other major European countries. The Germans felt threatened; they began to build up their weapons which in turn led to Russia re-arming too.

British historian Alexander Watson quotes Austro-Hungarian noble, Baron Leopold von Andrian-Werburg, in assigning Austria-Hungary the bulk of the blame for rash decisions during the July Crisis: "We began the war, not the Germans and still less the Entente — that I know." Watson argues that Austro-Hungarian leaders, eager to assert dominance over the irascible Serbia, were exceptional among the great powers in that "they alone actively planned from early July 1914 to take their country to war." Holger H. Herwig takes a similar position, arguing that the onset of the Great War was a result of calculated decisions by Austria-Hungary, to the extent that "In fact, Berchtold throughout July was most reluctant to share information with Berlin for fear that the latter might apply the brakes and seek a last-minute diplomatic resolution to the crisis." In his view, "Vienna first resolved for war, sought German assurances, and then exploited them once received."

Political scientists Richard N. Lebow and Thomas Lindemann argue that the First World War broke out partly due to ideas about Social Darwinism. Austrians felt that Serbians, as Slavs, were inferior to Austrian-Hungarians and Germans, so it was legitimate to make Serbian territory part of Germanic empires.

== Synoptic table ==
Major interpretations of the causes of the First World War, by date of original publication
| Historian | Principal work | School | Locus of responsibility | Thesis |
|---|---|---|---|---|
| Harry Elmer Barnes | The Genesis of the World War (1926) | American revisionism | Serbia, Russia, France | Argued that the Entente powers, above all Russia and France, bore principal responsibility and that Germany and Austria-Hungary acted defensively. Wrote explicitly to dismantle the war-guilt clause of the Versailles Treaty. |
| Sidney B. Fay | The Origins of the World War (1928) | Weimar-era revisionism | Diffuse; weighted toward Serbia, Russia, Austria-Hungary | Denied that any government desired a European war in 1914 and attributed the outcome to the alliance system and militarism. Placed heavier weight on Belgrade, St Petersburg and Vienna than on Berlin. |
| Bernadotte Schmitt | The Coming of the War, 1914 (1930) | Orthodox | Germany and Austria-Hungary | Defended the Versailles verdict against Fay and Barnes through a documentary reconstruction of the July Crisis. Held that Berlin's backing of Vienna turned a Balkan crisis into a European war. |
| Luigi Albertini | Le origini della guerra del 1914 (1942–43) | Documentary / diplomatic | Vienna and Berlin chiefly; Russia and Serbia also censured | Reconstructed the crisis from documents and interviews with surviving principals. Treated the German "blank check" as decisive without exculpating St Petersburg or Belgrade. |
| Gerhard Ritter | Staatskunst und Kriegshandwerk (1954–68; Eng. The Sword and the Scepter, 1969–73) | Conservative-nationalist | Diffuse; German fault lay in militarism overriding statecraft | Rejected the Fischer thesis while conceding Bethmann Hollweg's gamble in July. Located the German failure in the subordination of political judgment to military planning. |
| Fritz Fischer | Griff nach der Weltmacht (1961; Eng. Germany's Aims in the First World War, 1967) | Fischer thesis | Germany | Argued that the German leadership deliberately risked a continental war in July 1914 in pursuit of aims later codified in the September Program. Developed the July argument further in Krieg der Illusionen (1969). |
| Imanuel Geiss | Julikrise und Kriegsausbruch 1914 (1963–64); Der lange Weg in die Katastrophe (1990) | Fischer school | Germany | Supported Fischer's thesis, first through a document collection and later in an interpretive synthesis. Stressed the role of the military and the elite's decision-making under pressure. |
| Arno J. Mayer | "Domestic Causes of the First World War" (1967); The Persistence of the Old Regime (1981) | Primat der Innenpolitik | European elites generally; most acutely the central empires | Argued that threatened ruling classes used an aggressive foreign policy to contain domestic challenge. The 1967 essay appeared in Krieger and Stern, eds., The Responsibility of Power. |
| A. J. P. Taylor | War by Timetable (1969) | Structuralist | Systemic; no single power | Argued that mobilization plans outran political control and narrowed statesmen's options once the crisis began. Governments nonetheless made real choices within those constraints. |
| Paul W. Schroeder | "World War I as Galloping Gertie: A Reply to Joachim Remak" (1972) | Systemic | Britain | Replied to Remak by arguing that the pre-1914 system was prone to escalation beyond any government's control, drawing all five great powers into an unwanted war. Assigned principal responsibility to Britain, contrary to the Versailles verdict. |
| Paul Kennedy | The Rise of the Anglo-German Antagonism, 1860–1914 (1980) | Systemic / imperial | Anglo-German rivalry, no sole culprit | Traced the deterioration of British-German relations through naval, colonial and economic competition. Treated that antagonism as a structural cause of the alignment of 1914. |
| Andreas Hillgruber | Deutschlands Rolle in der Vorgeschichte der beiden Weltkriege (1967; Eng. Germany and the Two World Wars, 1981) | Fischer-era | Germany | Argued that Berlin took a calculated risk to break the Entente, accepting but not intending a wider war. Drew on Riezler's concept of Risikopolitik. |
| James Joll | The Origins of the First World War (1984) | Mentalities | Shared across European elites | Emphasized the unspoken assumptions of European decision-makers: fatalism, militarism, and shared misperceptions. Treated these as the context within which July's decisions were made. |
| Samuel R. Williamson Jr. | Austria-Hungary and the Origins of the First World War (1991) | Austro-Hungarian focus | Austria-Hungary, with German backing | Placed the initiative in Vienna's determination to crush Serbia. Showed how German support removed the restraints on that decision. |
| Niall Ferguson | The Pity of War (1998) | Revisionist | Britain's intervention | Argued that Germany fought a preventive war and that British entry turned a continental conflict into a world war. Held that Britain's decision was a blunder, not a necessity. |
| Annika Mombauer | Helmuth von Moltke and the Origins of the First World War (2001) | Post-Fischer | German military leadership, with Vienna | Argued that Moltke and the General Staff pressed for war in 1914 and that German responsibility was primary. Did not exculpate other powers. |
| David Fromkin | Europe's Last Summer (2004) | Intentionalist | Germany and Austria-Hungary | Argued that Berlin and Vienna sought a Balkan war and that Germany's military leadership accepted the wider conflict that followed. |
| William Mulligan | The Origins of the First World War (2010) | Post-Fischer synthesis | Diffuse; failure of crisis management | Located the cause in the breakdown of the international order and in decision-making under crisis. Paid attention to the whole of the system and to long-run structural change. |
| Sean McMeekin | The Russian Origins of the First World War (2011); July 1914: Countdown to War (2013) | Eastern turn | Russia, with France | Argued that Russian mobilization and Franco-Russian coordination drove the escalation. Treated the German response as largely reactive. |
| Christopher Clark | The Sleepwalkers (2012) | Contingency | Diffuse; all the major powers | Argued that the leaders of every great power made decisions with imperfect understanding of their consequences. Resisted the attribution of singular German guilt. |
| Alexander Anievas | "1914 in World Historical Perspective" (article, European Journal of International Relations); Cataclysm 1914 (ed., 2014) | Marxist / structural | Systemic; imperial competition | Linked the origins to uneven and combined development and to imperial rivalry. |
| Margaret MacMillan | The War That Ended Peace (2013) | Contingency | Diffuse; Germany reckless but not uniquely guilty | Presented the war as avoidable, the product of personalities, institutions and cultural shifts. Stressed the choices available to decision-makers at each stage. |
| Max Hastings | Catastrophe 1914 (2013) | Critical of revisionism | Germany and Austria-Hungary | Maintained that Germany's encouragement of Austria's move against Serbia was decisive in escalating the crisis. Challenged the downplaying of German responsibility. |
| Jörn Leonhard | Die Büchse der Pandora (2014; Eng. Pandora's Box, 2018) | Multicausal | Diffuse | Combined long-term developments (imperialism, alliances, the arms race) and ideological factors with short-term contingency. Allowed no single power sole responsibility. |
| John C. G. Röhl | Wilhelm II: Into the Abyss of War and Exile (2014) | Fischer school, personal rule | The Kaiser and his military circle | Argued that the German leadership, including Wilhelm II, set a course toward war by 1914, citing the war council of December 1912. |
| Dominic Lieven | Towards the Flame (2015) | Eastern turn | Russia as a central actor | Put Russian decision-making and the Russian state at the center of the July Crisis. Treated St Petersburg's choices as pivotal to its widening. |

== See also ==
- Causes of World War I
- Diplomatic history of World War I
  - American entry into World War I
  - Austro-Hungarian entry into World War I
  - British entry into World War I
  - French entry into World War I
  - German entry into World War I
  - Italian entry into World War I
  - Japanese entry into World War I
  - Ottoman entry into World War I
  - Russian entry into World War I
- History of the Balkans
- International relations (1814–1919)
- Paris Peace Conference, 1919
- War guilt question
- Causes of World War II

== Bibliography ==
- Bonnell, Andrew G. (2025). "Introduction: Origins and Outbreak, Why War?". In Paul R. Bartop (ed.). The Routledge History of the First World War. London and New York: Routledge. pp. 1–14. ISBN 978-1-032-42602-0.
- Bresciani, Marco. "From 'East to West', the 'world crisis' of 1905–1920: a re-reading of Elie Halévy." First World War Studies 9.3 (2018): 275–295.
- Cohen, Warren I. (1967). The American Revisionists: The Lessons of Intervention in World War I. University of Chicago Press. ISBN 978-0-226-11213-8.
- Cornelissen, Christoph, and Arndt Weinrich, eds. Writing the Great War: The Historiography of World War I from 1918 to the Present, (Berghahn Books, 2020)
- D'Agostino, Anthony (Spring 2004). "The Revisionist Tradition in European Diplomatic History". Journal of the Historical Society. 4 (2): 255–287. doi:10.1111/j.1529-921X.2004.00098.x.
- Evans, R. J. W. "The Greatest Catastrophe the World Has Seen" The New York Review of Books Feb 6, 2014 online
- Gillette, Aaron (November 2006). "Why Did They Fight the Great War? A Multi-Level Class Analysis of the Causes of the First World War". The History Teacher. 40 (1): 45–58. doi:10.2307/30036938. JSTOR 30036938.
- Hewitson, Mark (2014). Germany and the Causes of the First World War. Bloomsbury Publishing. ISBN 978-1-84520-729-8.
- Horne, John, ed. A Companion to World War I (2012) 38 topics essays by scholars; emphasis on historiography.
- Iriye, Akira (September 2014). "The Historiographic Impact of the Great War". Diplomatic History. 38 (4): 751–762. doi:10.1093/dh/dhu035.
- Jones, Heather (September 2013). "As the Centenary Approaches: The Regeneration of First World War Historiography". The Historical Journal. 56 (4): 857–878. doi:10.1017/S0018246X13000216.
- Keiger, J.F.V. (April 2013). "The Fischer Controversy, the War Origins Debate and France: A Non-History". Journal of Contemporary History. 48 (2): 363–375. doi:10.1177/0022009412472715. S2CID 159493977.
- Kramer, Alan (February 2014). "Recent Historiography of the First World War-Part I". Journal of Modern European History. 12 (1): 5–27. doi:10.17104/1611-8944_2014_1_5. S2CID 202927667.
- Kramer, Alan (May 2014). "Recent Historiography of the First World War (Part II)". Journal of Modern European History. 12 (2): 155–174. doi:10.17104/1611-8944_2014_2_155. S2CID 146860980.
- Lebow, Richard Ned. "Lessons of World War I." in Lebow, ed., Avoiding War, Making Peace (Palgrave Macmillan, Cham, 2018). pp 95–127.
- Levy, Jack S., and John A. Vasquez, eds. The Outbreak of the First World War: Structure, Politics, and Decision-Making (Cambridge UP, 2014).
- Lieber, Keir A. "The new history of World War I and what it means for international relations theory." International Security 32.2 (2007): 155–191. online
- Marczewski, Jerzy (1977). "German Historiography and the Problem of Germany's Responsibility for World War I". Polish Western Affairs. 12 (2): 289–309.
- Martel, Gordon. Origins of the First World War (Taylor & Francis, 2016).
- Mombauer, Annika (2002). The Origins of the First World War: Controversies and Consensus. London: Routledge. ISBN 978-0-582-41872-1.
- Mombauer, Annika. "Guilt or Responsibility? The Hundred-Year Debate on the Origins of World War I." Central European History 48#4 (2015): 541–564.
- Mombauer, Annika. "The German centenary of the First World War." War & Society 36.4 (2017): 276–288.
- Mombauer, Annika (2007). "The First World War: Inevitable, Avoidable, Improbable Or Desirable? Recent Interpretations On War Guilt and the War's Origins". German History. 25 (1): 78–95. doi:10.1177/0266355407071695.
- Mulligan, William: The Historiography of the Origins of the First World War, in: 1914-1918-online. International Encyclopedia of the First World War.
- Mulligan, William (2014). "The Trial Continues: New Directions in the Study of the Origins of the First World War". The English Historical Review. 129 (538): 639–666. doi:10.1093/ehr/ceu139.
- Nugent, Christine (April 2008). "The Fischer Controversy: Historiographical Revolution or Just Another Historians' Quarrel?". Journal of the North Carolina Association of Historians. 16: 77–114.
- Ritter, Gerhard (1997) [1962]. "Anti-Fischer: A New War-Guilt Thesis?". In Herwig, Holger (ed.). The Outbreak of World War One: Causes and Responsibilities. Houghton Mifflin. pp. 135–142. ISBN 978-0-6694-1692-3.
- Röhl, John C. G. "Goodbye to all that (again)? The Fischer thesis, the new revisionism and the meaning of the First World War." International Affairs 91.1 (2015): 153–166. online Archived 2017-08-09 at the Wayback Machine
- Schroeder, Paul W. Stealing Horses to Great Applause: The Origins of the First World War Reconsidered (2025), influential essays by a leading historian
  - Schroeder, Paul W. (2007). "Necessary conditions and World War I as an unavoidable war". In Levy, Jack; Goertz, Gary (eds.). Explaining War and Peace: Case Studies and Necessary Condition Counterfactuals. Routledge. pp. 147–236. ISBN 978-1-134-10140-5.
  - Schroeder, Paul W. (2004). "Embedded Counterfactuals and World War I as an Unavoidable War". Systems, Stability, and Statecraft: Essays on the International History of Modern Europe. Palgrave Macmillan US. ISBN 978-1-4039-6357-4.
- Schroeder, Paul W. (2007). "Necessary conditions and World War I as an unavoidable war". In Levy, Jack; Goertz, Gary (eds.). Explaining War and Peace: Case Studies and Necessary Condition Counterfactuals. Routledge. pp. 147–236. ISBN 978-1-134-10140-5.
- Seipp, Adam R. (October 2006). "Beyond the 'Seminal Catastrophe': Re-imagining the First World War". Journal of Contemporary History. 41 (4): 757–766. doi:10.1177/0022009406067756. JSTOR 30036418. S2CID 162385648.
- Showalter, Dennis (Winter 2006). "The Great War and Its Historiography". The Historian. 68 (4): 713–721. doi:10.1111/j.1540-6563.2006.00164.x. JSTOR 24453743. S2CID 144511421.
- Sked, Alan. "Austria-Hungary and the First World War." Histoire Politique 1 (2014): 16–49. online free
- Smith, Leonard V. (November 2007). "The Culture De Guerre and French Historiography of the Great War of 1914–1918". History Compass. 5 (6): 1967–1979. doi:10.1111/j.1478-0542.2007.00484.x.
- Strachan, Hew (March 2014). "The origins of the First World War". International Affairs. 90 (2): 429–439. doi:10.1111/1468-2346.12118.
- Trachtenberg, Marc. "The Meaning of Mobilization in 1914." International Security 15#3 (1991) pp. 120–150 online
- Vasquez, John A. "The First World War and International Relations Theory: A Review of Books on the 100th Anniversary." International Studies Review 16#4 (2014): 623–644.
- Waite, Robert G. (6 November 2014). "The dangerous and menacing war psychology of hatred and myth". American Historians and the Outbreak of the First World War 1914. An Overview (Speech). Berliner Gesellschaft für Faschismus- und Weltkriegsforschung.
- Williamson Jr, Samuel R., and Ernest R. May. "An identity of opinion: Historians and July 1914." Journal of Modern History 79.2 (2007): 335–387. online

=== Primary sources ===
- Barker. Ernest, et al. eds. Why we are at war; Great Britain's case (3rd ed. 1914), the official British case against Germany. online
