= Article 231 of the Treaty of Versailles =

Beginning of the 1919 treaty's reparations section

Article 231, often known as the war guilt clause (German: Kriegsschuldklausel), was the opening article of the reparations section of the Treaty of Versailles, which ended the First World War between the German Empire and the Allied and Associated Powers. The article did not use the word guilt but it served as a legal basis under which Germany was to pay reparations for damages caused during the war.

Article 231 was one of the most controversial points of the treaty. It specified:

The Allied and Associated Governments affirm and Germany accepts the responsibility of Germany and her allies for causing all the loss and damage to which the Allied and Associated Governments and their nationals have been subjected as a consequence of the war imposed upon them by the aggression of Germany and her allies.

Many German commentators viewed this clause as a national humiliation, forcing Germany to accept full responsibility for causing the war. German politicians were vocal in their opposition to the article in an attempt to generate international sympathy, while German historians worked to undermine the article with the objective of subverting the entire treaty. The Allied leaders were surprised at the German reaction; they saw the article only as a necessary legal basis to extract compensation from Germany. The article, with the signatory's name changed, was also included in the treaties signed by Germany's allies who did not view the clause with the same disdain as the Germans did. American diplomat John Foster Dulles—one of the two authors of the article—later regretted the wording used, believing it further aggravated the German people.

The historical consensus is that responsibility or guilt for the war was not attached to the article. Rather, the clause was a prerequisite to allow a legal basis to be laid out for the reparation payments that were to be made. Historians have also highlighted the unintended offence created by the clause, which caused anger and resentment amongst the German population.

== Background ==
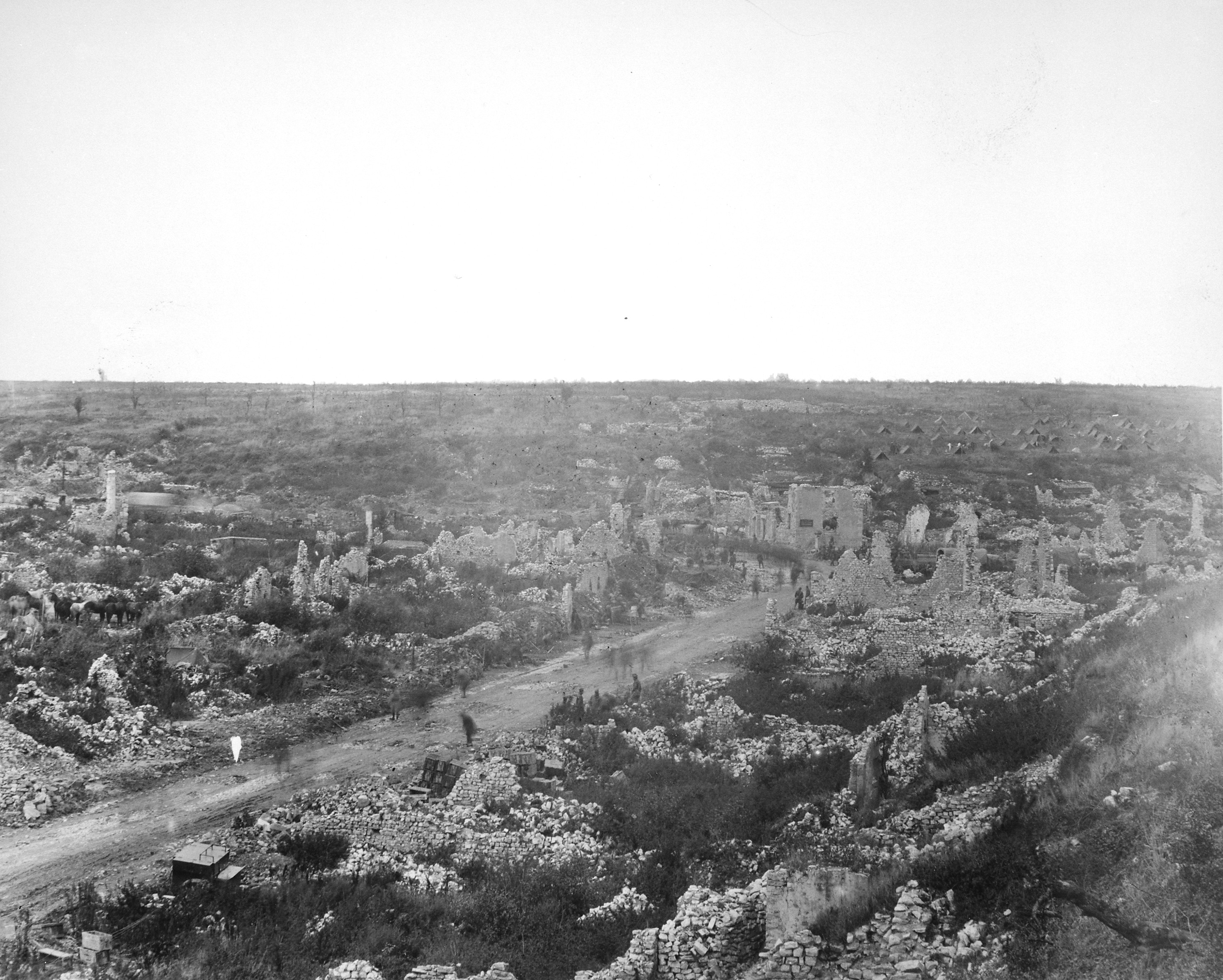
Avocourt, 1918, one of the many destroyed French villages, candidates for reconstruction funded by reparations

=== Course of the war ===
On 28 June 1914, Bosnian Serb youngster Gavrilo Princip assassinated the heir to the throne of Austria-Hungary, Archduke Franz Ferdinand, in Sarajevo. The assassination was part of a plot conceived by the Pan-Slavic nationalist organization Young Bosnia and supported by the Black Hand, a secret society founded by senior Serbian military and intelligence officials. The assassination caused a diplomatic crisis, resulting in Austria-Hungary declaring war on Serbia. Declaration of war was supported by the German government, who then declared war on and invaded France and neutral Belgium, ultimately leading to the outbreak of the First World War. For a variety of reasons, within weeks the major powers of Europe—divided into two alliances known as the Central Powers and the Triple Entente—went to war. As the conflict progressed, additional countries from around the globe became drawn into the conflict on both sides.

Fighting would rage across Europe, the Middle East, Africa and Asia for the next four years. On 8 January 1918, United States President Woodrow Wilson issued a statement that became known as the Fourteen Points. In part, this speech called for the Central Powers to withdraw from the territories they had occupied, for the creation of a Polish state, the redrawing of Europe's borders along ethnic ("national") lines, and the formation of a League of Nations. During the northern-hemisphere autumn of 1918, the Central Powers began to collapse. The German military suffered a decisive defeat on the Western Front, while on the Home Front the Imperial German Navy mutinied, prompting uprisings in Germany which became known as the German Revolution. The German government attempted to obtain a peace settlement based on the Fourteen Points, and maintained it was on this basis that Germany surrendered. Following negotiations, the Allied Powers and Germany signed an armistice, which came into effect on 11 November while German forces were still positioned in France and Belgium.

=== The armistice ===
The text of the 11 November armistice include a commitment from Germany to pay "reparation for damage done" to the Allied countries.

On 18 January 1919 the Paris Peace Conference began. The conference aimed to establish peace between the war's belligerents and to establish the post-war world. The Treaty of Versailles resulting from the conference had solely with Germany. This treaty, along with the others that were signed during the conference, each took their name from the suburb of Paris where the signings took place. While 70 delegates from 26 nations participated in the Paris negotiations, representatives from Germany were barred from attending, nominally over fears that a German delegation would attempt to play one country off against the other and unfairly influence the proceedings.

== Writing of the article ==
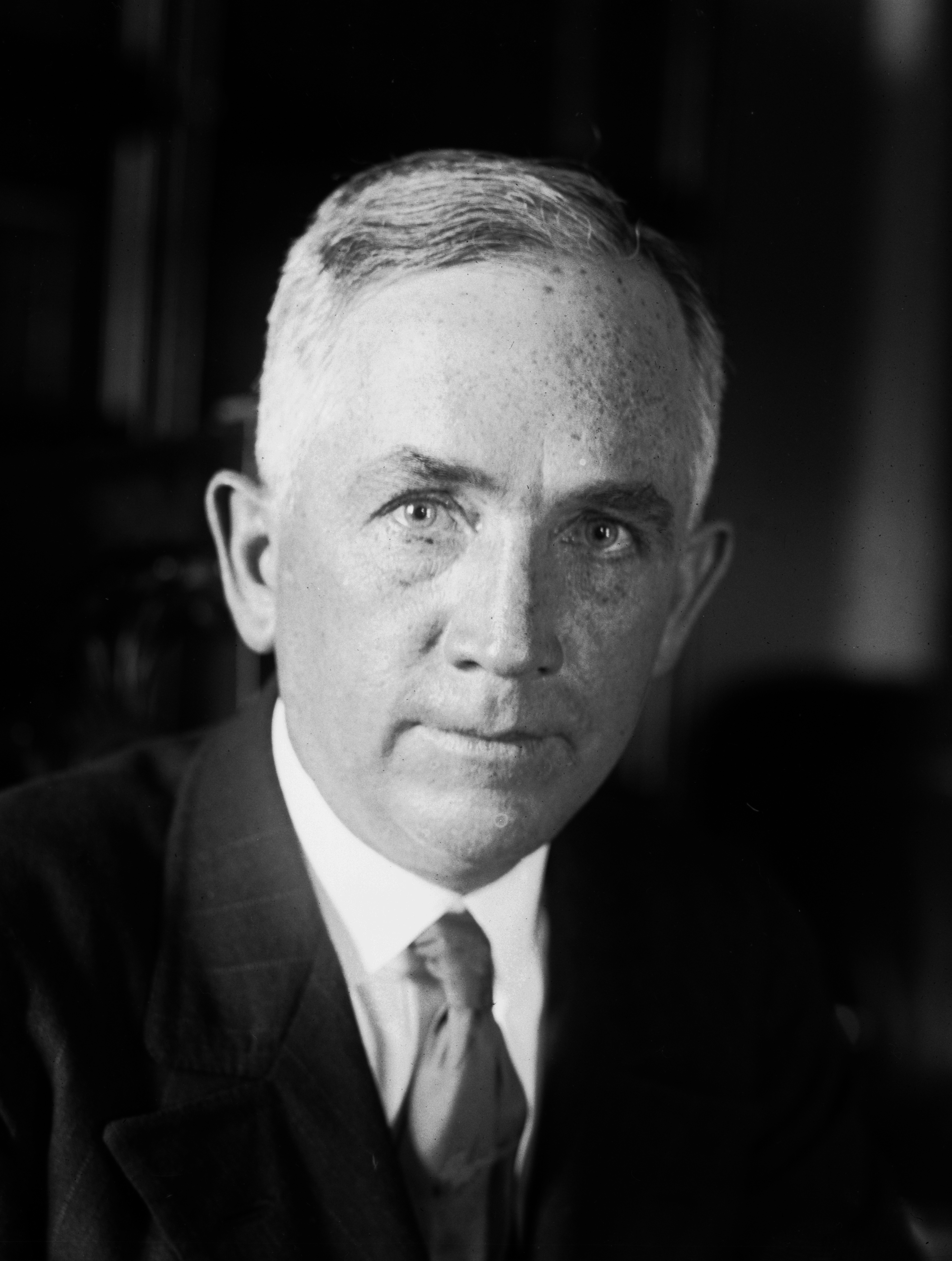
Norman Davis, one of the two authors of Article 231

The Americans, British and French all differed on the issue of reparations settlement. The Western Front had been fought in France, and that countryside had been heavily scarred in the fighting. France's most industrialized region in the north-east had been laid to waste during the German retreat. Hundreds of mines and factories were destroyed along with railroads, bridges and villages. Georges Clemenceau, the Prime Minister of France, thought it appropriate that any just peace required Germany to pay reparations for the damage they had caused. He also saw reparations as a means to ensure that Germany could not again threaten France and as well to weaken the German ability to compete with France's industrialization. Reparations would also go towards the reconstruction costs in other countries, such as Belgium, also directly affected by the war. British Prime Minister David Lloyd George opposed harsh reparations in favour of a less crippling reparations settlement so that the German economy could remain a viable economic power and British trading partner. He furthermore argued that reparations should include war pensions for disabled veterans and allowances to be paid to war widows, which would reserve a larger share of the reparations for the British Empire. Wilson opposed these positions, and was adamant that there be no indemnity imposed upon Germany.

During the peace conference the Commission on the Responsibility of the Authors of the War and on Enforcement of Penalties (Note: The commission was composed of 16 members from ten countries. All were trained legal professionals. They were: United States: United States Secretary of State Robert Lansing as well as international lawyer, and former solicitor to the United States Department of State, James Brown Scott.; British Empire: Attorney General Gordon Hewart, Solicitor General Ernest Pollock, and Prime Minister of New Zealand William Massey.; France: Politician André Tardieu, as well as the Dean of the Paris Law Faculty Ferdinand Larnaude.; Italy: Mr. Scialoja and Mr. Raimondo; Japan: Expert in international law Mineichirō Adachi, and diplomat Harukazu Nagaoka.; Belgium: International law scholar Edouard Rolin-Jaequemyns; Greece: Greek Foreign Minister and scholar of international law Nicolas Politis; Poland: Constantin Skirmunt; Romania: Jurist S. Rosental; Serbia: Chief international law expert to the Serbian peace delegation and Rector of the University of Belgrade Slobodan Jovanović) was established to examine the background of the war. The Commission reasoned that the "war was premeditated by the Central Powers ... and was the result of acts deliberately committed [by them] to make it unavoidable", concluding that Germany and Austria-Hungary had "deliberately worked to defeat all the many conciliatory proposals made by the Entente Powers and their repeated efforts to avoid war." This conclusion was duly incorporated into the Treaty of Versailles, led by Clemenceau and Lloyd George who were both insistent on the inclusion of an unequivocal statement of Germany's total liability. This left Wilson at odds with the other leaders of the conference. Instead, he proposed a repetition of a note sent by United States Secretary of State Robert Lansing to the German Government on 5 November 1918, stating that the "Allied Governments ... understand that compensation will be made by Germany for all damage done to the civilian population of the Allies and their property by the aggression of Germany ..."

"The Allied and Associated Governments affirm and Germany accepts the responsibility of Germany and her allies for causing all the loss and damage to which the Allied and Associated Governments and their nationals have been subjected as a consequence of the war imposed upon them by the aggression of Germany and her allies."

— Article 231

The actual wording of the article was chosen by American diplomats Norman Davis, and Secretary of State Robert Lansing's nephew, John Foster Dulles. Davis and Dulles produced a compromise between the Anglo-French and American positions, wording Article 231 and 232 to reflect that Germany "should, morally, pay for all war costs, but, because it could not possibly afford this, would be asked only to pay for civilian damages." Article 231, in which Germany accepted the responsibility of Germany and its allies for the damages resulting from the First World War, therefore served as a legal basis for the articles following it within the reparations chapter, obliging Germany to pay compensation limited to civilian damages. Similar clauses, with slight modification in wording, were present in the peace treaties signed by the other members of the Central Powers. (Note: Article 177 of the Treaty of Saint-Germain-en-Laye: "... Austria accepts the responsibility of Austria and her Allies for causing the loss and damage to which the Allied and Associated Governments and their nationals have been subjected as a consequence of the war imposed upon them by the aggression of Austria-Hungary and her Allies". Article 161 of the Treaty of Trianon: "The Allied and Associated Governments affirm and Hungary accepts the responsibility of Hungary and her allies for causing the loss and damage to which the Allied and Associated Governments and their nationals have been subjected as a consequence of the war imposed upon them by the aggression of Austria-Hungary and her allies." Article 121 of the Treaty of Neuilly-sur-Seine: "Bulgaria recognises that, by joining in the war of aggression which Germany and Austria-Hungary waged against the Allied and Associated Powers, she has caused to the latter losses and sacrifices of all kinds, for which she ought to make complete reparation". Article 231 of the Treaty of Sevres: "Turkey recognises that by joining in the war of aggression which Germany and Austria-Hungary waged against the Allied Powers she has caused to the latter losses and sacrifices of all kinds for which she ought to make complete reparation.")

== Reaction ==
=== German interpretation ===
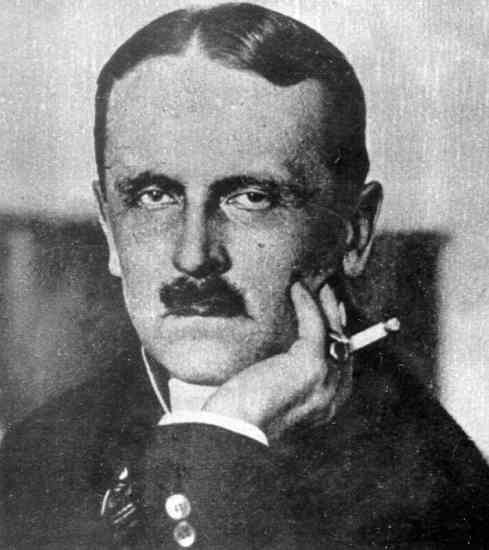
Count Ulrich von Brockdorff-Rantzau

Foreign Minister Count Ulrich von Brockdorff-Rantzau headed the 180-strong German peace delegation. They departed Berlin on 18 April 1919, anticipating that the peace talks would soon start and that they and the Allied Powers would negotiate a settlement. Earlier, in February of that year, Brockdorff-Rantzau had informed the Weimar National Assembly that Germany would have to pay reparations for the devastation caused by the war, but would not pay for actual war costs. The German government had also taken the position that it would be "inadvisable ... to elevate the question of war guilt". On 5 May, Brockdorff-Rantzau was informed that there would be no negotiations. Once the German delegation received the conditions of peace they would have fifteen days to reply. Following the drafting of the treaty, on 7 May the German and Allied delegations met and the Treaty of Versailles was handed off to be translated and for a response to be issued. At this meeting Brockdorff-Rantzau stated that "We know the intensity of the hatred which meets us, and we have heard the victors' passionate demand that as the vanquished we shall be made to pay, and as the guilty we shall be punished". However, he proceeded to deny that Germany was solely responsible for the war. Following the meeting, the German delegation retired to translate the 80,000 word document. As soon as the delegation realized the terms of peace, they agreed that they could not accept it without revision. They then proceeded to send their Allied counterparts, message after message attacking each part of the treaty. On 18 June, having disregarded the repeated explicit decisions of the government, Brockdorff-Rantzau declared that Article 231 would have Germany accept full responsibility for the war by force. Max Weber, an advisor with the German delegation, agreed with Brockdorff-Rantzau, also challenging the Allies over the issue of war guilt. He preferred to reject the treaty than submit to what he called a "rotten peace".

On 16 June, the Allied Powers demanded that Germany unconditionally sign the treaty within seven days or face the resumption of hostilities. The German government was divided on whether to sign or reject the peace treaty. On 20 June, Chancellor Philipp Scheidemann resigned rather than sign the treaty and was followed by Brockdorff-Rantzau and other members of the government. After being advised by Field Marshal Paul von Hindenburg that Germany was in no condition to resume the war, President Friedrich Ebert and the new Chancellor, Gustav Bauer, recommended that the Weimar National Assembly ratify the treaty. The Assembly did so by a large majority, and Clemenceau was informed nineteen minutes before the deadline expired. Germany unconditionally signed the peace treaty on 28 June.

Initially, Article 231 was not correctly translated. Rather than stating "... Germany accepts responsibility of Germany and her allies causing all the loss and damage ...", the German Government's edition read "Germany admits it, that Germany and her allies, as authors of the war, are responsible for all losses and damages ...". Germans felt that they the country had signed away her honor, and there was a prevailing belief of humiliation as the article was seen, overall, as an injustice. Historian Wolfgang Mommsen commented that despite the public outrage, German government officials were aware "that Germany's position on this matter was not nearly so favorable as the imperial government had led the German public to believe during the war." Additionally, although the article was in a different section entitled "Reparations", the placing of Article 231 in numerical order after Articles 227-230, which dealt with war crimes trials and were based on the report of the Allied Commission for Responsibility, linked Article 231 in the mind of the Germans to this report and by extension their responsibility for the war, rather than to damages caused by Germany during the war. Article 231 was instead based on the report of the Commission on Reparation of Damage.

=== Allied opinion on article ===
The Allied delegation initially thought Article 231 to be a mundane addition to the treaty intended to limit German liability with regard to reparations, and were surprised at the vehemence of the German protests. Georges Clemenceau rebuffed Brockdorff-Rantzau's allegations, arguing that "the legal interpretation [of the article] was the correct one" and not a matter of political question.

Lloyd George commented that "the English public, like the French public, thinks the Germans must above all acknowledge their obligation to compensate us for all the consequences of their aggression. When this is done we come to the question of Germany's capacity to pay; we all think she will be unable to pay more than this document requires of her.". Lloyd George further referred to the treaty as "firm, but just". When the treaty of Versailles was put to a vote in the House of Commons, only five votes were cast against it, and the second reading occupied only a day of time each in the Lords and the Commons indicating the ease with which the treaty passed through parliament.

Prior to the American entry into the war, Woodrow Wilson called for a "peace of reconciliation with Germany", what he dubbed a "peace without victory". His wartime speeches, however, rejected these earlier notions and he took an increasingly belligerent stance towards Germany. Following the war, on 4 September 1919, during his public campaign to rally American support for the Treaty of Versailles, Wilson commented that the treaty "seeks to punish one of the greatest wrongs ever done in history, the wrong which Germany sought to do to the world and to civilization, and there ought to be no weak purpose with regard to the application of the punishment. She attempted an intolerable thing, and she must be made to pay for the attempt." Regardless of the rhetoric, the American position was to create a balanced treaty that would appease everyone. Gordon Auchincloss, secretary to Edward M. House (one of Wilson's advisers), sent a copy of the clause to the State Department and stated "you will note that the President's principles have been protected in this clause".

Historian William Keylor commented that initially both United States diplomats believed that they had "devised a brilliant solution to the reparation dilemma"; appeasing both the British and French, as well as Allied public opinion irrespective of the fact that Allied leaders were aware of concerns surrounding German willingness to pay reparations and the disappointment that could follow. Vance C. McCormick (an economic adviser of Wilson) emphasized this point, and stated: "...the preamble is useful. We are adopting an unusual method in not fixing a definite sum. The preamble tends to explain this, and further, prepares the public mind for disappointment as to what actually can be secured." In 1940, Dulles stated that he was surprised that the article "could plausibly be, and in fact was, considered to be a historical judgement of war guilt". He further noted that the "profound significance of this article ... came about through accident, rather than design". Dulles took it personally that the Treaty of Versailles failed in its intentions of creating a lasting peace and believed that the treaty was one of the causes of the Second World War. By 1954, as United States Secretary of State and in discussion with the Soviet Union in regards to German reunification, he commented that "Efforts to bankrupt and humiliate a nation merely incite a people of vigor and of courage to break the bonds imposed upon them. ... Prohibitions thus incite the very acts that are prohibited."

== Impact ==
=== Reparations ===
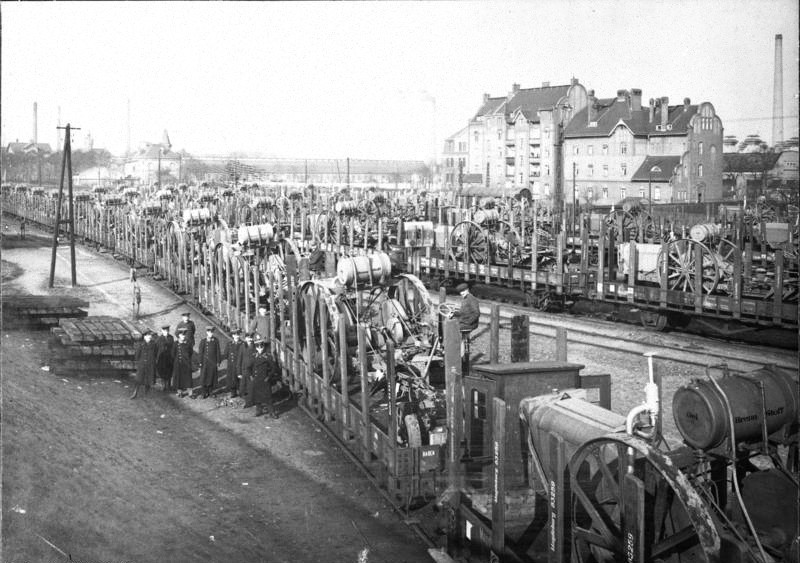
Trains, loaded with machinery, deliver their cargo as reparation payment in kind.

Compensation demanded from the defeated party was a common feature of peace treaties both before and after Versailles, and was explicitly permitted under the 1907 Hague Convention. The financial burden of the Treaty of Versailles was labelled "reparations", which distinguished them from punitive settlements usually known as indemnities (such as those used after the Franco-Prussian War). The reparations were intended for reconstruction and as compensation for families who had been bereaved by the war. Sally Marks wrote that the article "was designed to lay a legal basis for reparations" to be paid by Germany, and that Article 231 "established an unlimited theoretical liability" for which Germany would have to pay, but the following article "in fact narrowed German responsibility to civilian damages". (Note: "The Allied and Associated Governments recognise that the resources of Germany are not adequate ... to make complete reparation for all such loss and damage. The Allied and Associated Governments, however, require, and Germany undertakes, that she will make compensation for all damage done to the civilian population of the Allied and Associated Powers and to their property during the period of the belligerency ...") When the final reparation figure was established in 1921, it was based on an Allied assessment of [the] German capacity to pay, not on the basis of Allied claims.

The London Schedule of Payments, of 5 May 1921, established the full liability of the combined Central Powers at 132 billion gold marks. Of this figure, Germany was only required to pay 50 billion gold marks ($12.5 billion), a smaller amount than they had previously offered for terms of peace. Reparations were unpopular and strained the German economy, and between 1919 and 1931, when reparation payments ended, Germany had paid less than 21 billion gold marks. The Reparation Commission and the Bank for International Settlements gave a total German payment of 20.598 billion gold marks, whereas historian Niall Ferguson estimated that Germany paid no more than 19 billion gold marks. Ferguson also wrote that this sum was only 2.4 per cent of German national income between 1919 and 1932, while Stephen Schuker places the figure at an average of 2 per cent of national income between 1919 and 1931, in cash and kind, making a total transfer equal to 5.3 per cent of national income for the period. Gerhard Weinberg wrote that reparations were paid, towns were rebuilt, orchards replanted, mines reopened and pensions paid but the burden of repairs was shifted from the German economy to the damaged economies of the victors.

=== Effects on German political opinion and revisionism ===
Domestic German opposition to Article 231 has been held to have created a psychological and political burden on the post-war Weimar Republic. German politicians seeking international sympathy would use the article for its propaganda value, convincing many who had not read the treaties that the article implied full war guilt. German revisionist historians who subsequently attempted to ignore the validity of the clause found a ready audience among 'revisionist' writers in France, Britain, and the United States. The objective of both the politicians and historians was to prove that Germany was not solely guilty for causing the war; if that guilt could be disproved the legal requirement to pay reparations would disappear. To that end, the German government funded the Centre for the Study of the Causes of the War. The war guilt question (Kriegsschuldfrage) became a major theme of Adolf Hitler's political career.

United States Senator Henrik Shipstead argued that the failure to revise the article became a factor in Hitler's rise to power, a view held by some historians, such as Tony Rea and John Wright, who wrote that "the harshness of the War Guilt Clause and the reparations demands made it easier for Hitler to gain power in Germany." Despite these views, the historical consensus is that the article and the treaty, did not cause the rise of Nazism but that an unconnected rise in extremism and the Great Depression led to the NSDAP gaining greater electoral popularity and then being maneuvered into office. The Marxist historian Fritz Klein wrote that while there was a path from Versailles to Hitler, the former did not make "Hitler's takeover of power inevitable" and that "the Germans had a choice when they decided to take this path. In other words, they did not have to. Hitler's victory was not an unavoidable result of Versailles."

== Historical assessment ==
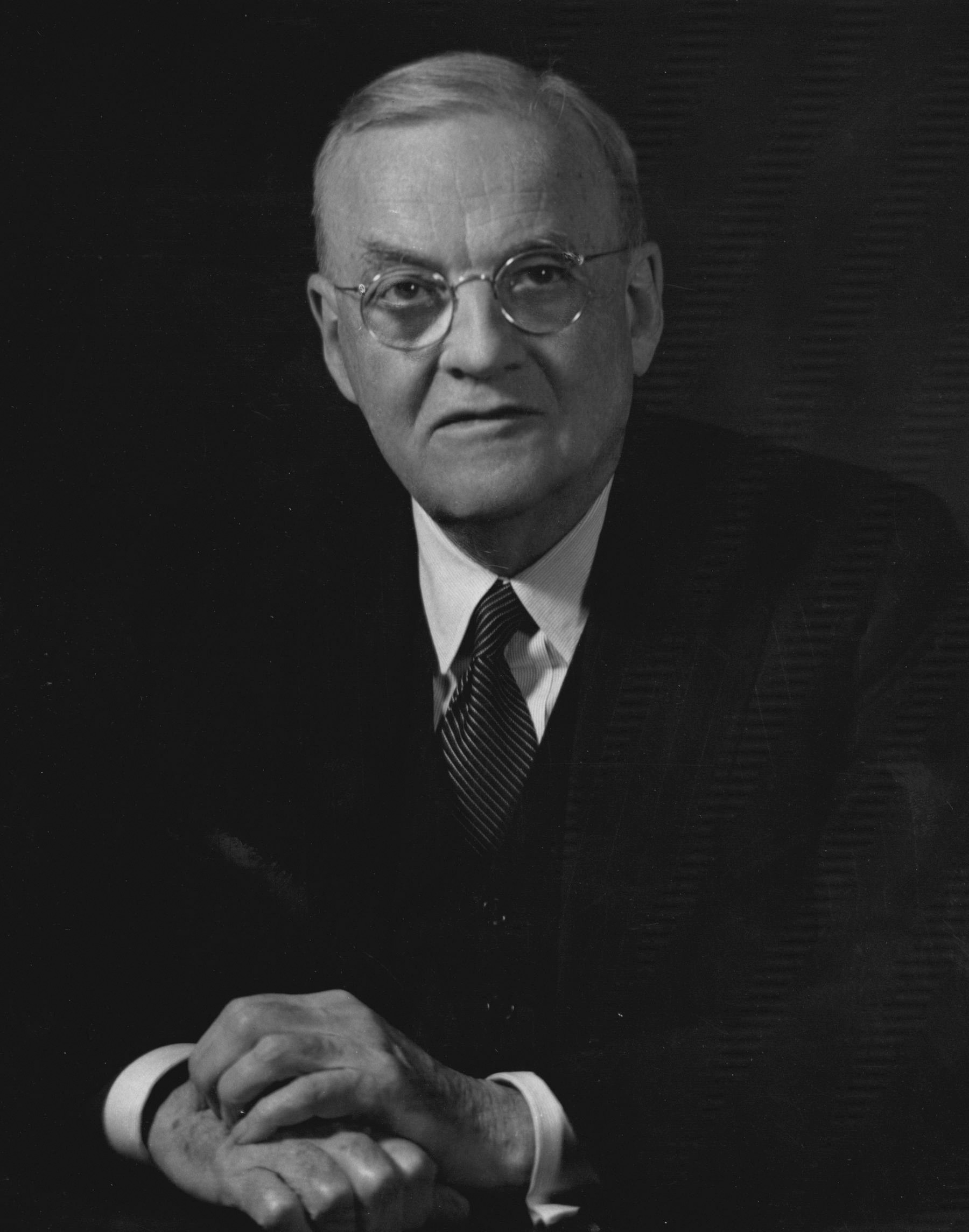
John Foster Dulles, the second author of the article

In 1926, Robert C. Binkley and A. C. Mahr of Stanford University, wrote that German accusations of the article assigning war guilt were "ill-founded" and "mistaken". The article was more "an assumption of liability to pay damages than an admission of war guilt" and compared it with "a man who undertakes to pay all the cost of a motor accident than to the plea of guilty entered by an accused criminal". They wrote that "it is absurd" to charge the reparation articles of the treaty with any "political meaning" and the legal interpretation "is the only one that can stand". They concluded that German opposition "is based upon a text which has no legal validity whatsoever, and which Germany never signed at all." Sidney Fay was the "most outspoken and influential critic" of the article. In 1928, he concluded that all of Europe shared the blame for the war and that Germany had no intention of launching a general European war in 1914.

In 1937, E. H. Carr commented that "in the passion of the moment" the Allied Powers had "failed to realize that this extorted admission of guilt could prove nothing, and must excite bitter resentment in German minds." He concluded "German men of learning set to work to demonstrate the guiltlessness of their country, fondly believing that, if this could be established, the whole fabric of the treaty would collapse." René Albrecht-Carrié wrote in May 1940, that "article 231 gave rise to an unfortunate controversy, unfortunate because it served to raise a false issue." He wrote that the German inter-war argument "rested on her responsibility for the out-break of the war" and if that guilt could be disproved then the legal requirement to pay reparations would disappear.

In 1942, Luigi Albertini published The Origins of the War of 1914 and concluded that Germany was primarily responsible for the outbreak of the war. Albertini's work, rather than spurring on new debate, was the culmination of the first research phase into the war guilt question. The issue came back between 1959 and 1969, when Fritz Fischer in Germany's Aims in the First World War and War of Illusions "destroyed the consensus about shared responsibility for the First World War" and "placed the blame ... firmly on the shoulders of the Wilhelmine elite." By the 1970s, his work "had emerged as the new orthodoxy on the origins of the First World War". In the 1980s, James Joll led a new wave of First World War research concluding "that the origins of the First World War were "complex and varied" although "by December 1912" Germany had decided to go to war.

In 1978, Marks re-examined the reparation clauses of the treaty and wrote that "the much-criticized 'war guilt clause', Article 231, which was designed to lay a legal basis for reparations, in fact makes no mention of war guilt" but only specified that Germany was to pay for the damages caused by the war they imposed upon the allies and "that Germany committed an act of aggression against Belgium is beyond dispute". "Technically, Britain entered" the war and French troops entered Belgium "to honor" the "legal obligation" to defend Belgium under the 1839 Treaty of London and that "Germany openly acknowledged her responsibility in regard to Belgium on August 4, 1914, and May 7, 1919." Marks also wrote that "the same clause, mutatis mutandis" was incorporated "in the treaties with Austria and Hungary, neither of whom interpreted it as declaration of war guilt." Wolfgang Mommsen wrote that "Austria and Hungary, understandably paid no attention to this aspect of the draft treaty".

In 1986, Marks wrote that the German foreign office, supported by military and civilian notables, "focused on Article 231 ... hoping that, if one could refute German responsibility for the war, not only reparations but the entire treaty would collapse". Manfred Boemeke, Gerald Feldman, and Elisabeth Glaser wrote that "pragmatic requirements characteristically influenced the shaping of the much misunderstood Article 231. That paragraph reflected the presumed legal necessity to define German responsibility for the war in order to specify and limit the Reich's obligations". P.M.H. Bell wrote that despite the article not using the term 'guilt', and while "it may be that its drafters did not intend to convey a moral judgement of Germany", the article has "almost universally" became known as the war guilt clause of the treaty. Margaret MacMillan wrote that the German public's interpretation of Article 231 (together with Article 232) as unequivocally ascribing the fault for the war to Germany and her allies, "came to be the object of particular loathing in Germany and the cause of uneasy consciences among the Allies." The Allies never expected such a hostile reaction, for "no one thought there would be any difficulty over the clauses themselves."

Stephen Neff wrote that "the term 'war guilt' is a slightly unfortunate one, since to lawyers, the term 'guilt' primarily connotes criminal liability" while "the responsibility of Germany envisaged in the Versailles Treaty ... was civil in nature, comparable to the indemnity obligation of classical just-war theory." Louise Slavicek wrote that while "the article was an honest reflection of the treaty-writers' beliefs, including such a clause in the peace settlement was undiplomatic, to say the least." Diane Kunz wrote that "rather than being seen as an American lawyer's clever attempt to limit actual German financial responsibility by buying off French politicians and their public with the sop of a piece of paper" Article 231 "became an easily exploitable open sore". Ian Kershaw wrote that the "national disgrace" felt over the territorial concession under the Versailles treaty and the "war guilt" article and "defeat, revolution, and the establishment of democracy", had "fostered a climate in which a counter-revolutionary set of ideas could gain wide currency" and "enhanced the creation of a mood in which" extreme nationalist ideas could gain a wider audience and take hold.

Elazar Barkan argues that by "forcing an admission of war guilt at Versailles, rather than healing, the victors instigated resentment that contributed to the rise of Fascism." Klaus Schwabe wrote that the article's influence went far beyond the discussion of war guilt. By "refusing to acknowledge Germany's 'war guilt' the new German government implicitly exonerated the old monarchial order" and more importantly failed "to dissociate itself from the old regime." In doing so "it undermined its claim that post-revolutionary Germany was a historic new democratic beginning deserving credit at the peace conference."

== See also ==
- Reichstag inquiry into guilt for World War I, which met until the July 1932 German federal election
