= Fritz Klein (disambiguation) =

Fritz Klein (1888–1945) was a German Nazi physician convicted and executed in 1945 following Nuremberg "Doctors Trial."

Fritz Klein may also refer to:

- Fritz Klein (sex researcher) (1932–2006), Austrian physician and bisexual activist who resided in the US
- Fritz Heinrich Klein (1892–1977), Austrian composer and pupil of Alban Berg
- Fritz Klein (actor) (born 1948), American actor known for portraying Abraham Lincoln
- Fritz Klein (historian) (1924–2011), German historian and left-wing Social Democrat
