= Bernadotte Everly Schmitt =

American historian (1886–1969)

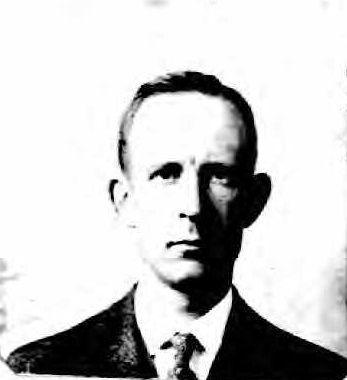
- 1920 passport application photo
- Born: May 19, 1886; Strasburg, Virginia, US
- Died: March 23, 1969 (aged 82); Alexandria, Virginia, US
- Education: University of Tennessee (B.A.); Merton College, Oxford (B.A. and M.A.); University of Wisconsin–Madison (PhD)
- Spouse: Damaris Kathryn Ames
- Awards: Pulitzer Prize for History; George Louis Beer Prize

Bernadotte Everly Schmitt (May 19, 1886 – March 23, 1969) was an American historian who was professor of Modern European History at the University of Chicago from 1924 to 1946. He is best known for his study of the causes of World War I, in which he emphasized Germany's perceived responsibility and rejected revisionist arguments.

== Biography ==
Schmitt received his Master of Arts from the University of Oxford and his PhD from the University of Wisconsin–Madison. In 1916 he gained notice with England and Germany, 1740–1914. His book The Coming of the War, 1914 (published in 1930) won him the 1930 George Louis Beer Prize of the American Historical Association and the 1931 Pulitzer Prize for History.

This work, for which he remains best known, took issue with the equally prominent study of the origins of the First World War published two years earlier by Sidney Fay (for which its author had also won a Beer Prize). In contrast to Fay's argument that Serbia and Russia were culpable, Schmitt insisted that Germany had indeed been largely responsible for the catastrophe. The debate between the "orthodox" school represented by Schmitt, Luigi Albertini and Pierre Renouvin, and the "revisionist" school of Fay, Harry Elmer Barnes and others that shifted blame from the Central Powers to the Allies, dominated scholarship on the "war-guilt" question until the publication of Fritz Fischer's Griff nach der Weltmacht (Germany's Aims in the First World War) (1961), which reopened the debate with a fresh approach by blaming Germany's prewar ambitions.

Schmitt was the first editor of the Journal of Modern History, serving from 1929 to 1946. In 1937 Schmitt published The Annexation of Bosnia, 1908–1909.

Schmitt was elected to the American Academy of Arts and Sciences in 1938 and the American Philosophical Society in 1942. In 1960, he was president of the American Historical Association. He died in 1969.

== Legacy ==
The American Historical Association offers the Bernadotte E. Schmitt Grants to support research in the history of Europe, Africa, and Asia.

== Bibliography ==
- Lieber, Keir A. "The new history of World War I and what it means for international relations theory." International Security 32.2 (2007): 155–191. online
