= Germany's Aims in the First World War =

1961 book by Fritz Fischer

- Author: Fritz Fischer
- Original title: Griff nach der Weltmacht: Die Kriegzielpolitik des kaiserlichen Deutschland 1914–1918
- Language: German
- Genre: History
- Publisher: W. W. Norton & Company
- Publication date: 1961
- Publication place: Germany
- English publication date: 1967
- ISBN: 0-393-09798-6

Germany's Aims in the First World War (German: Griff nach der Weltmacht: Die Kriegszielpolitik des kaiserlichen Deutschland 1914–1918, lit. 'Reaching for World-Power: Imperial Germany's War Aims 1914–1918') is a book by German historian Fritz Fischer. It is one of the leading contributions to historical analysis of the causes of World War I, and along with this work War of Illusions (Krieg der Illusionen) gave rise to the "Fischer Thesis" on the causes of the war. The title translates as "Grab for World Power". or "Bid for World Power". Essentially Fischer attempts to link together a continuum of German belligerence in its "grab for power" weaving it all together into a cohesive theme of German Weltpolitik.

== Publication ==
Griff nach der Weltmacht was published in October 1961. It was published in Britain under the title Germany's Aims in the First World War in 1967, translated by C.A. Macartney with an introduction by James Joll. The book included a memorandum by the then German Chancellor Bethmann-Hollweg dated 9 September 1914 which set out a plan for Germany to dominate Europe.

== Controversy ==
Fischer argued that Germany had a policy of deliberately provoking war during July 1914 and that during the war Germany developed a set of annexationist war aims similar to those of Adolf Hitler during the Second World War. On publication, the book caused controversy in West Germany as it challenged the view that Hitler was an aberration by emphasising the continuity in German foreign policy in 1914 and 1939. The book was also controversial for challenging the established view that Germany did not bear the primary responsibility for outbreak of the war, the so-called "war guilt lie". Fischer also claimed that German elites had wanted war since as early as 1912, with the victory of the SPD in the Reichstag.

== Academic reaction ==
The historian John Moses stated in his 1975 work The Politics of Illusion that "No serious German historian today can venture to pit himself against the evidence compiled by the Fischer school." Fischer inspired several disciples, including the historian Imanuel Geiss. However, Fischer was ridiculed by conservative German historians who created a backlash against his ideas. The most notable critic was conservative historian and patriot Gerhard Ritter, who is said to have broken down in tears when lecturing on Fischer's line of argument in Griff nach der Weltmacht. Fischer's ideas were welcomed by historians in communist East Germany; Fritz Klein considered Fischer's views to be uncontroversial.

Mombauer argues that Fischer's work led to greater discussion of the Holocaust by German history professors. A number of German and British historians find the assertions of Fischer a glaring oversimplification of how the First World War developed, arguing that is decidedly disingenuous given the complexity of the situation as a whole - especially since parts of the evidence for German war aims (i.e. belligerence) from before the Great War were collected amid the fringe writings of Pan-Germans or were parceled together from Kaiser Wilhelm's rantings; none of which constituted official state policy.

Stephen A. Schuker, writing in 2015, notes that although Fischer's book aroused great controversy when it was published, "Fischer's work made its way. Refinements by Immanuel Geiss, John Röhl, Holger Afflerbach, Annika Mombauer, and others have confirmed the essentials".

== See also ==
- Article 231 of the Treaty of Versailles
- Causes of World War I
- Historiography of the causes of World War I
- Septemberprogramm
- Weltpolitik
- War guilt question
- War of Illusions
- Vienna Conference (August 1, 1917)
- Vienna Conference (October 22, 1917)
- Vienna Conference (March 16, 1917)
