= Fritz Klein (actor) =

American actor (born 1948)

- Born: 1948 (age 76–77)
- Occupation(s): Film and stage actor

Richard Frederick "Fritz" Klein (born 1948) is an American actor.

One of the nation's best known reenactors of Abraham Lincoln, he has portrayed the 16th United States president in a variety of shorter films and at numerous venues across the U.S. since 1981. Klein's portrayals of the president have achieved local and national recognition. Most of Klein's recognition stems from his uncanny resemblance to the late 16th president of the United States. He resides with his family in Springfield, Illinois. Some of his most notable credits include Lincoln's Last Day, Lost River: Lincoln's Secret Weapon, Lincoln: American Mastermind, and Lincoln's Last Night. Klein has performed the role of Abraham Lincoln in 43 states as well as internationally. He now spends some of his summers playing Lincoln in the local "History Comes Alive" program in Springfield, Illinois.
