= Fritz Klein (historian) =

German Marxist historian

Fritz Klein, Jr. (11 July 1924, Berlin – 26 May 2011, Berlin) was a German Marxist historian specializing in the German Empire and debates on the Empire's role before, during, and after World War II. He was an official East German historian prior to German reunification in 1990. From 1979 to 1989, he served the Stasi as an informer under the codename "Wilhelm".

== Life and career ==
His father was journalist Fritz Klein, Sr., editor of the Deutsche Allgemeine Zeitung from 1924 to 1933, when he was fired by the Nazi government. The younger Klein served as a soldier in World War II. After 1945, he opted for communism, joining the Communist Party in the GDR. In 1947 he married Dorle Deiters, with whom he had a son, Wolfgang. He enrolled at Humboldt University in Berlin in 1946, and received his doctorate in 1952 with the thesis Die diplomatischen Beziehungen Deutschlands zur Sowjetunion 1917 - 1932. (The Diplomatic Relationship of Germany to the Soviet Union 1917 - 1932.).

After his graduation, he was appointed as editorial secretary and later as editor of the "Zeitschrift für Geschichtswissenschaft" ("Journal of Historical Studies"), but was removed in 1957 for political reasons, but was asked to take the post again in 1990. He worked for more than 30 years as a professor and researcher at the Institut für Geschichte of the Deutsche Akademie der Wissenschaften (Institute of General History at the German Academy of Sciences at Berlin). During his tenure there, he supervised the publication of the three volume Deutschland im Ersten Weltkrieg, which Roger Chickering called "the richest and most comprehensive account of Germany in the First World War".

Klein was an active part in the Fischer Controversy, around Fritz Fischer's Germany's Aims in the First World War, which argued that Germany was responsible for instigating World War I.

== Selected publications ==
- Die diplomatischen Beziehungen Deutschlands zur Sowjetunion 1917 – 1932. (The Diplomatic Relationship of Germany to the Soviet Union 1917 - 1932.) Rütten & Loening, Berlin 1952
- Es begann in Sarajewo. Akademie Verlag, Berlin 1964.
- Der deutsche Imperialismus und die Entstehung des ersten Weltkrieges. Leipzig 1968.
- Germany in World War I in 3 volumes by a team of authors led by Fritz Klein. Leipziger Universitätsverlag, Leipzig 1968–1970. Reissue: Leipziger Universitätsverlag, Leipzig 2004, ISBN 3-937209-84-0
  - Deutschland im Ersten Weltkrieg, Bd. 1. (Germany in World War, Vol. 1: Preparation, initiation and progression of the war until end of 1914.)
  - Deutschland im Ersten Weltkrieg, Bd. 2. (Germany in World War, Vol. 2: January 1915 to October 1917.)
  - Deutschland im Ersten Weltkrieg, Bd. 3. (Germany in World War, Vol. 3: November 1917 to November 1918.)
- Drinnen und Draußen: Ein Historiker in der DDR. (Inside and outside. A historian of the GDR.) S. Fischer Verlag, Frankfurt am Main 2000 ISBN 978-3-596-15179-0
