= Diane Kunz =

American historian

Diane Bernstein Kunz (born November 9, 1952) is an American author, historian, and lawyer from Durham, North Carolina, and executive director of a not-for-profit adoption advocacy group, the Center for Adoption Policy. She is the author of Butter and Guns (1997), an overview of America's Cold War economic diplomacy.

== Biography ==
Diane Bernstein Kunz was born November 9, 1952, in Queens, New York.

She gained a bachelor's degree from Barnard College and a J.D. degree from Cornell University.

She was a corporate lawyer from 1976 to 1983, then took an M.Litt in diplomatic and economic history at Oxford University. She received her PhD from Yale University in 1989; Gaddis Smith directed her dissertation. She taught diplomatic history at Yale. In a 1997 essay, she argued that "John F. Kennedy was a mediocre president. Had he obtained a second term, federal civil rights policy during the 1960s would have been substantially less productive and US actions in Vietnam no different from what actually occurred. His tragic assassination was not a tragedy for the course of American history." In 1996 and 1998 she was twice declined tenure at Yale, to the surprise of her students and colleagues. She taught at Columbia University from 1998 to 2001, and was a research scholar at New York Law School from 2004 to 2005, where she has organised annual conferences on adoption policy. She founded the Center for Adoption Policy with Ann N. Reese in 2001, and practices adoption law with Rumbold & Seidelman. Kunz taught at the Duke University School of Law as a senior lecturing fellow between 2017 and 2022.

She has four sons and four daughters adopted from China.

== Publications ==
- Chapter Camelot Continued in Virtual History ed Nial Ferguson, (1999) Basic Books, noted in ref 5 above.
- Butter and Guns (1997), an overview of America's Cold War economic diplomacy. ISBN 0-684-82795-6
- The Diplomacy of the Crucial Decade (1994), discussion of diplomacy in 1960's America. ISBN 0-231-08176-6 (cloth), ISBN 0-231-08177-4
- The Economic Diplomacy of the Suez Crisis (1991) Chapel Hill : University of North Carolina Press, c1991. xii, 295 p. : ports.; 24 cm. ISBN 0-8078-1967-0 (alk. paper)
- The Battle for Britain's Gold Standard in 1931 (1987) London and New York: Croom Helm. viii, 207 p.; 23 cm. ISBN 0-7099-3120-4
