= War of Illusions =

Book by Fritz Fischer

- Title page in original German language, Krieg der Illusionen
- Author: Fritz Fischer
- Original title: Krieg der Illusionen
- Subject: World War I
- Publication date: 1969
- OCLC: 1634439
- Dewey Decimal: 327.43
- LC Class: DD228.5

War of Illusions: German policies from 1911 to 1914 is a book by German historian Fritz Fischer, first published in German in 1969 as Krieg der Illusionen.

Along with Fischer's Germany's Aims in the First World War, the book argues for German responsibility for the outbreak of the First World War.
