= Annika Mombauer =

British historian

Annika Mombauer was born in 1967 and grew up in the Ruhr district of Germany. She later moved to Great Britain, where she resides as of 2014. Mombauer is a historian best known for her work on General Helmuth von Moltke the Younger. She is a Senior Lecturer in Modern European History in the History Department at the Open University in Great Britain, and Associate Dean (Research) for the Arts Faculty.

== Career ==
Mombauer studied history at the Westfälische-Wilhelms-Universität (University of Münster) in Münster, Germany, and at the University of Sussex, where she was awarded a D.Phil. in history in 1998. She joined the Open University staff in 1998 as lecturer in modern European history. In 2003, she also became a visiting fellow at the Australian Defence Force Academy in Canberra, Australia.

From 2006 until 2011 she was the secretary of the German History Society. As of 2014, she was a member of the editorial board of 1914-1918 Online: International Encyclopedia of the First World War. She chaired the Open University department's Research Steering Group and the departmental REF panel until December 2013.

== Media ==
Mombauer was a contributor to Michael Portillo's documentary about the causes of World War I, The Great War of Words, broadcast by BBC Radio 4 in February 2014.

Mombauer was a contributor to Max Hastings' documentary about the causes of World War I, The Necessary War, broadcast by BBC 2 in February 2014.

== Selected works ==
- Helmuth von Moltke and the Origins of the First World War. Cambridge University Press, 2001.
- The Origins of the First World War: Controversies and Consensus. Longman, 2002.
- Die Julikrise. Europas Weg in den Ersten Weltkrieg (The July Crisis, Europe's Way to the First World War), published by C.H. Beck Verlag, Munich, 2014, 128 pp., ISBN 978-3-406-66108-2
- The Battle of the Marne, 1914. A comparative history, Cambridge University Press, 2014.
