= Septemberprogramm =

Plan of German territorial expansion

The Septemberprogramm (German: [zɛpˈtɛmbɐpʁoˌɡʁam], literally "September Program") was a memorandum authorized by Chancellor Theobald von Bethmann Hollweg of the German Empire at the beginning of World War I. It was drafted on 9 September 1914 by the Chancellor's private secretary, Kurt Riezler, in preparation of peace negotiations at a time when Germany was expected to defeat France quickly and decisively on the Western Front. The territorial changes proposed in the Septemberprogramm included making a vassal state of Belgium, annexing Luxembourg and portions of France, expanding German colonies in Africa, and increasing German influence in Eastern Europe at the expense of the Russian Empire.

The Septemberprogramm gained great notoriety after it was discovered by historian Fritz Fischer, who wrote that it was based on the Lebensraum philosophy as well as the Drang nach Osten nationalist movement of the 19th century, which made territorial expansion Imperial Germany's primary motive for war. This interpretation has been controversial. The modern consensus among historians is that it was more of a discussion document, drafted well after the start of the war, and not a formally adopted government policy.

== War goals ==
The Septemberprogramm was a list of possible goals for Germany to achieve in the war:

- France should cede some northern territory, such as the iron-ore mines at Briey to Germany and possibly a coastal strip running from Dunkirk to Boulogne-sur-Mer, to Belgium or Germany.
- France should pay a war indemnity high enough to prevent French rearmament for the next couple of decades. Additionally, a commercial treaty would make the French economy dependent on Germany and ban trade between France and the British Empire.
- France would partially disarm by demolishing its northern forts.
- Belgium should become a vassal state and cede the Ardennes and possibly Antwerp to Germany and give Germany military and naval bases.
- Luxembourg should become a member state of the German Empire.
- Buffer states would be created in territory carved out of the western Russian Empire, such as Poland, Ukraine, Belarus, Lithuania, Finland and a Baltic state.
- Germany would create a Mitteleuropa economic association, ostensibly egalitarian but actually dominated by Germany. Members would be France, Belgium, the Netherlands, Denmark, Austria-Hungary, Poland, and possibly Italy, Sweden, and Norway.
- The German colonial empire would be expanded. The German possessions in Africa would be enlarged to create a contiguous German colony across central Africa known as Mittelafrika, at the expense of the French and Belgian colonies. Presumably to leave open future negotiations with Britain, no British colonies were to be taken, but as a consequence Britain's hegemony in world affairs was to end.
- The Netherlands should be brought into a closer relationship to Germany while avoiding any appearance of coercion.

== Significance ==
The Septemberprogramm was based on suggestions from Germany's industrial, military, and political leadership. However, since Germany did not win the war, it was never put into effect. As historian Raffael Scheck concluded, "The government, finally, never committed itself to anything. It had ordered the Septemberprogramm as an informal hearing in order to learn about the opinion of the economic and military elites."

In the east, on the other hand, Germany and her allies did demand and achieve significant territorial and economic concessions from Russia in the Treaty of Brest-Litovsk and from Romania in the Treaty of Bucharest. Both treaties were annulled with the Armistice of 11 November 1918 that ended the fighting in World War I.
