= Fritz Fischer (historian) =

German historian (1908–1999)

- Born: 5 March 1908; Ludwigsstadt, Bavaria, German Empire
- Died: 1 December 1999 (aged 91); Hamburg, Germany
- Occupation: Historian
- Known for: The Fischer thesis

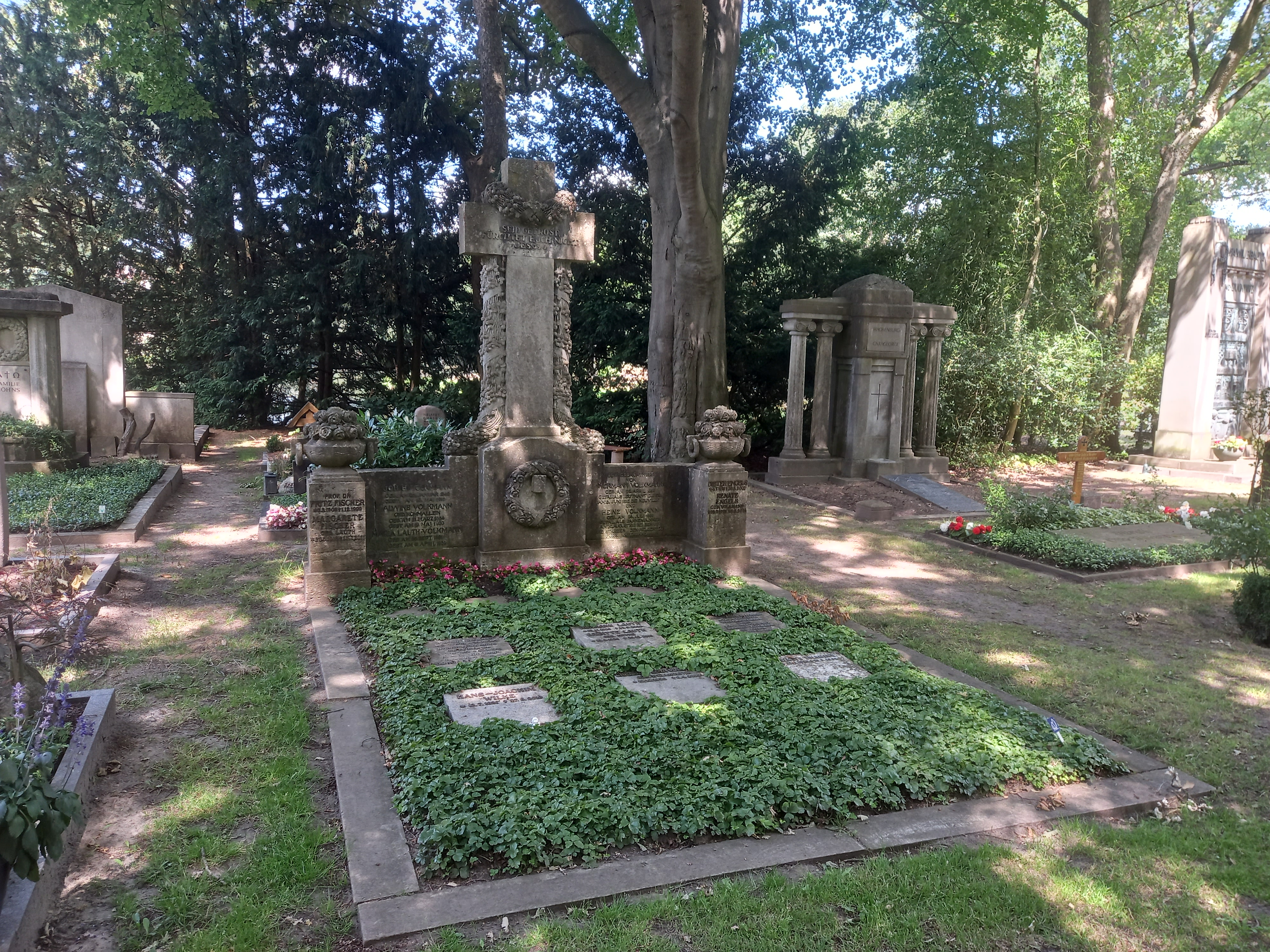
The tomb of Fritz Fischer

Fritz Fischer (5 March 1908 – 1 December 1999) was a German historian best known for his analysis of the causes of World War I. In the early 1960s Fischer advanced the thesis that responsibility for the outbreak of the war rested solely on Imperial Germany. Fischer's claims sparked a major historiographical debate in postwar West Germany, known as the Fischer Controversy.

Fischer was named in The Encyclopedia of Historians and Historical Writing as the most important German historian of the 20th century. In 1984, he was elected an honorary member of the American Historical Association.

== Biography ==
Fischer was born in Ludwigsstadt in Bavaria. His father was a railway inspector. Educated at grammar schools in Ansbach and Eichstätt, Fischer attended the University of Berlin and the University of Erlangen, where he studied history, pedagogy, philosophy and theology. Fischer joined the Nazi Party in 1939, and left the Party in 1942. Fischer's early works were heavily influenced by the standard Hegelian−Rankean tradition typical of the pre-1945 German historical profession, and as such, Fischer's early writings bore a strong bent towards the right. This influence was reflected in Fischer's first books, biographies of Ludwig Nicolovius, a leading 19th-century Prussian educational reformer and of Moritz August von Bethmann-Hollweg, the Prussian Minister of Education between 1858 and 1862.

In 1942, Fischer was given a professorship at the University of Hamburg and he married Margarete Lauth-Volkmann, with whom he fathered two children. He served in the Wehrmacht in World War II. After his release from a POW camp in 1947, he went on as a professor at Hamburg, where he stayed until his retirement in 1978. He was made an honorary member of the American Historical Association in 1984.

== Theorist and author ==
=== National Socialism ===
After World War II, Fischer re-evaluated his previous beliefs, and decided that the popular explanations of National Socialism offered by such historians as Friedrich Meinecke in which Adolf Hitler was just a Betriebsunfall (an 'occupational accident', meaning 'a spanner in the works') of history were unacceptable. In 1949, at the first post-war German Historians' Congress in Munich, Fischer strongly criticized the Lutheran tradition in German life, accusing the Lutheran church of glorifying the state at the expense of individual liberties and thus helping to bring about Nazi Germany. Fischer complained that the Lutheran church had for too long glorified the state as a divinely sanctioned institution that could do no wrong, and thus paved the way for National Socialism. Fischer rejected the then popular argument in Germany that Nazi Germany had been the result of the Treaty of Versailles, and instead argued that the origins of Nazi Germany predated 1914, and were the result of long-standing ambitions of the German power elite.

=== Fischer thesis ===
In the 1950s, Fischer examined the extant Imperial German government archives relating to the First World War. (This had previously been done by Karl Kautsky, Professor Walther Schucking and Count Max Montgelas, whose findings were published at Charlottenburg in November 1919 in a collection known as the "Kautsky documents". This large book was published in English in 1924 as Outbreak of the World War. A further book by Count Montgelas, The Case for the Central Powers, was published in London the following year.)

In 1961, Fischer, who by then had risen to the rank of full professor at the University of Hamburg, rocked the history profession with his first postwar book, Griff nach der Weltmacht: Die Kriegszielpolitik des kaiserlichen Deutschland 1914–1918 (published in English as Germany's Aims in the First World War), in which he argued that Germany had deliberately instigated a world war to become a world power. In this book, which was primarily concerned with the role played in the formation of German foreign policy by domestic pressure groups, Fischer argued that various pressure groups in German society had ambitions for aggressive imperialist policy in Eastern Europe, Africa and the Middle East. In Fischer's opinion, the Septemberprogramm (September Program) of September 1914 calling for the annexation of parts of Europe and Africa was an attempt at compromise between the demands of the lobbying groups in German society for wide-ranging territorial expansion. Fischer argued that the German government used the July Crisis caused by the assassination of Archduke Franz Ferdinand in the summer of 1914 to act on plans for a war against the Franco-Russian Alliance (Dual Entente) to create Mitteleuropa, a German-dominated Europe, and Mittelafrika, a German-dominated Africa. Though Fischer argued that the German government did not want a war with the British Empire, they were ready to run the risk in pursuit of annexation and hegemony.

The American historian Klaus Epstein opined, in his review of Fischer's book published in October 1962, that Fischer instantly rendered obsolete every book published on the subject of responsibility for the First World War and German war aims. Fischer's position on German responsibility for the world war has become known as the "Fischer thesis".

The book was preceded by Fischer's groundbreaking 1959 article in the Historische Zeitschrift in which he first published the arguments that he expanded upon in his 1961 book. In The Shield of Achilles: War, Peace, and the Course of History, Philip Bobbitt wrote that Fischer's publication made it "impossible to maintain" that the First World War had been a "ghastly mistake" rather than the consequence of German policy.

For most Germans, it was acceptable to believe that Germany had caused the Second World War, but not the Great War, which was still widely regarded as a war forced upon Germany by its encircling enemies. Fischer was the first German historian to publish documents showing that the German chancellor Dr. Theobald von Bethmann Hollweg had made plans in September 1914 (after the war began) to annex all of Belgium, part of France and part of Russia. Fischer suggested that there was continuity in German foreign policy from 1900 to the Second World War, implying that Germany was responsible for both world wars. These ideas were expanded in his later books Krieg der Illusionen (War of Illusions), Bündnis der Eliten (From Kaiserreich to Third Reich) and Hitler war kein Betriebsunfall (Hitler Was No Accident). Though Fischer was an expert on the Imperial era, his work was important in the debate on the foreign policy of the Third Reich.

In his 1969 book War of Illusions (Krieg der Illusionen), Fischer offered a detailed study of German politics from 1911 to 1914 in which he offered an analysis of German foreign policy based on the Primat der Innenpolitik (primacy of domestic politics). In Fischer's view, the Imperial German state saw itself besieged by rising demands for democracy at home and sought to weaken them through a policy of aggression abroad.

Fischer was the first German historian to support the negative version of the Sonderweg ("special path") interpretation of German history, which holds that the way German society developed from the Reformation (or from a later time, such as the establishment of the German Reich in 1871) inexorably culminated in the Third Reich. In Fischer's view, while 19th-century German society moved forward economically and industrially, it did not do so politically. For Fischer, German foreign policy before 1914 was largely motivated by the efforts of the reactionary German elite to distract the public from casting their votes for the Social Democrats and to make Germany the world's greatest power at the expense of France, Britain and Russia. The German elite that caused World War I was also responsible for the failure of the Weimar Republic, which opened the way for the Third Reich. This traditional German elite, in Fischer's analysis, was dominated by a racist, imperialist and capitalist ideology that was little different from the beliefs of the Nazis. Fischer called Bethmann Hollweg the "Hitler of 1914". Fischer's arguments set off what is called the "Fischer Controversy" of the early 1960s when German historians led by Gerhard Ritter attempted to rebut Fischer. The Australian historian John Moses noted in 1999 that the documentary evidence introduced by Fischer is extremely persuasive in arguing that Germany was responsible for World War I. In 1990, The Economist advised its readers to examine Fischer's "well documented" book to examine why people in Eastern Europe feared the prospect of German reunification.

Fischer and his analytical model caused a revolution in German historiography. His Primat der Innenpolitik heuristic, with its examination of the "inputs" into German foreign policy by domestic pressure groups and their interaction with the imperialist ideas of the German elite, forced a re-evaluation of German foreign policy in the Imperial era. Fischer's discovery of Imperial German government documents advocating the ethnic cleansing of Russian Poland and subsequent German colonization to provide Germany with Lebensraum (living space) led many to argue that similar schemes pursued by the Nazis in World War II were not due solely to Adolf Hitler's ideas but rather reflected widely held German aspirations that had existed long before Hitler. Many German historians in the 1960s such as Gerhard Ritter, who liked to argue that Hitler was just a Betriebsunfall of history with no real connection to German history, were outraged by Fischer's publication of these documents and attacked his work as "anti-German".

== Criticisms ==
Fischer's allegations caused a deep controversy throughout the academic world, particularly in West Germany. His arguments caused so much anger that his publisher's office in Hamburg was firebombed. His works inspired other historians, such as Gerhard Ritter, to write books and articles against his war-aims thesis.

Many critics claim that Fischer placed Germany outside the proper historical context. They argue that Germany was not uniquely aggressive among European nations of the early 20th century, a time when Social Darwinist views of struggle were popular in Europe's ruling classes. Critics also contend that in the centuries following Columbus's voyages to America, the Western European countries including Britain, France, Spain, Portugal, the Netherlands, etc. had already acquired vast overseas colonial possessions and spheres of influence long before German unification in 1871, so it is difficult to single out Germany alone as "grasping for world power" when this was a centuries-old Western European tradition. It was not until after World War II that many European colonial subjects finally won their independence. Even after the conclusion of the Second World War, France refused to relinquish control over Indochina.

Moreover, Fischer's timetable has also been criticized as inaccurate. Bethmann Hollweg's Septemberprogramm, outlining German war aims, was not produced until after the war had begun and was still going well for Germany. At the same time, other powers had been harboring similarly grandiose plans for post-war territorial gains. Since its defeat in the Franco-Prussian War in 1870, France was committed to a path of revenge against Germany and the reacquisition of Alsace and Lorraine. Russia, too, had long-standing, explicit war aims.

Gerd Krumeich said in 2013:

“Let me put it this way: the Fischer controversy now feels, in many respects, like ancient history. That is certainly how I feel when I return today to Fritz Fischer’s Germany’s Aims in the First World War or John C. G. Röhl’s Wilhelm II. Röhl’s biography runs to some 1,200 pages, yet it still strikes me as deeply rooted in the Fischer tradition, despite having been published only a few years ago. At times, I look back at these works with a sense of disbelief and wonder how we could once have been so enthusiastic about them. I have written about this in my own book, July 1914, as well. In many respects, Fritz Fischer’s work, Immanuel Geiss’s publications, and the writings of Fischer’s students now appear more dated than much of the historical scholarship produced in the 1930s. Their approach feels too rigid for serious historiography: the argument is built around a single overarching thesis that must be demonstrated at all costs. At that point, the historian is no longer guided by the facts; rather, he wants to force everything into his thesis. And that is precisely what has characterized Fritz Fischer throughout: it is an indictment of Germany, an indictment of the Federal Republic of Germany. That was the great enthusiasm of the 1968 generation, to which he gave considerable impetus. And in that respect, he achieved much that was valuable by encouraging critical reflection. But among historians, Fischer is no longer taken seriously today.”

== Bibliography ==
- Moritz August von Bethmann-Hollweg und der Protestantismus, 1938.
- Ludwig Nikolvius: Rokoko, Reform, Restoration, 1942.
- Griff nach der Weltmacht: die Kriegszielpolitik des Kaiserlichen Deutschland, 1914–18, 1961.
  - Germany's Aims in the First World War, translated by Hajo Holborn and James Joll (1968)
- Weltmacht oder Niedergang: Deutschland im Ersten Weltkrieg, 1965
  - World Power or Decline: The Controversy over Germany's Aims in the First World War, 1974
- Krieg der Illusionen: Die deutsche Politik von 1911 bis 1914, 1969.
  - War of Illusions: German Policies from 1911 to 1914, translated by Marian Jackson and Alan Bullock (1975)
- Bündnis der Eliten: Zur Kontinuität der Machtstrukturen in Deutschland, 1871–1945, 1979.
  - From Kaiserreich to the Third Reich: Elements of Continuity in German History, 1871–1945, translated by Roger Fletcher (1986)
- Hitler war kein Betriebsunfall: Aufsätze, 1992.

== See also ==
- Causes of World War I
- Historiography of the Causes of World War I
- Karl Max, Fürst Lichnowsky
