= Hermann Lutz =

German civil servant and writer

Hermann Lutz (1881–1965) was a German civil servant and writer.

From 1919 to 1937, Lutz worked for the Kriegsschuldreferat (War Guilt Section) within the German Foreign Ministry. He contributed the section on 'The German Case' to the 'War Guilt' article in the 1929 Encyclopædia Britannica, and wrote Die europäische Politik in der Julikrise 1914 (1930) for the Reichstag Commission investigating the cause of the First World War and the German defeat. His papers are held at the Hoover Institution archives at Stanford University.

== Works ==
- An appeal to British fair play. Berlin: Deutsche Verlags Gesellschaft für Politik und Geschichte, 1924.
- 'E.D. Morel; eine Biographie', in Hermann Lutz, ed., E.D. Morel. Der Mann und sein Werk; ein Gedenkbuch, Berlin: Deutsche Verlagsgesellschaft für Politik und Geschichte m.b.H., 1925.
- (ed. with G. P. Gooch and Harold Temperley) Die Britischen Amtlichen Dokumente über den Ursprung des Weltkrieges, 1898–1914, Berlin: Verlagsgesellschaft für Politik und Geschichte, 1926-1928. 11 vol. in 24.
- Lord Grey und der Weltkrieg, ein Schlüssel zum Verständnis der britischen amtlichen Aktenpublikation über den Kriegsausbruch 1914, 1927. Translated by E. W. Dickes as Lord Grey and the World War, 1928.
- German-French unity, basis for European peace, Chicago: H. Regnery Co., 1957

== See also ==
- Article 231 of the Treaty of Versailles
- Causes of World War I
- Centre for the Study of the Causes of the War
- Commission of Responsibilities
- Fischer thesis
- Historiography of the causes of World War I
- War guilt question
