= War guilt question =

Debate about the German responsibility in World War I

European diplomatic alignments shortly before the war. The Ottomans joined with Germany shortly after the war started. Italy remained neutral in 1914 and joined the Entente in 1915.

The war guilt question (German: Kriegsschuldfrage) is the public debate that took place in Germany for the most part during the Weimar Republic, to establish Germany's share of responsibility in the causes of the First World War. Structured in several phases, and largely determined by the impact of the Treaty of Versailles and the attitude of the victorious Allies, this debate also took place in other countries involved in the conflict, such as in the French Third Republic and the United Kingdom.

The war guilt debate motivated historians such as Hans Delbrück, Wolfgang J. Mommsen, Gerhard Hirschfeld, and Fritz Fischer, but also a much wider circle including intellectuals such as Kurt Tucholsky and Siegfried Jacobsohn, as well as the general public. The war guilt question pervaded the history of the Weimar Republic. Founded shortly before the signing of the Treaty of Versailles in June 1919, Weimar embodied this debate until its demise, after which it was subsequently taken up as a campaign argument by the Nazi Party.

While the war guilt question made it possible to investigate the deep-rooted causes of the First World War, although not without provoking a great deal of controversy, it also made it possible to identify other aspects of the conflict, such as the role of the masses and the question of Germany's special path to democracy, the Sonderweg. This debate, which obstructed German political progress for many years, also showed that politicians such as Gustav Stresemann were able to confront the war guilt question by advancing the general discussion without compromising German interests.

A century later, debate continues into the 21st century. The main outlines of the debate include: how much diplomatic and political room to maneuver was available; the inevitable consequences of pre-war armament policies; the role of domestic policy and social and economic tensions in the foreign relations of the states involved; the role of public opinion and their experience of war in the face of organized propaganda; the role of economic interests and top military commanders in torpedoing deescalation and peace negotiations; the Sonderweg theory; and the long-term trends which tend to contextualise the First World War as a condition or preparation for the Second, such as Raymond Aron who views the two world wars as the new Thirty Years' War, a theory reprised by Enzo Traverso in his work.

== Terminology ==
The term war guilt question used in English scholarship is a calque of the German term Kriegsschuldfrage which is a German compound noun made up of Kriegsschuld ("war guilt") + Frage ("question", "issue").

Article 231 of the Treaty of Versailles is at the heart of the issue; also known as the "War Guilt Clause", article 231 delineated German responsibility for the war. English and French were the official languages of the treaty; in French, it was known formally as Article 231 du traité de Versailles or less formally as clause de culpabilité de la guerre ("war guilt clause"); and in German, as the Kriegsschuldartikel ("war guilt" + Artikel, "clause").

Additional terms are seen in English sources, such as war guilt thesis, Versailles war guilt thesis, (Note: For example, the translator of Alfred von Wegerer's Widerlegung der Versailler kriegsschuldthese chose Versailles war guilt thesis in the title of the English version of the book.) and others.

== Background: World War I ==
The question of German war guilt (German: Kriegsschuldfrage) took place in the context of the German defeat by the Allied Powers in World War I, during and after the treaties that established the peace, and continuing on throughout the fifteen-year life of the Weimar Republic in Germany from 1919 to 1933, and beyond.

=== Outbreak of war ===
Hostilities in World War I took place mostly in Europe between 1914 and 11 November 1918. They involved mobilization of 70 million military personnel and resulted in over 20 million military and civilian deaths (exclusive of fatalities from the 1918 Spanish flu pandemic, which accounted for millions more) making it one of the largest and deadliest wars in history. By July 1914, the great powers of Europe were divided into two coalitions: the Triple Entente, later called the "Allied Powers", consisting of France, Russia, and the United Kingdom (and its Empire); and the Triple Alliance of the German Empire, Austria-Hungary, and Italy (the "Central Powers"). After a series of events, ultimatums, and mobilizations, some of them due to interlocking alliances, the German Empire declared war on Russia on 1 August. Within days the other powers followed suit, and before the end of the month the war extended to Japan (siding with the United Kingdom) and, in November, to the Ottoman Empire (with Germany).

After four years of war on multiple fronts in Europe and around the world, an Allied offensive began in August 1918, and the position of Germany and the Central Powers deteriorated, leading them to sue for peace. Initial offers were rejected, and Germany's position became more desperate. Awareness of impending military defeat sparked a revolution in Germany, proclamation of a republic on 9 November 1918, the abdication of Kaiser Wilhelm II, and German surrender, marking the end of Imperial Germany and the beginning of the Weimar Republic. The Central Powers collapsed, with the new Republic capitulating to the victorious Allies and ending hostilities by signing the Armistice of 11 November 1918 in a railroad car.

=== Concluding peace ===
Though hostilities ended on 11 November, a formal state of war continued for months and various treaties were signed amongst the former belligerents. The Paris Peace Conference set terms for the defeated Central Powers, created the League of Nations, rewrote the map of Europe, and under the terms of Article 231 of the Treaty of Versailles, imposed financial penalties in which Germany had to pay reparations of 132 billion gold marks (US$33 billion) to the Allied Powers. In addition, Article 231 stated that "Germany accepts responsibility of Germany and her allies causing all the loss and damage..." but was mistranslated or interpreted in Germany as an admission by Germany of responsibility for causing the war. This, plus the heavy burden of reparations was taken as an injustice and national humiliation, and that Germany had signed "away her honor".

=== Innocence campaign ===
This sense of an unjust and excessive financial burden imposed by the victorious Allied Powers based on a misplaced accusation of blame for having caused the war caused resentment and anger in Germany and resulted in vigorous efforts on multiple fronts to oppose it, including diplomatic, propagandistic, and others. These efforts to deal with the war guilt question began during treaty negotiations in Paris, continued throughout the life of the Weimar Republic, and contributed to the rise of the NSDAP (Nazi) Party—which seized power in 1933, bringing the Weimar Republic to an end—and to 1939 and the outbreak of World War II. Furthermore, the harsh terms of land reduction of Germany after World War I, which reduced Germany's land size by 13 percent, aggravated and intensified tensions between Germany and the European Allied powers, and lead to calls to retake the lost land.

== In the Weimar Republic ==
=== Treaty of Versailles ===
==== Overview and Treaty clauses ====
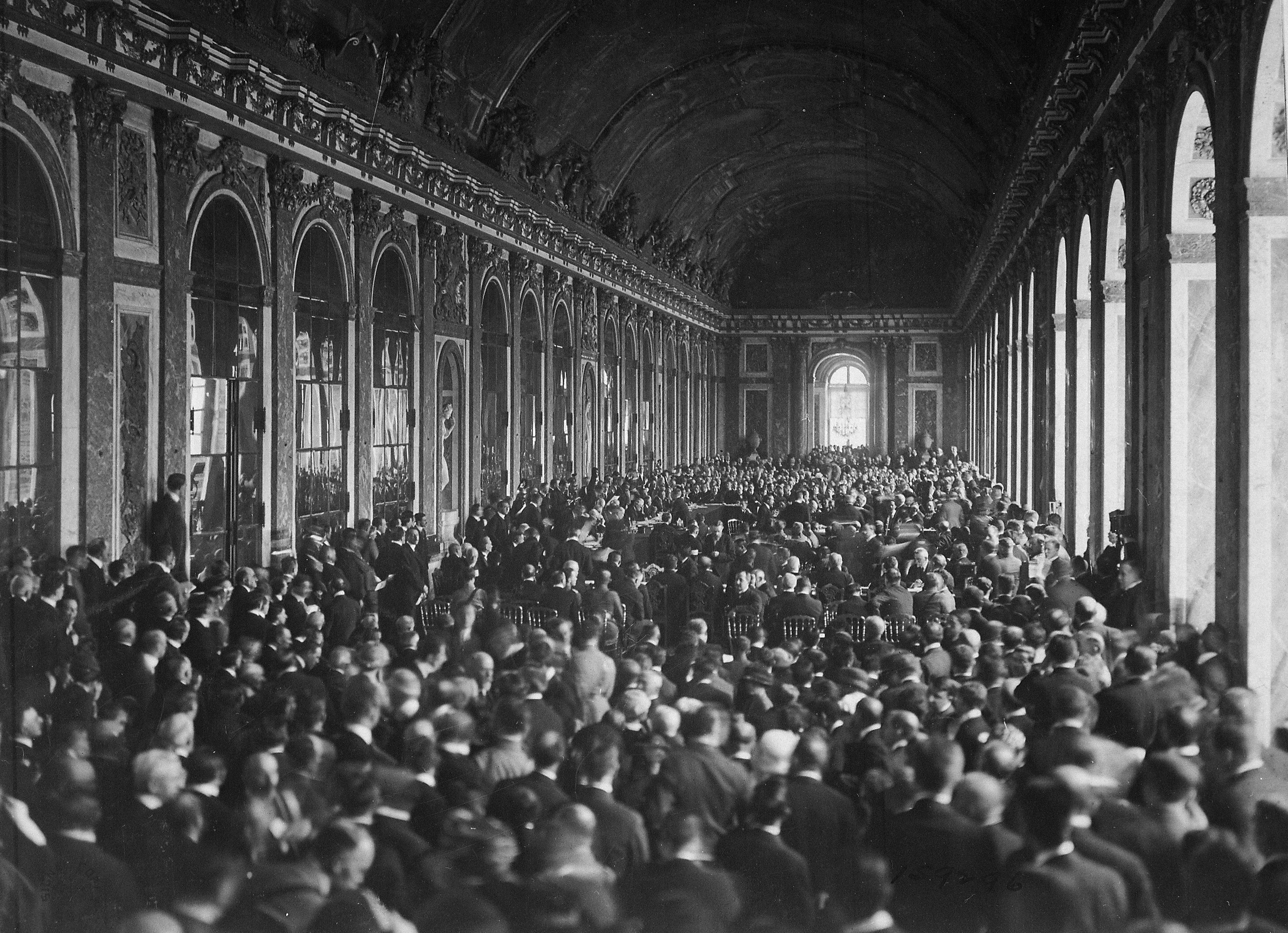
Signature of the Treaty of Versailles in the Hall of Mirrors in 1919

The four great powers led by Woodrow Wilson for the Americans, Georges Clemenceau for the French, David Lloyd George for the British and Vittorio Emanuele Orlando for the Italians met to prepare the peace treaty. Rather than sticking to Wilson's Fourteen Points, the European vision quickly took hold. Decisions were made without Germany, which was excluded from the debates. France, which had served as the main battleground, wanted to ensure a peace of revenge through Clemenceau: "The time has come for a heavy settling of scores". (Note: Clemenceau: ""L'heure est venue du lourd règlement de comptes.") The Treaty of Versailles was above all a "treaty of fear": each former enemy tried to protect his own country. Moreover, the Allies still behaved like enemies when they presented the peace conditions to the German delegation, which finally was invited to attend on 7 May 1919. The deadline for ratification of the treaty was in fifteen days; after that, military operations could resume.

==== War Guilt Clause as the basis for reparations ====
Article 231 of the Treaty states:

The Allied and Associated Governments affirm and Germany accepts the responsibility of Germany and her allies for causing all the loss and damage to which the Allied and Associated Governments and their nationals have been subjected as a consequence of the war imposed upon them by the aggression of Germany and her allies.

— text of Treaty (on Wikisource)

The treaty was interpreted in Germany as assigning the role of aggressor in World War I to Germany and her allies alone. It meant an initial isolation of Germany, which saw itself as the scapegoat for the misdeeds of the other European states before the World War.

The perceived one-sided apportionment of blame to Germany triggered a national debate. The signatures by Hermann Müller and Johannes Bell, who had come to office through the Weimar National Assembly in 1919, fed the stab-in-the-back myth propagated primarily by Paul von Hindenburg and Erich Ludendorff and later by Adolf Hitler.

Historians today take a more nuanced view of the causes of World War I than is expressed in the treaty. Article 231 was not intended to evaluate historical events, but to legally and morally legitimize the peace terms that were disadvantageous to the German Reich. Moreover, the German Empire was to be held financially liable for the damage to land and people that the German imperial troops had caused, especially in France. The Treaty of Versailles therefore laid the groundwork for the reparation claims against the German Reich, in an amount which was not initially determined. The representatives of the German Empire therefore protested Article 231 not merely for reasons of self-justification, but with the aim of undermining the moral basis of the enemy's demands as a whole. The reparations burdened the new republican state; whilst large cash payments of reparations were not made during the period of hyperinflation, their indirect effects were one of several potential causes of the hyperinflation of 1921 to 1923.

==== Impact in Germany ====
Before the treaty was signed on 28 June 1919 the government of the Reich was already talking about an upheaval. President Friedrich Ebert spoke on 6 February 1919 upon the opening of the Reichstag, of "revenge and plans for rape". Germany was stunned by the terms of the treaty. The government claimed it was a ploy to dishonor the German people. The impact of the treaty was first and foremost moral. The moral punishment was a heavier burden to bear than the material one. Treaty clauses that reduced territory, the economy, and sovereignty were seen as a means of making Germany morally grovel. The new Weimar Republic underscored the unprecedented injustice of the treaty, which was described as an act of violence and a Diktat. Article 231, the so-called "War Guilt Clause", put the responsibility for the war on Germany. Germany was required under the treaty to return territories taken and redraw the border between Belgium and Germany.

For Foreign Minister Brockdorff-Rantzau, recognition of Germany as having sole culpability was a lie. He resigned in June 1919 to avoid having to sign the treaty, which bore the seeds of its own rebuttal. Brockdorff-Rantzau had moreover said before the Allies at Versailles: "But also in the manner of waging war, Germany wasn't the only one to make mistakes, each nation made them. I do not wish to respond to accusations with accusations, but if we are asked to make amends, we must not forget the armistice." (Note: Ulrich von Brockdorff-Rantzau, speaking to the Allies at Versailles in 1919: "Mais aussi dans la manière de faire la guerre l'Allemagne n'a pas commis seule des fautes, chaque nation en a commis. Je ne veux pas répondre aux reproches par des reproches, mais, si on nous demande de faire amende honorable, il ne faut pas oublier l'armistice.") The violence with which the treaty was imposed forced the Germans to refute it. By its nature, the treaty deprived the Weimar Republic of any historical confrontation with its own history. The thesis of responsibility derived its strength from the fact that for the first time, a country's responsibility had been officially established.

=== Reactions ===
==== Calls for an International tribunal ====
While representatives of the Independent Social Democratic and the Communist parties tended to emphasize the moral war guilt of the imperial leaders and associated it with social rather than legal consequences, the provisional government in Berlin in early 1919 called for a "neutral" international court to exclude the question of war guilt from the upcoming Paris peace negotiations.

With similar objectives, a number of national liberals, including Max von Baden, Paul Rohrbach, Max Weber, Friedrich Meinecke, Ernst Troeltsch, Lujo Brentano and Conrad Haußmann, founded a "Working Group for a Policy of Justice" (Heidelberg Association) (Note: Working Group for a Policy of Justice: "Arbeitsgemeinschaft für Politik des Rechts"; also known as the Heidelberger Vereinigung ("Heidelberg Association")) on 3 February 1919. It attempted to clarify the question of guilt scientifically, and wanted to have the degree of culpability and violations of international law examined by an arbitration court. It combined this with criticism of the policy of the Entente powers toward Germany and fought their alleged "war guilt lie" (Note: Kriegsschuldlüge, literally: "war guilt lie") even before the Treaty of Versailles was signed. A four-member delegation of the Association was to reject the Allied theories of war guilt on behalf of the Foreign Office and, to this end, handed over a "Memorandum on the Examination of the War Guilt Question" (also called the "Professorial Memorandum") in Versailles.

After the Allies rejected the proposals and demanded instead the extradition of the "war-culpable individuals", (Note: culpable individuals: "Kriegsschuldigen") Otto Landsknecht (MSPD Bavaria) called for a national state tribunal on 12 March 1919, to try them. This was supported by only a few SPD representatives, including Philipp Scheidemann. As a result, ex-general Erich Ludendorff attacked him violently and accused the government representatives of treason in the sense of the stab in the back myth. After the conditions of Versailles became known, they demanded the deletion of the paragraph on the extradition of the "war-guilty".

==== Landsberg project ====
On 12 March 1919 Minister of Justice Otto Landsberg proposed a bill to establish an international tribunal to analyze events before and during the war. This bill originated in a proposal made by the Secretary of State for Foreign Affairs Wilhelm Solf on 29 November 1918. For Solf, the creation of a neutral commission was the only way to bring international peace, to create lasting guarantees against possible wars, and to restore the confidence of the people.

Solf's proposal was based on the analysis of the political situation and the negotiations between the powers in July 1914 and the positions taken by their respective governments. Solf laid the foundations for a neutral scientific research that should eventually provide a "complete and faithful picture of reality". For this reason, he proposed to publish all the acts of the powers involved in the war, even going so far as wishing to question the personalities who determined the history of their own countries at the time of the outbreak of war as well as any witnesses having important evidence. Few social-democratic representatives supported the project, one exception being Philipp Scheidemann. The Landsberg project was rejected by the Allies, who demanded that the major German war criminals be handed over to them, and abandoned this idea in 1922.

=== Propaganda response ===
At the beginning of World War I, all of the main combatants published bound versions of diplomatic correspondence, with greater or lesser accuracy, partly for domestic consumption and also partly to influence other actors about the responsibility for the war. The German White Book was the first of these to appear, and was published in 1914, with numerous other color books appearing shortly thereafter by each of the major powers.

After the conclusion of the war and the draconian aspects of the Treaty of Versailles, Germany launched various propaganda efforts to counter the imputation of guilt upon Germany by the victorious Allies, starting with the War Guilt Section (Kriegsschuldreferat), run by the Foreign Ministry (Auswartiges Amt). Two additional units were created in April 1921, in an effort to appear to be independent of the ministry: the Center for the Study of the Causes of the War (Zentralstelle zur Erforschung der Kriegsursachen), and the Working Committee of German Associations Arbeitsausschuss.

In addition, the Weimar National Assembly established an inquiry into guilt for the war on 20 August 1919. Its four subcommittees were tasked with examining the causes of the war, what brought about its loss, what missed opportunities for peace had presented themselves, and if international laws had been broken. The inquiry continued for thirteen years, until the Nazi Party victory in the election of July 1932. The inquiry's findings were hampered by lack of cooperation from both the government and the military and were in general watered down and deflected blame away from Germany.

==== War Guilt Section ====
The position of the SPD party majority, which was tied to its own approval of the war from 1914 to 1918 and left the imperial administrative apparatus almost untouched, continued to determine the domestic political reappraisal of the war. With an eye to the Paris Peace Conference (1919–1920), that began on 18 January 1919, by late 1918 the Foreign Office had already established the "Bülow Special Office" (Spezialbüro von Bülow), named after former Reich Chancellor Bernhard von Bülow and which had been set up after the armistice. Its role was to collect documents from various sources, including the Bolsheviks, for use by to counter the Allied allegations at Versailles. The documents collected by the Special Bureau were used in German negotiations in Paris, as part of the "Professors' Memorandum" presented to the allies on 27 May 1919. It was probably written by von Bülow, but signed by the professors for "patriotic reasons". In 1919, this became the "War Guilt Section" (Kriegsschuldreferat), and its purpose was to counter the war guilt accusation of the Allies.

In the same way that color books did, the Office collected documents to counter accusations that Germany and Austria-Hungary had planned the world war and had "intentionally" disregarded the international law of war. This was also intended to provide foreign historians and journalists with exculpatory material to influence public opinion abroad.

The department also acted as an "internal censorship office", determined which publications were to be praised or criticized, and prepared official statements for the Reich Chancellor on the subject of war guilt. Theodor Schieder later wrote about this: "In its origin, the research was virtually a continuation of the war by other means." (Note: Theodor Schieder: "Die Forschung war im Ursprung geradezu eine Fortsetzung des Krieges mit anderen Mitteln.")

However, documentation from the War Guilt Section was not considered by the delegates of the victorious powers at the Paris Conference or in the years that followed. The only concession from the Allies, was waiving their demand for extradition of the German "main war criminals" after 1922.

==== Center for the Study of the Causes of the War ====
The Center for the Study of the Causes of the War (Zentralstelle zur Erforschung der Kriegsursachen) was a "clearinghouse for officially desirable views on the outbreak of the war" and for circulating these views faster and more broadly. The center was created by the War Guilt Section in order to bring to the public documents which would unify public opinion towards the official line. It was prolific, with Wegerer writing more than 300 articles.

==== Working Committee of German Associations ====
The Working Committee of German Associations (Arbeitsausschuss Deutscher Verbände (Note: Arbeitsausschuss Deutscher Verbände: not to be confused with the Vereinigte Vaterländische Verbände Deutschlands.))) was an umbrella organization founded in 1921 by the German Foreign Ministry, as part of an attempt to gain control over German patriotic organizations which were calling for a revision of the Treaty of Versailles and its war guilt clause. It had a board of directors and a business office under Dr. Hans Draeger, and had about 2,000 member organizations in the 1920s.

Its mission was to forge a uniform public opinion about the war by moderating extreme protestations of innocence on the right, and of acquiescence in accusations of guilt on the left. In practice, this amounted to silencing those admitting any guilt on the part of Germany, with the intent of strengthening German resolve at home to seek revision of the treaty.

To further this aim, the Committee held seminars, conducted special workshops for the press, unions, and liaison personnel; and held exhibitions, conventions, and rallies. The Committee exploited and distributed the War Guilt Section's documentary collections, and circulated works of foreign revisionists from the United States and Britain. They did not solely address the question of war guilt, but also of reparations, armaments, colonies, the Rhineland issue, minorities, the League of Nations, through guides, pamphlets, and broadsides. They used works of foreign revisionists to strengthen the case for exculpation at home, while striving to maintain a united front at home in order to influence revisionists abroad, such as the American Harry Elmer Barnes.

=== Dealing with the issue and responsibilities ===
==== Potsdam Reichsarchiv ====
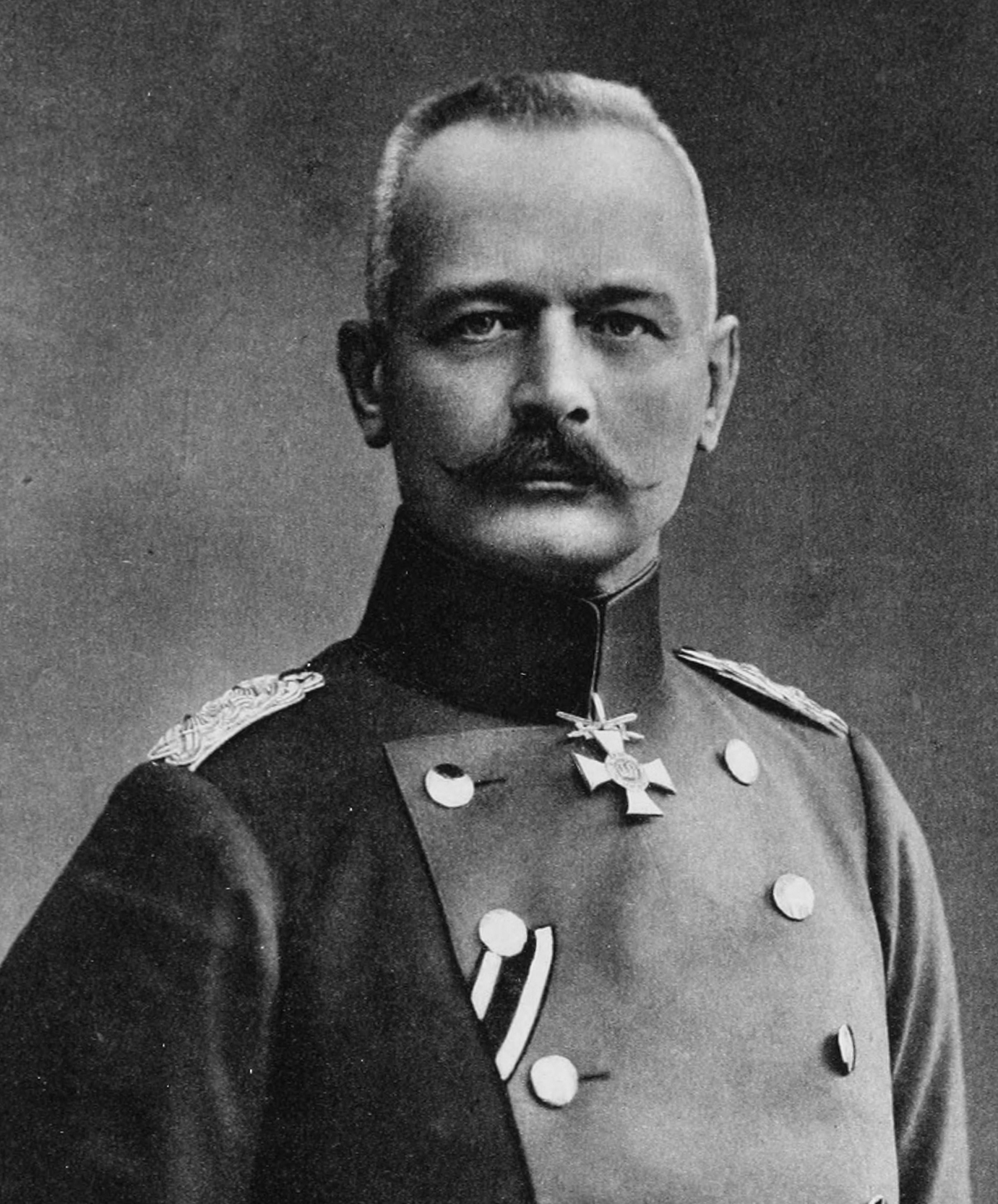
Erich von Falkenhayn

From 1914 on, the German army exerted a great influence on German historiography. The General Staff was responsible for writing war reports until 1918, when the Potsdam Reichsarchiv, founded by Hans von Seeckt, took over. The Foreign Office conducted the historiography of the Weimar Republic in parallel with the Reichswehr and its administrative staff, who were largely opposed to democracy.

The Reichsarchiv also worked to refute German responsibility for the war, and for war crimes. To this end, it produced technical reports for the parliamentary commission and published eighteen volumes on the subject of "The First World War 1914–1918" from 1925 until it was taken over by the German Federal Archives (Bundesarchiv) in 1956. Until 1933, the methods of historical criticism used were:

- methodical interrogation of witnesses and analysis of reports from subordinate military services where collections of military mail become new historical sources.
- Some of the criticism of the Supreme Army Command, especially against Helmuth von Moltke and Erich von Falkenhayn, was officially admitted, which relieved their successors, Hindenburg and Ludendorff, of their responsibility.
- The primacy of government policy and the traditional German attraction to "great leaders" contradicts, in part unintentionally, the logic of the legend which arose from fateful forces, of non-responsibility for the war.

Nevertheless, some aspects remain to be studied, such as the influence of the economy, the masses, or ideology, on the course of the war. The evolution towards a "total war" is a concept that is still unknown.

==== Acknowledging the question ====
While most of the German media denounced the treaty, others believed that the question of responsibility for the war should be dealt with at a moral level. One example was Die Weltbühne ("World Stage"), a left-liberal journal founded in November 1918. According to its editor, Siegfried Jacobsohn, it is absolutely necessary to expose the faults of pre-war German policy and to acknowledge responsibility in order to achieve a prosperous democracy and a retreat from militarism.

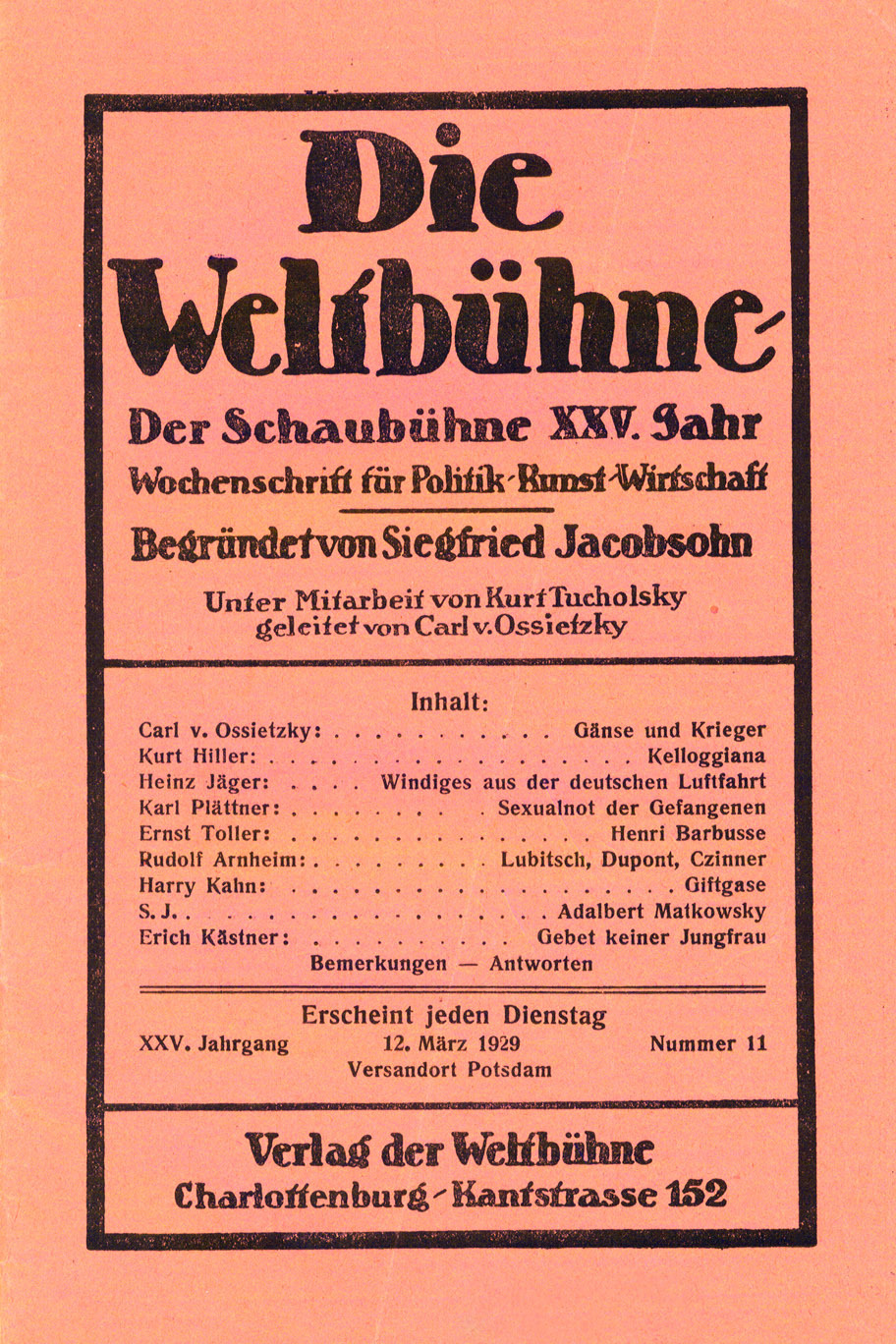
Copy of Die Weltbühne from 12 March 1929

On 8 May 1919, a few days after the bloody repression of the Bavarian Soviet Republic, Heinrich Ströbel wrote in Die Weltbühne:

No, people in Germany are still far from any kind of recognition. Just as one refuses to acknowledge guilt, so also does one stubbornly refuse to believe in the good will of others. One still sees only greed, intrigue, and malice in others, and the most invigorating hope is that the day will come when these dark forces will be made to serve their own interests. The rulers of today still haven't learned anything from the world war; the old illusion, the old megalomania, still dominates them. (Note: Ströbel quotation: Nein, man ist in Deutschland noch weit ab von jeder Erkenntnis. Wie man das Schuldbekenntnis verweigert, so verweigert man auch dem guten Willen der Andern verstockt den Glauben. Man sieht noch immer nur die Gier, die Ränke, die Arglist der Andern, und die belebendste Hoffnung ist, daß dereinst der Tag komme, der diese dunklen Mächte den eigenen Interessen dienstbar mache. Noch haben die heute Regierenden nichts aus dem Weltkrieg gelernt, noch beherrscht sie der alte Wahn, der alte Machtwahn.)

— Heinrich Ströbel, Der alte Wahn, in: Die Weltbühne of 8 May 1919, p. 524

Carl von Ossietzky and Kurt Tucholsky, contributors to the review, supported the same point of view. On 23 July 1919, Tucholsky wrote a review of Emil Ludwig's book July 14:

The people did not want war, no people wanted it; through the narrow-mindedness, negligence, and malice of the diplomats this "stupidest of all wars" has come about. (Note: Kurt Tucholsky in 1919: Die Völker haben keinen Krieg gewollt, kein Volk hat ihn gewollt; durch die Borniertheit, Fahrlässigkeit und Böswilligkeit der Diplomaten ist es zu diesem »dümmsten aller Kriege« gekommen.)

— Kurt Tucholsky, cited in: Kritiken und Rezensionen, Gesammelte Schriften 1907-1935

A pacifist movement was formed in the Weimar Republic, which demonstrated on 1 August, anti-war day. Its members came from different backgrounds: left-wing parties, liberal and anti-militarist groups, former soldiers, officers and generals. They took on the question of responsibility. The role of their women in their pacifist transformation is also worth noting. Among them: Hans-Georg von Beerfelde, Moritz von Egidy, Major Franz Carl Endres, the lieutenant captains Hans Paasche and Heinz Kraschutzki, Colonel Kurt von Tepper-Laski, Fritz von Unruh but also Generals Berthold Deimling, Max von Montgelas and Paul von Schoenaich.

At the first pacifist congress in June 1919, when a minority led by Ludwig Quidde repudiated the Treaty of Versailles, the German League for Human Rights and the Center for International Law made the question of responsibility a central theme. The independent Social Democrats and Eduard Bernstein were moving in the same direction and managed to change the representation put forward by the Social Democrats that war was a necessary condition for a successful social revolution. This led to the reunification of a minority of the party with the Social Democrats in 1924 and the inclusion of some pacifist demands in the 1925 Heidelberg Program

==== Walter Fabian ====
Walter Fabian, journalist and social-democratic politician, published Die Kriegsschuldfrage in 1925. His book, although out of print a year after publication, was one of the books banned after Adolf Hitler came to power and examines the events that led to the war. The general opinion of German historians at the time was that responsibility for the outbreak was shared among various countries, of which Germany was only one, and that Germany had made no advance war preparations, certainly not for a long war. Fabian's book went against the general opinion, and acknowledged that Germany was largely to blame for the outbreak of war because of the attitude of its leading politicians.

===== Pre-war policy =====
Map of Bismarck's alliances

1 / Dual Alliance (1879)	2 / League of the Three Emperors (1881)	4 / Reinsurance Treaty (1887)

Fabian's first field of research was the domination of pre-war politics by Bismarck's politics of alliances (Bündnispolitik), which Fabian characterizes as "Europe's downfall". (Note: Europe's downfall: "Europas Verhängnis".) The system of alliances set up in the summer of 1914 and its complexity made the outbreak of war inevitable. Otto von Bismarck had recognized the usefulness of this policy at the time; Germany's central location in Europe pushed politicians like Bismarck to form alliances to avoid the nightmare scenario of possible encirclement. After having ensured the neutrality of Russia and Austria-Hungary in 1881 with the singing of the League of the Three Emperors, the Reinsurance Treaty was signed in 1887. The isolation of France was the basis of Bismarckian policy in order to be able to ensure the security of the Reich.

===== The July Crisis and mobilization =====
The assassination of Archduke Franz Ferdinand of Austria served as a catalyst for war and "reflected the sharp tension that prevailed between Austria and Hungary for a number of years" (Note: Fabian: "Ausdruck der scharfen Spannung, die seit einer Reihe von Jahren zwischen Österreich-Ungarn herrschte.") The carte blanche given by William II to the Austrian emperor had, according to Fabian, also other reasons, in particular the willingness of Germany to wage a preventive war for fear of Russian mobilization. In marginal notes on a report by German ambassador Heinrich von Tschirschky, William II wrote "The situation with the Serbs must be dealt with, and quickly. (Note: William II: "Mit den Serben muss aufgeräumt werden und zwar bald.".) Walter Fabian judged the ultimatum addressed to Serbia to be impossible: "Austria wanted the ultimatum to be rejected; Germany, which according to Tirpitz already knew the main points of it on July 13, wanted the same thing." (Note: Fabian: "Österreich wollte die Nichtannahme des Ultimatums, Deutschland, das laut Tirpitz bereits am 13. Juli die wichtigsten Punkte kannte, wollte das gleiche.")

Fabian showed that Germany had an undeniable share of responsibility in the war. Even if the emperor and chancellor Theobald von Bethmann Hollweg tried to defuse events at the last moment, the army threw its full weight into the effort in order to force the situation. Chief of Staff von Moltke sent a telegram in which he stated that Germany would mobilize, but William II asserted that there was no longer any reason to declare war since Serbia accepted the ultimatum. Various futile attempts at peace were made, such as the proposal of 27 July to hold a four-power conference.

===== Supremacy of the army =====
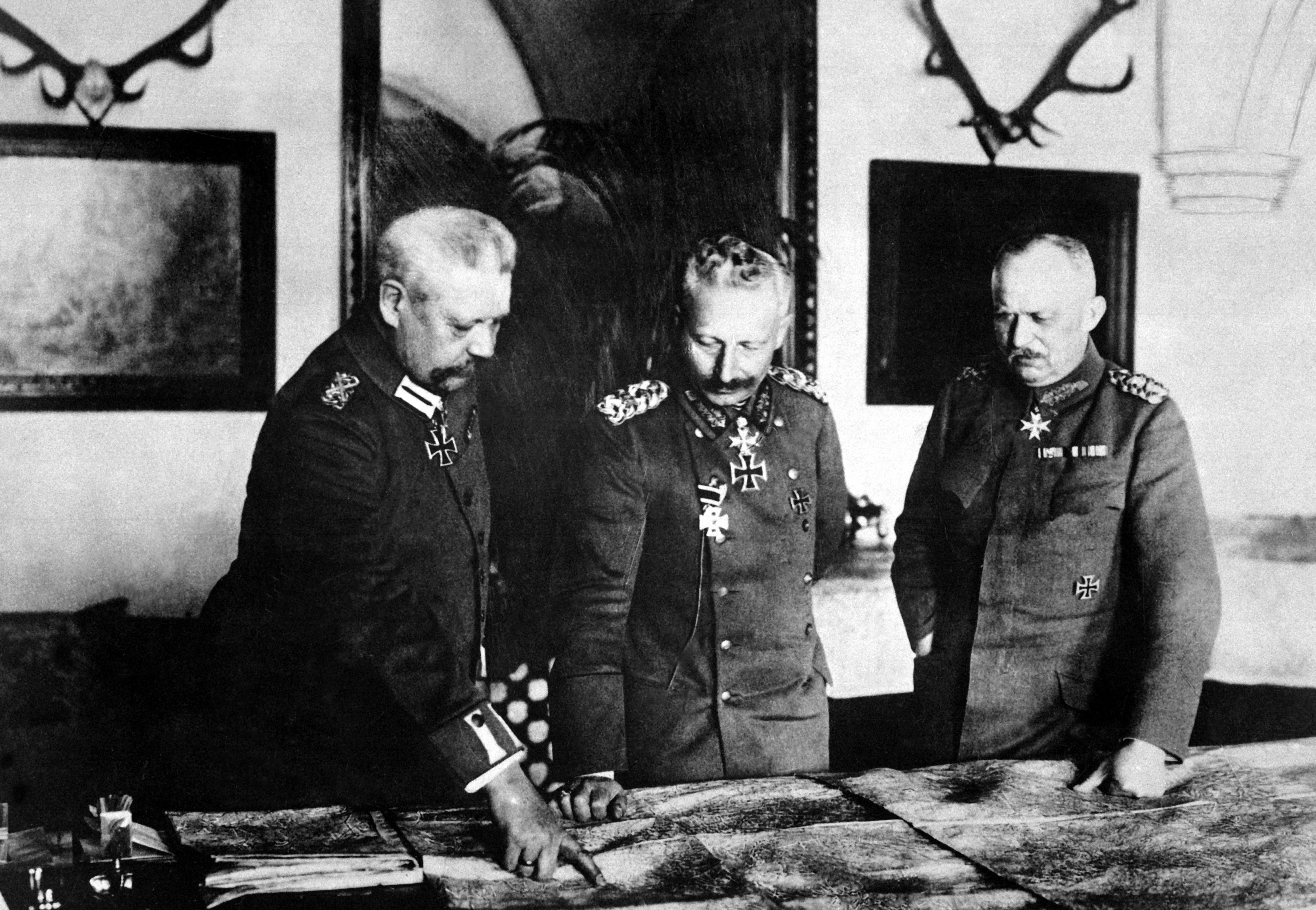
Emperor Wilhelm II, Hindenburg and Ludendorff. From 1916, the two generals took over the military and political affairs of Germany.

"In Germany, too, only the military point of view was decisive." (Note: Original from Fabian (1926): "Auch in Deutschland entschied nur noch der militärische Gesichtspunkt.")

The role of the army explains the mechanisms of the war guilt question. The roots of military supremacy are to be found in Prussia and in the system, established by Bismarck, in which Prussian militarism gained importance in the years after the unification of the Reich. As Helmuth von Moltke the Younger showed, in various wars such as the Franco-Prussian War of 1870, the Chief of the General Staff wielded great power.

In any other state, the army and navy are nothing but instruments of foreign policy. In militarized Germany, they had a special position; since Bismarck no longer stood in their way, they were more powerful than an Imperial Chancellor and far more popular than all diplomacy. (Note: Original from Fabian (1926): "In jedem anderen Staate waren Militär und Marine nichts als Instrumente der auswärtigen Politik. In dem militarisierten Deutschland hatten sie eine Sonderstellung, waren sie, seit Bismarck ihnen nicht mehr im Wege stand, mächtiger als ein Reichskanzler und weit beliebter als alle Diplomatie.")

— Walter Fabian, Fabian (1926)

When war broke out, the military staff intended to emerge victorious within six weeks, thanks to the Schlieffen Plan. Generals Hindenburg and Ludendorff, having come out of retirement, enjoyed great prestige. In 1916, Hindenburg was appointed Chief of Staff, and in 1917, a monumental statue was erected in Berlin in his honor. William II gradually lost his power, to the benefit of the two generals, who took the country in hand. Ludendorff proposed the institution of a compulsory labor service to increase yields, which he believed to be insufficient. Bethmann Hollweg refused, but the Patriotic Auxiliary Service (Note: Patriotic Auxiliary Service: in German: Vaterländische Hilfsdienst; see the Auxiliary Services Act (1916) which established it.) was established on 5 December 1917. On 13 July 1917, the Chancellor was forced to resign under pressure from the two generals, who even received the political parties on 14 July 1917.

At the opening of armistice negotiations, Germany was in the grip of revolutionary uprisings. A commission, presided over by Matthias Erzberger, was set up to sign the armistice treaty at Armistice Clearing in Compiègne. Instead of German military personnel carrying out the signing, civilian delegates, representing the Weimar Republic, which had been established only two days earlier, signed for Germany. As the generals refused to bear responsibility for the defeat, the general staff circulated an image of the republic as a symbol of defeat. This maneuver was all the more underhanded since Ludendorff had recognized the need for an armistice. Colonel Von Thaer also stated that on 1 October 1918 Ludendorff considered himself defeated.

Whereas military propaganda held the socialists responsible for the defeat, Fabian asserted that the defeat was due to the failure of possible peace initiatives. On 21 December 1916, President Woodrow Wilson made a peace proposal. It was refused by Germany, which did not want to hear about American mediation. On 31 January 1917, Chancellor Bethmann Hollweg sent a secret note to Wilson to achieve peace. The German conditions were too high for this initiative to be considered a serious one. Moreover, it would have meant renouncing submarine warfare, which the army did not want under any circumstances since it represented the possibility of destroying 40% of British tonnage. The army did not want a peace in which Germany would be the loser. One goal of their submarine warfare was to pressure Great Britain into suing for peace and allowing Germany to set its own conditions. The only consequence would be the entry of the United States into the war.

=== Further evolution ===
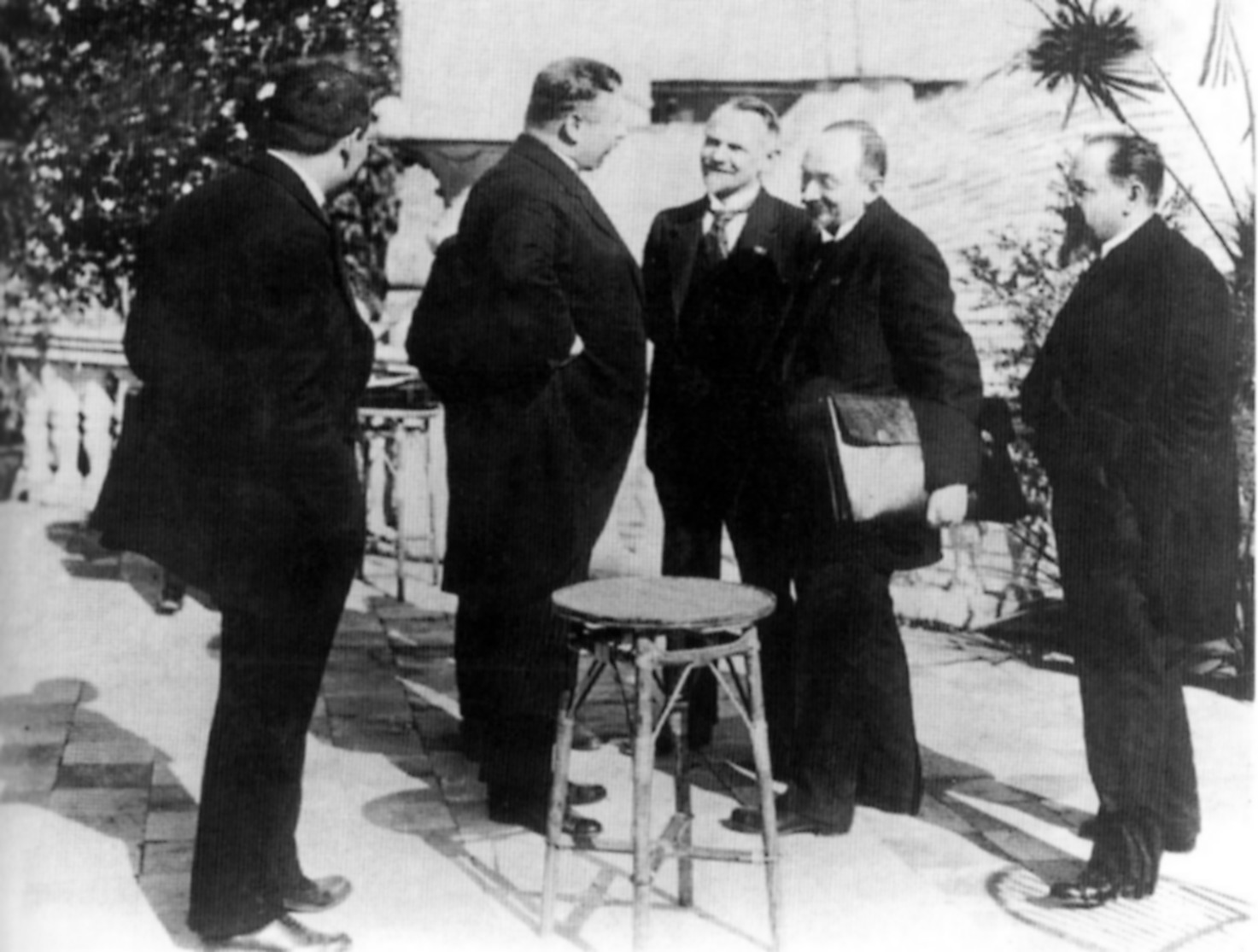
Joseph Wirth, at the signing of the Treaty of Rapallo

On 16 April 1922, the Treaty of Rapallo with Soviet Russia was signed, reducing Germany's isolation. Implementation of the treaty was considered treason by some on the far right, and one of the proponents of this policy, Walther Rathenau, was assassinated on 24 June 1922 in Berlin. Matthias Erzberger had been murdered a year earlier.

After the 1922 Treaty of Rapallo, Germany renewed contacts with other countries. The borders that were defined by the Treaty of Versailles were also at the heart of the grievances of the German government, which requested their revision.

In October 1925, the Locarno Treaties were signed. The signatories pledged to guarantee Germany's borders with France and Belgium, which meant that Germany accepted the loss of Alsace-Lorraine and Eupen-Malmedy. The war guilt question did not block its foreign policy. Foreign Minister Gustav Stresemann, a man of compromise but above all a defender of German interests, succeeded in getting Germany to join the League of Nations on 8 September 1926. If international relations were calmed, Franco-German relations were also calmed. Stresemann and Aristide Briand shared the 1926 Nobel Peace Prize for their work on the Locarno Treaties.

=== Decline of the Social Democrats ===
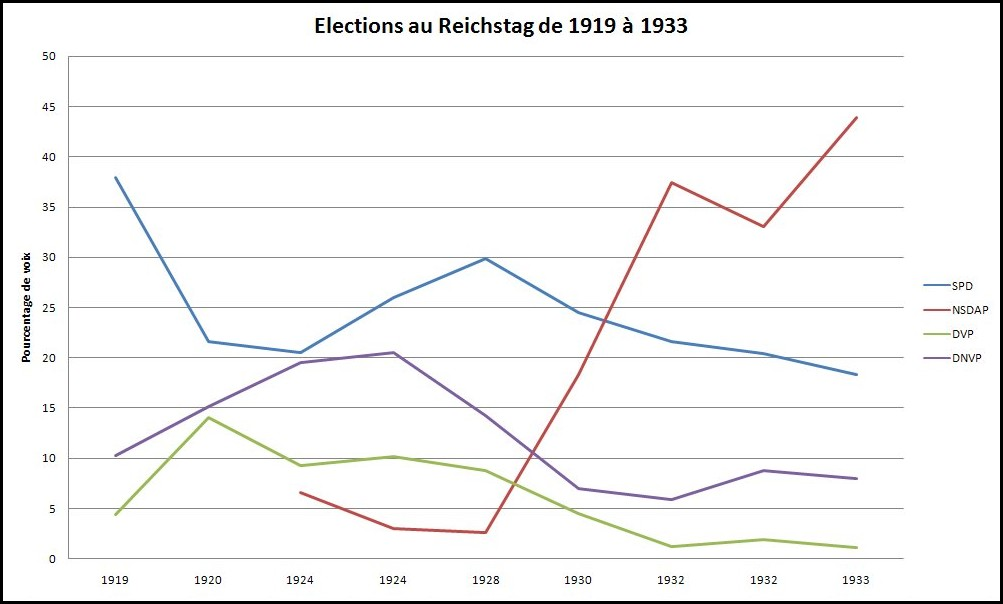
Graph showing the SPD's losses after 1919 to conservative parties such as the DVP and DNVP, and from 1928 to the NSDAP

The refusal to admit the collapse of the German army gave way to the stab-in-the-back myth, which alleged that the government formed by the socialists betrayed the army by signing the armistice while still in a state of combat. German nationalism, incarnated by the defeated military, did not recognize the legitimacy of the Weimar Republic. This legend weakened the Social Democratic Party through slander campaigns based on various allegations: namely, that the SDP not only betrayed the army and Germany by signing the armistice, but also repressed the Spartacist uprising, proclaimed the republic, and refused (for some of its members) to vote for war credits in 1914. Hindenburg spoke of the "division and relaxation of the will to victory" (Note: "Spaltung und Lockerung des Siegeswillens".) driven by internal party interests. Socialists are labeled, the "Vaterlandslose" ("the homeless"). Hindenburg continued to emphasize the innocence of the army, stating: "The good core of the Army is not to blame. Its performance is as admirable as that of the officer corps. (Note: Hindenburg: "Den guten Kern des Heers trifft keine Schuld. Seine Leistung ist ebenso bewunderungswürdig wie die des Offizierkorps.")

This slander had electoral consequences for the Social Democrats. In the 1920 election, the percentage of SPD seats in the Reichstag was 21.6 per cent, down from 38 per cent in 1919. Right-wing parties gradually gained ground, such as the German National People's Party (DNVP), which won 15.1 per cent of the seats compared to only 10.3 per cent in 1919. For five years, the SPD was absent from all governments between 30 November 1923 and 29 June 1928. According to Jean-Pierre Gougeon, the decline of the SPD was due to the fact that it had not sufficiently democratized the country since the proclamation of the Weimar Republic. Judges, civil servants and high-ranking civil servants had not been replaced, and they often remained loyal to the emperor, all the more so since military propaganda blamed the republic for his abdication.

=== Rise of the National Socialists ===
Fabian foresaw the consequences that the war guilt question could have for the rise of extremism, which had been awakened in Germany as early as 1920 with the creation of the Nazi Party (NSDAP), which would make the Treaty of Versailles and the question of responsibility its trademark issue: "But the war guilt question can also lead to the poisoning of relations between peoples, it can become a weapon forged for the hand of international nationalism." (Note: Fabian: "Aber die Kriegsschuldfrage kann auch zu einer Vergiftung der Völkerbeziehungen führen, kann zu einer Waffe in der Hand des internationalen Nationalismus umgeschmiedet werden.")

The Working Committee of German Associations gave its support to Adolf Hitler as early as 1936, in particular through its president, Heinrich Schnee, for whom the "rescue of the fatherland" required "the joint action of all parties on national soil, including the NSDAP".

From the second point of the NSDAP's 25-point program, Adolf Hitler demanded that the German people be treated in the same way as other nations and demanded the abrogation of the Treaties of Versailles and of Saint-Germain-en-Laye. For him, "all German laws are nothing more than the anchoring of the peace treaties". (Note: Hitler, in NSDAP 25-point program: "...die gesamte deutsche Gesetzgebung nichts anderes als eine Verankerung der Friedensverträgereference.") Hitler took part in the war and was very much marked by the military collapse. Antisemitism also made its appearance as did attacks against personalities of Jewish origin, such as the one against Walther Rathenau or Maximilian Harden in 1922. Hyperinflation due to reparations, the economic downturn after the 1929 stock market crash, and the resulting unemployment became campaign themes for NSDAP supporters.

The war guilt issue strengthened right-wing extremist movements and led to a radicalization of German society and eventually to the fall of the Weimar Republic.

== National Socialism ==
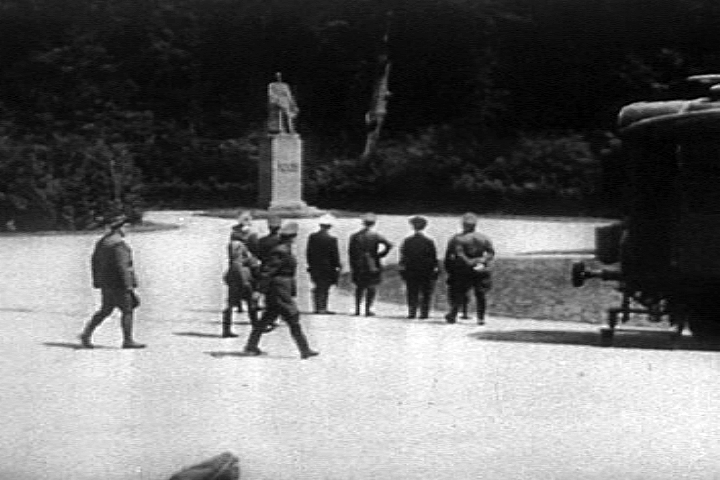
Hitler before the statue of Ferdinand Foch, a return to the First World War

Adolf Hitler claimed in Mein Kampf in 1925 that all Germans had been for the war:

The fight of the year 1914 was certainly not forced upon the masses, good God! but desired by the entire people. (Note: "The fight of the year 1914:" Der Kampf des Jahres 1914 wurde den Massen, wahrhaftiger Gott, nicht aufgezwungen, sondern von dem gesamten Volke selbst begehrt.)

Nevertheless, he saw the initiative for the world war on the side of the Entente, so that the German war guilt for him consisted in the failure of a preventive war:

The fault of the German government was that, in order to keep the peace, it always missed the favorable hours for striking out, got entangled in the alliance for the preservation of world peace and thus finally became the victim of a world coalition, which precisely opposed the pressure for the preservation of world peace with a resolute determination in favor of world war. (Note: Die Schuld der deutschen Regierung war dabei, daß sie, um den Frieden nur ja zu erhalten, die günstigen Stunden des Losschlagens immer versäumte, sich in das Bündnis zur Erhaltung des Weltfriedens verstrickte und so endlich das Opfer einer Weltkoalition wurde, die eben dem Drang nach Erhaltung des Weltfriedens die Entschlossenheit zum Weltkrieg entgegenstemmte.)

In 1930, the Reichstag faction of the Nazi party demanded, as an amendment to the Law for the Protection of the Republic (Note: Law for the Protection of the Republic: Originally passed in July 1922 after the assassination of Foreign Minister Walther Rathenau by right-wing extremists, the law set up special courts to address politically motivated violence, and established severe penalties for political murders, and government authority to ban extremist groups.) that the claim that Germany had caused World War I should be punished with the death penalty; and so should other acts such as conscientious objection, demands for disarmament, the "disparagement of living and dead war heroes," and the "disparagement of national symbols" as "military treason" (Note: "Military treason": from Wehrverrat, a non-existent word in German, and used in quotation marks in German text where it appears, but readily understandable as a compound noun.) This met with enthusiastic approval from some prominent legal scholars of the time, such as Georg Dahm. The amendments were, however, not made.

After the Nazi seizure of power in 1933, a "Führer word" (Note: Führerwort: sayings of the Führer; these more or less had the force of law.) by Hitler ended the German war guilt debate following the previously propagated "war guilt lie" and in line with British historians of the appeasement era:

Neither the Kaiser, nor the government, nor the people wanted this war. (Note: Weder der Kaiser, noch die Regierung, noch das Volk haben diesen Krieg gewollt.)

— Adolf Hitler

Alfred von Wegerer quoted Hitler's statement in the Berliner Monatshefte in December 1934 and linked it to the expectation that at last the "honor of the nation", which had been "most grievously violated" by the Treaty of Versailles, would be "fully restored".

Under the new political guidelines, German historians no longer asked about war guilt but about the politically necessary steps to effectively prevent a new world war allegedly imposed from outside. Julius Hashagen wrote retrospectively about the Berliner Monatshefte in 1934: "... under the masterful and meritorious leadership of the journal and its staff," German war guilt research had made "considerable progress". Most military historians employed at the Reich Archives welcomed the suppression of the war guilt question in favor of the military war historiography that began in 1934, but the Nazi regime's measures, which they had initially welcomed, were soon directed against some of the historians associated with the journal.

On 30 January 1937, Hitler revoked the German signature to the "war guilt article" 231 of the Treaty of Versailles. On 30 January 1939 he justified his war policy in the Reichstag with the announcement:

I want to be a prophet again today: If international financial Jewry inside and outside of Europe should succeed once more in plunging the peoples of the world into a war, the result would not be the Bolshevization of the earth and thus the victory of Jewry, but the annihilation of the Jewish race in Europe.

In the early summer of 1940, the Nazi regime presented the rapid conquest of Belgium and France as the true end of the First World War, transforming the defeat of 1918 into a delayed victory. Liberal historians like Friedrich Meinecke also hailed the victories as a personal gratification.

== In other countries ==
The public media battle didn't wait for the end of the war in countries involved in the war. As their armies began to clash, the opposing governments engaged in a media battle attempting to avoid blame for causing the war, and casting blame on other countries, through the publication of carefully selected documents, basically consisting of diplomatic exchanges, selected and ordered to cast them in the best light possible. Sometimes, according to other combatants, they were misleading, or even falsified.

The German White Book (Note: German title of the White Book was: "Das Deutsche Weißbuch über den Ausbruch des deutsch-russisch-französischen Krieges" ("The German White Book about the Outbreak of the German-Russian-French War").) appeared on 4 August 1914, and was the first such book to come out. It contains 36 documents. (Note: The German White Book was translated and published in English the same year.) Within a week, most other combatant countries had published their own book, each named with a different color name. France held off until 1 December 1914, when they finally published their Yellow Book. Other combatants in the war published similar books: the Blue Book of Britain, the Orange Book of Russia, the Yellow Book of France, and the Austro-Hungarian Red Book, the Belgian Grey Book, and the Serbian Blue Book.

=== France ===
France's war propaganda, which since 1914 had seen the country as long threatened by Germany and finally attacked under a pretext, initially continued to have the same effect after the end of the war: the official view of history was shaped by works such as the Senate Report by Émile Bourgeois and Georges Pagès or former prime minister Raymond Poincaré's document How the 1914 War Broke Out. (Note: Title of Poincaré's text: Comment fut déclarée la Guerre de 1914)

France's government under Georges Clemenceau had insisted in 1919 on the contractual establishment of sole guilt on the part of Germany and Austria-Hungary. The payment of reparations for war damage incurred and the permanent weakening of the arch-enemy were the principal motives of this attitude, and were taken up by the public: '"The Krauts will pay for everything!" (Note: 'Le boche payera tout.') This was perceived by the French public not only as a justification for reparations, but also as a demonstrative statement of political and moral guilt. The Socialists, too, saw only a partial responsibility (Note: responsabilité partagée) on the part of the French in the war and also insisted on Germany's civil liability under Article 231 of the Treaty of Versailles.

When Germany was about to be admitted to the League of Nations in 1925, war guilt was again discussed in France. At that time, the French Yellow Book and the Senate Report were reissued. In contrast, Pierre Renouvin's 1925 book on the July Crisis, Origines immédiates de la guerre demonstrated falsifications in the Yellow Book, but received little attention. Parallel to the German attempts to show documentary evidence of the innocence of the German Empire in the outbreak of war, the Documents Diplomatiques Français (1871-1914) were published by the French in three series from 1929 to 1959.

At the German Historians Conferences of the 1950s, German and French historians jointly advocated a version of Lloyd George's thesis that none of the governments involved had deliberately sought war. In his 1993 book, Mark B. Hayne advanced the thesis of substantial French complicity. In order to thwart the Schlieffen Plan, Poincaré and his associates had pushed for the quickest possible Russian mobilization. Stefan Schmidt came to a similar conclusion in 2009 in his research in the Paris archives. The Fischer debate triggered a self-critical view in France of French policy in the years after 1914. Georges-Henri Soutou criticized Fischer for considering German war aims in isolation from those of the other powers and for neglecting the interactions involved. He also put into perspective the importance of Bethmann Hollweg's Septemberprogramm, on which Fischer based his thesis of continuous German planning for hegemony. A position counter to this was held by Marc Ferro. Following Fischer, and also French and Russian sources, Ferro found the chief responsibility lay with Germany and secondarily with the Entente powers. Germany had the most pronounced desire to wage war.

=== Great Britain ===
Until about 1955, the British debate on war guilt fluctuated between a determination of Germany's sole guilt and an equal share of war guilt, or innocence, of all the powers involved. The change in historical viewpoint was strongly influenced by current policies toward Germany.

In the summer of 1914, opinions on war guilt in Britain were in part critical of the government and pacifist, partly fatalist or Social Darwinist. After the German invasion of Belgium, Germany alone was considered to have caused the war, even by Prime Minister H. H. Asquith. Thus Leonard Hobhouse, who only shortly earlier had accused the government of not having done enough to prevent the war, now pleaded for "national unity." Oxford historians also placed sole blame on Germany in 1914 and stressed that no propaganda was involved in taking an uncritical view of the Triple Entente's color books. William G. S. Adams, who saw the war as a "struggle of liberty against militarism," tried to prove that Germany had deliberately risked a "European conflagration" in order to force England to honor its "moral obligations" to France and Belgium.

Analogous to the German document collections, eleven volumes of British Documents on the Origin of the war 1898-1914 were published in Britain from 1926 to 1938. Germany's welcome entry into the League of Nations then triggered a turnaround. Now, British historians such as Paul Kennedy, Michael Howard, and Jonathan Steinberg took into account hitherto neglected economic, social-historical, and military-historical aspects as well as the role of Austria-Hungary. John Gooch, in Recent Revelations of European Diplomacy, denied that "anyone wanted the war at all." William H. Dawson, who shortly before had seen "German militarism" as the sole cause of the war, now singled out the Alliance system as the culprit. Raymond Beazley wrote as late as 1933:

Germany had not plotted the Great War, had not desired a war, and had made genuine, though belated and ill-organized efforts to avert it.

— Raymond Beazley, The Road to Ruin in Europe

British historians mostly agreed with Fischer's main theses, but subsequently began a nuanced and critical examination of Britain's own responsibility for the First World War. For example, James Joll wrote the following in the introduction to Germany's Aims in the First World War, Carlisle A. Macartney's translation of Fischer's Griff nach der Weltmacht:

Although Fischer's work reinforces the assumption that German leaders bore the greatest portion of responsibility for the outbreak and prolongation of World War I, it obliges British historians all the more to look again at the British government's share.

— James Joll, in Britische Historiker und der Ausbruch des Ersten Weltkriegs

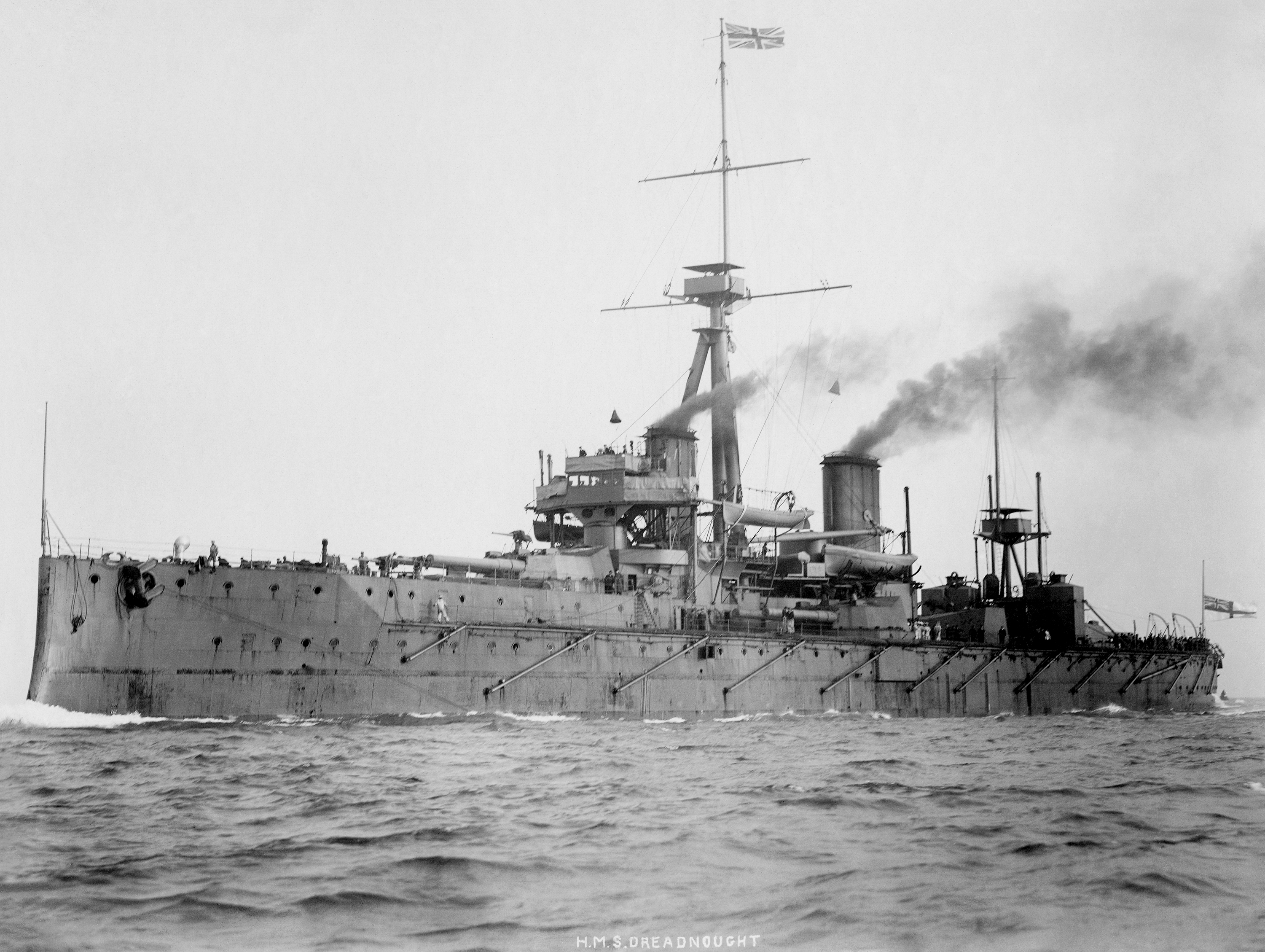
Battleship HMS Dreadnought

In 1999, historian Niall Ferguson argued in his book The Pity of War that the world war was avoidable with the crisis management available to European diplomacy at the time, and that only Britain's entry into the conflict escalated it to a pan-European war. He also argued the Anglo-German naval arms race that influenced Britain's entry into the war was exacerbated by several factors, including the Royal Navy's decision to build dreadnoughts in 1905 and British reluctance to negotiate with Germany.

As soon as Germany was no longer considered its number one military and economic competitor, British policy sought alliances with France and Russia. These diplomatic manoeuvres led to the Germans going from perceiving the British as neutral to fearing being encircled; thus strengthening Germany's readiness for war. Ferguson argued Britain's alliances with France and Russia led the German government to perceive war as inevitable after the Russian general mobilization. He denied a significant role of militarism and imperialism as a factor, as well as any significant conflict over colonial interests between Germany and Great Britain.

However, these theses were mostly rejected despite praise for their economic analyses. Thomas Kühne called Ferguson a historical revisionist.

Military historian John Keegan also saw World War I in 1999 as caused not by deliberate action on the part of the powers but by the fatal automatism of the alliances:

The First World War was a tragic and unnecessary conflict. Unnecessary because the train of events that led to its outbreak might have been broken at any point during the five weeks of crisis that preceded the first clash of arms. (Note: Opening lines of John Keegan's First World War: "The First World War was a tragic and unnecessary conflict. Unnecessary because the train of events that led to its outbreak might have been broken at any point during the five weeks of crisis that preceded the first clash of arms had prudence or common goodwill found a voice; tragic because the consequences of the first clash ended the lives of ten million human beings, tortured the emotional lives of millions more, destroyed the benevolent and optimistic culture of the European continent and left, when the guns at last fell silent four years later, a legacy of political rancor and racial hatred so intense that no explanation of the causes of the Second World War can stand without reference to those roots.")

— John Keegan, The First World War, Chapter One: A European Tragedy

Like Keith M. Wilson and Michael Brock, Keegan doubted Germany's primary culpability in the outbreak of war. These historians point to a willingness of the British public to intervene, and the rather confrontational policies of the Foreign Office.

According to John Leslie, the real authors of the war were not to be sought solely in Berlin, as the Fritz Fischer school had always maintained, but also in Vienna. (Note: "Leslie quotation "The real authors of the war..." is a back-translation from German in Melville (1988): "die eigentlichen Urheber des Kriegs nicht nur in Berlin, wie die Fritz-Fischer-Schule immer behauptet hat, sondern auch in Wien zu suchen") In his view, a group of "hawks" in the Austrian Foreign Ministry had unleashed the war. The Scottish military historian Hew Strachan emphasizes the economic competition between Germany and England, Germany's isolation in foreign policy, and what he sees as a disastrous effect of the policy of alliances:

Numerical inferiority and geographic location meant that in the event of war, Germany could not simply remain on the defensive: It had to act decisively and attack. ... Maintaining and breaking alliances became an end in itself, more important than keeping the peace. Consequently, no state bore particular guilt in 1914. (Note: "Numerical inferiority and geographic location..." is a back-translation from German in Burgdorf & Wiegrefe (2004): "Zahlenmäßige Unterlegenheit und geografische Lage bedeuteten, dass im Kriegsfall Deutschland nicht einfach in der Defensive bleiben konnte: Es musste entschlossen handeln und angreifen. […] Der Erhalt und das Zerbrechen von Allianzen wurden zum Selbstzweck, wichtiger als die Wahrung des Friedens. Folglich trug 1914 kein Staat besondere Schuld.")

— Hew Strachan, Wer war schuld? – Wie es zum Ersten Weltkrieg kam. [Who was to blame? - How the First World War came about.]

According to Paul W. Schroeder, the German fears of encirclement in 1914 were based on reality and resulted from a lack of willingness on the part of Germany and Austria-Hungary to carry out social and political reforms:

Consensus historians recognize further that Germany, already in 1914 largely isolated diplomatically and threatened with encirclement by the Triple Entente, faced an imminent future threat, that once Russia had completed its announced plans for military expansion, scheduled for completion by 1917, the German army would be numerically as decisively inferior to those of its opponents as the German navy already was on the sea. […] Thus in both cases the supposedly counterproductive and dangerous foreign policies of Germany and Austria-Hungary culminating in their gamble in 1914 are linked to a wider problem and at least partly explained by it: the failure or refusal of their regimes to reform and modernize in order to meet their internal political and social problems.

— Paul W Schroeder, Embedded counterfactuals and World War I as an unavoidable war

Australian historian Christopher Clark also disagreed in his 2012 study The Sleepwalkers.

All [major European powers] thought they were acting under outside pressure. All of them thought that the war was being forced on them by their opponents. However, all of them made decisions that contributed to the escalation of the crisis. To that extent, they all bear responsibility, not just Germany.

— Interview with Christopher Clark: Der Griff nach der Weltmacht, in: Die Zeit, 12 September 2013, p. 22

=== Soviet Union ===
Following Lenin's theory of imperialism, the Soviet Union's state-imposed view of history assigned the blame for the war to all "capitalist states" and allowed scarcely any independent research into the causes of the war. Beginning in about 1925, attempts were made to exonerate the tsarist system from the central blame that imperial German and Weimar era nationalist historians had assigned to it. To facilitate the view, the Soviet Union published files from the tsarist archives.

Soviet historian Igor Bestushev disputed the attempt at national exoneration and stated in opposition to Fritz Fischer:

The examination of the facts shows, on the contrary, that the policy of all the Great Powers, including Russia, objectively led to the World War. The responsibility for the war is borne by the ruling circles of all the Great Powers without exception, notwithstanding the fact that the governments of Germany and Austria, which initiated the war, displayed greater activity because Germany was better prepared for war and Austria's internal crisis was steadily worsening, and notwithstanding the additional fact that the decision on the timing of the war was for all practical purposes ultimately taken by Germany and England.

Marxism's models for explaining guilt for the war assign a major part of the blame for its outbreak to economic factors and big banks. In 1976 Reinhold Zilch criticized the "clearly aggressive aims of Reichsbank President Rudolf Havenstein on the eve of war", while in 1991 Willibald Gutsche argued that in 1914, "in addition to the coal and steel monopolists, [...] influential representatives of the big banks and electrical and shipping monopolies were also not inclined towards peace".

This view is disputed by individual studies on the concrete behavior of the business community before the war. Nevertheless, economic interests and structures are also recognized as a factor in the war by historians researching traditional diplomatic history (e.g. Imanuel Geiss).

=== United States ===
Academic work in the English-speaking world in the later 1920s and 1930s, blamed the participants more or less equally. In the early 1920s, several American historians opposed to the terms of the Treaty of Versailles such as Sidney Bradshaw Fay, Charles A. Beard and Harry Elmer Barnes produced works that claimed that Germany was not responsible for war. Article 231 of the Treaty of Versailles, which had seemingly assigned all responsibility for the war to Germany and thus justified the Allied claim to reparations, was invalid. A feature of American "revisionist" historians of the 1920s was a tendency to treat Germany as a victim of the war and the Allies as the aggressors. The objective of Fay and Barnes was to put an end to reparations imposed on Germany, by attempting to prove what they regarded as the moral invalidity of Article 231. The exiled Wilhelm praised Barnes upon meeting him in 1926. According to Barnes, Wilhelm "was happy to know that I did not blame him for starting the war in 1914. He disagreed with my view that Russia and France were chiefly responsible. He held that the villains of 1914 were the international Jews and Free Masons who, he alleged, desired to destroy national states and the Christian religion."

The German Foreign Ministry lavished special "care" upon the efforts of both Fay and Barnes with generous use of the German archives, and in the case of Barnes, research funds provided by the German government. The German government liked Fay's The Origin of the War so much that it purchased hundreds of copies in various languages to hand out for free at German embassies and consulates. The German government allowed books that were pro-German in their interpretation, such as Barnes's The Genesis of the World War, to be translated into German while books such as Bernadotte Schmitt's The Coming of War 1914 that were critical of German actions in 1914, were not permitted to be published in Germany.

=== Austria ===
For Emperor Franz Joseph I, the responsibilities for military action against Serbia were clear at the end of July 1914: "The machinations of a hateful adversary compel Me, in order to preserve the honor of My Monarchy and to protect its position of power ... to take up the sword." However, the Serbian government had sent Vienna a warning in the run-up to the Sarajevo attack, which was not taken seriously.

"We started the war, not the Germans and even less the Entente," was the assessment of Leopold Andrian, a former diplomat of the Danube Monarchy, shortly after the war. It had been "about the existence of the fatherland".

Chancellor Karl Renner, who headed the Austrian negotiating delegation to St. Germain in 1919, took a similar view: The delegation made a confession of war guilt.

German historian and expert on the July Crisis Annika Mombauer agrees with this, but also sees Germany as responsible: "...the main part of the responsibility for the outbreak of the war must still be situated in the decisions of Austria-Hungary and Germany".

== Post-World War II ==
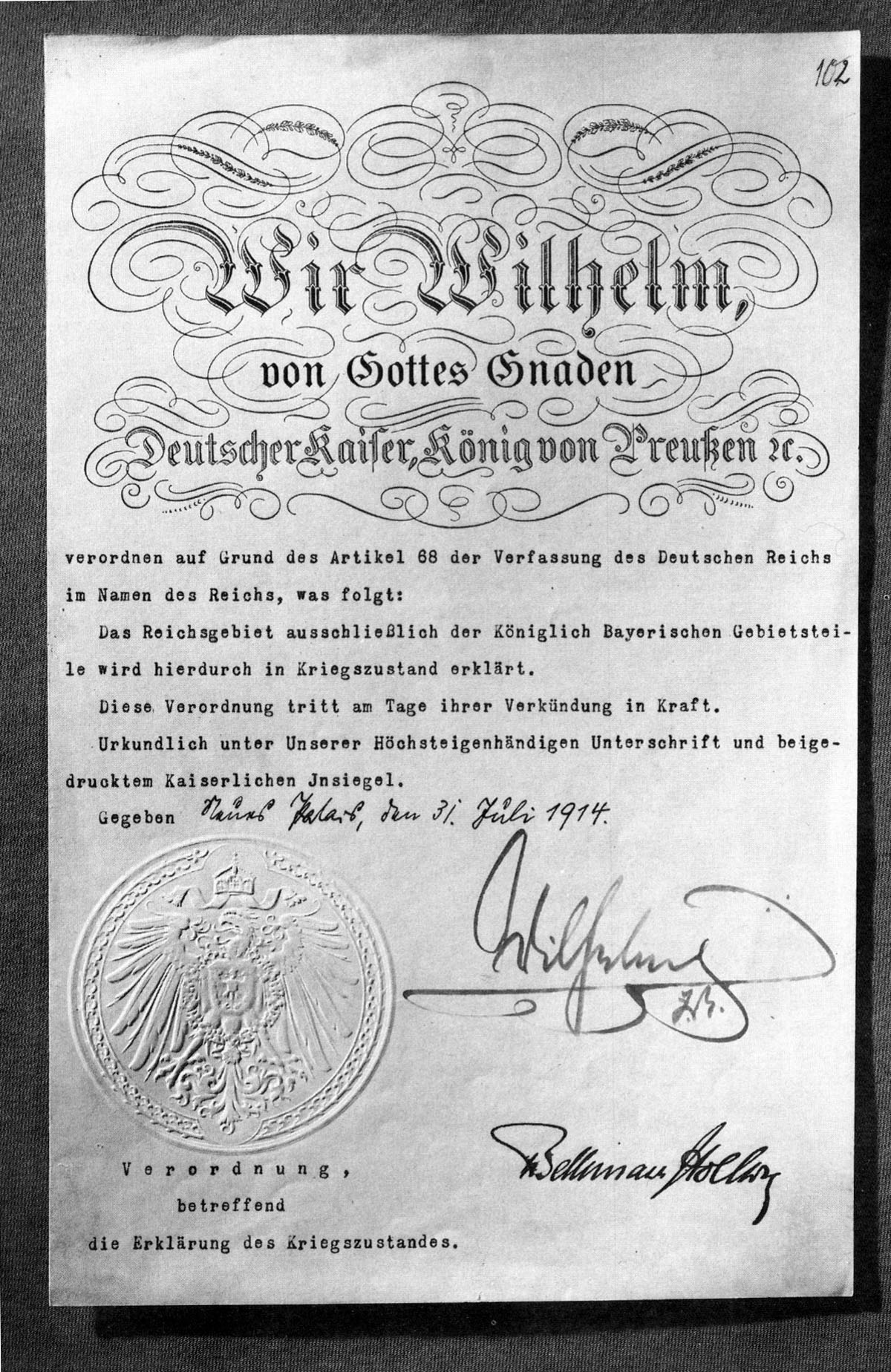
German declaration of war signed by Emperor William II

=== West Germany ===
After the fall of the Nazi regime, conservative historians from the time of the Weimar Republic dominated the debates in West Germany by spreading the same theses as before. For example, Gerhard Ritter wrote that "A politico-military situation held our diplomacy prisoner at the time of the great world crisis of July 1914."

In Die deutsche Katastrophe, Friedrich Meinecke supports the same idea. Foreign research, such as that of the Italian Luigi Albertini, is not taken into account. In his three-volume critical work, published in 1942-1943 (Le origini della guerra del 1914), Albertini comes to the conclusion that all European governments had a share of responsibility in the outbreak of the war, while pointing to German pressure on Austria-Hungary as the decisive factor in the latter's bellicose behaviour in Serbia.

In September 1949, Ritter, who became the first president of the Union of German Historians stated in his opening statement that the fight against the war guilt question at the time of the Weimar Republic finally led to the worldwide success of German theses, which he still maintained in his 1950 essay: "The German thesis that there could be no question of a long-prepared invasion of their neighbours by the Central Powers soon became generalized within the huge international specialist research community."

=== Fischer controversy ===
The Hamburg historian Fritz Fischer was the first to research all accessible archive holdings according to the war aims of the Central Powers before and during the war. In October 1959 his essay about German war objectives was published. Hans Herzfeld's response in Historischen Zeitschrift (Historical Journal) marked the beginning of a controversy that lasted until about 1985 and permanently changed the national conservative consensus on the question of war guilt.

Fischer's book Germany's Aims in the First World War drew conclusions from detailed analysis of the long-term causes of war and their connection the foreign and German colonial policy of Kaiser Wilhelm II.

Given that Germany wanted, desired and covered up the Austrian-Serbian war and, trusting in German military superiority, deliberately chose to enter into conflict with Russia and France in 1914, the German Imperial leadership bears a considerable part of the historical responsibility for the outbreak of a general war.

Initially, right-wing conservative authors such as Giselher Wirsing accused Fischer of pseudo-history and, like Erwin Hölzle, tried to uphold the Supreme Army Command's hypothesis of Russian war guilt. Imanuel Geiss supported Fischer in 1963–64 with a two-volume collection of documents, referring in it to the destruction of important files from the July crisis in Berlin shortly after the war.

After a battle of speeches lasting several hours at the 1964 Historians' Day, Fischer's main rival Andreas Hillgruber conceded considerable responsibility of the German leadership under Chancellor Bethmann Hollweg for the outbreak of the war, but continued to deny the Empire's continuous striving for hegemony before and during the war. Gerhard Ritter stuck to his view of a foreign policy "encirclement" (Einkreisung) of Germany by the Entente powers, which in his view, had rendered any German striving for hegemony as purely illusory adventurism.

German-American historian Klaus Epstein noted, when Fischer published his findings in 1961, that Fischer instantly rendered obsolete every book previously published on the subject of responsibility for the First World War, and German aims in that war. Fischer's own position on German responsibility for World War I has become known as the "Fischer thesis."

Since around 1970, Fischer's work has stimulated increased research into the socio-economic causes of war. These include the orientation toward a war economy, the imperial monarchy's inability to reform domestic policy, and domestic competition over resources.

== Contemporary research ==
Since German reunification in 1990, archives from the former GDR and the Soviet Union have also been evaluated. Prompted by Fischer's theses, researchers increasingly devoted themselves to German policy in the states occupied by the Kaiserreich. Wolfgang J. Mommsen presented concrete plans for the forced expulsion and resettlement of Poles and Jews and, in 1981, blamed government action on the nationalism of important interest groups. Wolfgang Steglich, on the other hand, used foreign archival material to emphasize German-Austrian efforts to achieve an amicable or separate peace since 1915, and lack of crisis management by Germany's opponents.

Thomas Nipperdey contradicted sociohistorical explanations in 1991 with his view that the "war, the German readiness for war and the crisis policy" were not a consequence of the German social system. He modified Lloyd George's "slide into war" thesis and referred to disastrous military plans and war decisions of the executive even in parliamentary states.

According to Jürgen Kocka (2003) and Gerhard Hirschfeld (2004), since the Fischer controversy died down, Germany's decisive role in the outbreak of the war in 1914 has been widely acknowledged. However, they argue that this role is now explained in a more nuanced way than by Fischer, taking into account not only Germany's actions but also the broader European power dynamics and crises before 1914. Gerd Krumeich wrote in 2003 that Germany had largely sabotaged efforts at diplomatic deescalation and therefore bore a large share of the blame.

2013 saw the publication of Christopher Clark's The Sleepwalkers: How Europe Went to War in 1914, and Herfried Münkler, The Great War. The World 1914 to 1918, two works that disputed whether Germany contributed any more to the outbreak of the Great War in 1914 through its actions or inactions than the other great powers did. Since their appearance, the debate has once again been considered open, according to some scholars.

More recent publications by and large stick to the earlier view, namely that Germany contributed significantly to the fact "that as the crisis widened, alternative strategies for de-escalation did not bear fruit ... Given Germany's policy until 23 July to exert pressure on the Viennese government to take advantage of the situation and to deal with the Serbs, Germany undoubtedly did have a special responsibility". In contrast to Christopher Clark's view, Gerd Krumeich, John C. G. Röhl, and Annika Mombauer summed up the situation as the Central Powers bearing primary responsibility for the outbreak of the war, even if it could not be blamed on them alone.

The public debate on longer-term causes of the war continues. Today, it relates primarily to the following topics:

- the question of political room for maneuver, or the inevitability of rearmament and the policy of alliances before the war. With this question, the earlier classification of the era as imperialist became more varied and nuanced. In most cases, the common culpability of all European hegemonic powers is highlighted, without diminishing the triggering moves by Germany and Austria.
- the role of domestic politics, social tensions, and economic interests in the escalation of foreign policy among all participating states
- the role of mob mentality and war experiences and their interaction with war propaganda. This is addressed in the Bruno Thoss essay.
- the role of military leaders and military interests that scuttled efforts to de-escalate and to negotiate a peace.
- the question of a possible German Sonderweg into the 20th century
- the question of influential factors that possibly made the First World War the necessary conditions and preparatory groundwork for the Second World War and its crimes and significantly contributed to the outbreak and course of the Second World War: Thus, many speak of the "Great seminal catastrophe of the 20th century"; (Note: George Kennan: who called World War I "the great seminal catastrophe of this century") Raymond Aron sees both world wars as a new "Thirty Years' War".

Anne Lipp's Meinungslenkung im Krieg (Shaping Opinion in War) analyzed how soldiers, military leaders, and wartime propaganda reacted to the front-line experience of mass destruction. Attempts had been made to refute doubts about the defensive character of the war by placing it in an aggressive-nationalist context. "Fatherland Instruction" (Note: During the First World War, the term Fatherland Instruction (Fatherland Instruction) was used to describe the propagandistic influence exerted both on German soldiers as well as on the home front to promote the views and goals of the Supreme Army Command (Oberste Heeresleitung). The primary aim was to strengthen the will to persevere in the face of the increasingly difficult military and economic situation from 1916 on.) offered front-line soldiers heroic images for identification, in order to redirect their horror, and their fears of death and defeat into the opposite of what they had experienced. To the "homeland," the "front-line fighters" were held up as role models to prevent insubordination, desertion, public agitation against a war of conquest, and maintaining solidarity of soldiers and civilians against it. This had created a persistent, mass mentality that set the course for the postwar success of war-glorifying myths such as the stab-in-the-back myth.

In 2002, the historians Friedrich Kiessling and Holger Afflerbach emphasized the opportunities for détente between the major European powers that had existed until the assassination in Sarajevo which had not been exploited. Other historians disagreed: in 2003, Volker Berghahn argued that the structural causes of the war, which went beyond individual government decisions, could be found in the alliance system of the European great powers and their gradual formation of blocs. Like Fischer and others, he too saw the naval arms race and competition in the conquest of colonies as major factors by which all of Europe's great powers contributed to the outbreak of war, albeit with differences in degree. He also considered domestic minority conflicts in multinational Austria. Nevertheless, he named the small leadership circles, especially in Berlin and Vienna, as the main culprits for the fact that the July crisis of 1914 led to war. The decision makers had shown a high willingness to take risks and at the same time had aggravated the crisis with mismanagement and miscalculations, until the only solution seemed to them to be the "flight forward" (Note: Flight forward: "Flucht nach vorn") into war with the other great powers.

== See also ==
- Article 231 of the Treaty of Versailles
- Austria victim theory
- Causes of World War I
  - American entry into World War I
  - Austro-Hungarian entry into World War I
  - British entry into World War I
  - French entry into World War I
  - German entry into World War I
  - Italian entry into World War I
  - Japanese entry into World War I
  - Ottoman entry into World War I
  - Russian entry into World War I
  - History of the Balkans
  - Paris Peace Conference, 1919
- Centre for the Study of the Causes of the War
- Commission of Responsibilities
- European Civil War
- German collective guilt
- German question
- Germany's Aims in the First World War
- Historiography of Germany
  - Harry Elmer Barnes
  - Hermann Lutz
  - Max Montgelas
  - Pierre Renouvin
- Historiography of the causes of World War I
- International relations (1814–1919)
- International relations (1919–1939)
- Manifesto of the Ninety-Three
- Paris Peace Conference (1919–1920)
- Propaganda in World War I
- "War of Illusions"
- World War I reparations

== Works cited ==
- Ackermann, Volker (13 May 2004). "Sammelrez: Literaturbericht: 'Erster Weltkrieg' - H-Soz-u-Kult / Rezensionen / Bücher" [Omnibus review: Literature report: 'First World War' - H-Soz-u-Cult / Reviews / Books] (PDF). H-Soz-u-Kult (in German). Berlin: Clio-online. Archived from the original (PDF) on 16 August 2005.
- Ackermann, Volker (13 May 2004a). Markus Pöhlmann: Kriegsgeschichte und Geschichtspolitik: Der Erste Weltkrieg. Die amtliche Militärgeschichtsschreibung 1914–1956 (Rezension) [Markus Pöhlmann: History of War and Historical Politics: The First World War. Official Military Historiography 1914–1956 (review)] (in German). Hamburger Ed. ISBN 9783930908769.
- Altmann, Gerhard; Scriba, Arnulf (14 September 2014). "LeMO Kapitel - Weimarer Republik - Innenpolitik - Kriegsschuldreferat" [Weimar Republic Domestic policy - War Guilt Section]. Deutsches Historisches Museum (in German).
- Bade, Wilfrid (1933). Geschichte des dritten reiches (in German). Vol. 1. 1933, das Jahr der Revolution. Lübeck: C. Coleman. OCLC 719076014.
- Beazley, Charles Raymond (Sir) (1932). The Road to ruin in Europe, 1890-1914. Dent. p. 86. "...she [Germany] had not plotted the Great War, had not desired a war, and had made genuine, though belated and ill-organized efforts to avert it."
- Beer, Max (1915). "Das Regenbogen-Buch": deutsches Wiessbuch, österreichisch-ungarisches Rotbuch, englisches Blaubuch, französisches Gelbbuch, russisches Orangebuch, serbisches Blaubuch und belgisches Graubuch, die europäischen Kriegsverhandlungen [The Rainbow Book: German White Book, Austrian-Hungarian Red Book, English Blue Book, French Yellow Book, Russian Orange Book, Serbian Blue Book and Belgian Grey Book, the European war negotiations] (2nd, improved ed.). Bern: F. Wyss. pp. 16–. OCLC 9427935.
- Bestuschew, Igor W. (1967). "Die russische Außenpolitik von Februar bis Juni 1914" [Russian Foreign Policy from February to June 1914]. Journal of Contemporary History (in German). 3. Munich: Nymphenburger Verlagshandlung: 150 f.
- Binkley, Robert C.; Mahr, Dr. A. C. (June 1926). "A New Interpretation of the "Responsibility" Clause in the Versailles Treaty". Current History. 24 (3): 398–400. doi:10.1525/curh.1926.24.3.398. S2CID 249693067.
- Clark, Christopher (19 March 2013). The Sleepwalkers: How Europe Went to War in 1914. Harper. ISBN 978-0-06-219922-5.
- Cline, Catherine Ann (1988). "British Historians and the Treaty of Versailles". Albion: A Quarterly Journal Concerned with British Studies. 20 (1): 43–58. doi:10.2307/4049797. JSTOR 4049797.
- Cornelißen, Christoph (22 June 2014). "'Oh! What a Lovely War!' Zum Forschungsertrag und zu den Tendenzen ausgewählter Neuerscheinungen über den Ersten Weltkrieg" ["Oh! What a Lovely War!". On the Research Output and Trends of Selected New Publications on the First World War]. Geschichte in Wissenschaft und Unterricht (in German). 65 (5–06): 272–279. ISSN 0016-9056. OCLC 230703976.
- Draeger, Hans (1934). Anklage und Widerlegung. Taschenbuch zur Kriegsschuldfrage [Charge and rebuttal. Pocket edition on the question of war guilt.] (in German). Berlin: Arbeitsausschuss Deutscher Verbände. OCLC 934736076.
- Fabian, Walter (1985) [1926]. Die Kriegsschuldfrage. Grunsätzliches und Tatsächliches zu ihrer Lösung [The War Guilt Question. Basic and Factual Information on its Solution]. Kultur- und Zeitfragen, 19 (in German) (1st ed.). Bremen: Ernst Oldenburg. ISBN 3-924444-08-0. OCLC 1075866888.
- Ferguson, Niall (1999) [1998:Penguin (The Pity of War: Explaining World War I)]. Der falsche Krieg: der Erste Weltkrieg und das 20. Jahrhundert (in German). Translated by Kochmann, Klaus. Stuttgart: Dt. Verlag-Anst. ISBN 978-3-421-05175-2. translated from:
  - Ferguson, Niall (1999) [1998:Penguin]. The Pity of War: Explaining World War I. Basic Books. ISBN 978-0-465-05712-2. OCLC 443322632.
- Ferro, Marc (6 October 2003) [1st English ed. Routledge:1973, from Gallimard:1969], The Great War: 1914–1918, London: Routledge, ISBN 978-1-134-49920-5, OCLC 59290460
- Fischer, Fritz (1959). Deutsche Kriegsziele Revolutionierung und Separatfrieden im Osten, 1914-1918 [German War Aims – Revolutionization and Separate Peace in the East, 1914-1918] (in German). Munich: R. Oldenbourg Verlag. OCLC 21427726.
- Fischer, Fritz (1971) [1st pub: 1961]. Griff nach der Weltmacht : die Kriegszielpolitik des kaiserlichen Deutschland 1914/18 [Reaching for World Power : The War Aims Policy of Imperial Germany 1914/18] (in German) (3rd ed.). Dusseldorf: Droste. OCLC 1154200466..
- France. Ministère des affaires étrangères; Commission de publication des documents relatifs aux origines de la guerre de 1914 (1936). Documents diplomatiques français (1871-1914) [French diplomatic documents]. Vol. Tome X, (17 mars-23 juillet 1914) (3e Série, (1911-1914) ed.). Imprimerie Nationale. OCLC 769058353.
- France. Ministère des affaires étrangères; Commission de publication des documents relatifs aux origines de la guerre de 1914 (1936). Documents diplomatiques français (1871-1914) [French diplomatic documents]. Vol. Tome XI, (24 juillet-4 août 1914) (3e Série, (1911-1914) ed.). Imprimerie Nationale. OCLC 769062659.
- Frie, Ewald (2004). Das Deutsche Kaiserreich. Kontroversen um die Geschichte (in German). Darmstadt: Wissenschaftliche Buchgesellschaft. ISBN 978-3-534-14725-0. OCLC 469341132.
- Gasser, Adolf (1985). Preussischer Militärgeist und Kriegsentfesselung 1914: drei Studien zum Ausbruch des Ersten Weltkrieges [Prussian Military Spirit and Unleashing War in 1914: Three Studies on the Outbreak of the First World War] (in German). Frankfurt: Helbing & Lichtenhahn. ISBN 978-3-7190-0903-8. OCLC 610859897.
- Geiss, Imanuel (1963). Julikrise und Kriegsausbruch 1914: Dokumentensammlung [The July Crisis and Outbreak of the 1914 War: Document Collection] (in German). Hanover: Verlag für Literatur und Zeitgeschehen. OCLC 468874551.
- Geiss, Imanuel (1978a). "Die Kriegsschuldfrage - das Ende eines nationalen Tabus" [The War Guilt Question - the End of a National Taboo]. Das Deutsche Reich und die Vorgeschichte des Ersten Weltkriegs [The German Reich and the Background of the First World War]. Reihe Hanser (in German). Vol. 248. Vienna: Hanser. ISBN 978-3-446-12494-3. OCLC 1087913264.
- Geiss, Imanuel (1978b). "16 Karl Liebknecht". Das Deutsche Reich und der Erste Weltkrieg. Reihe Hanser. Vol. 249. Munich; Vienna: Hanser. ISBN 978-3-446-12495-0. OCLC 604904798.
- Geiss, Imanuel (1978c). "Sozialstruktur und imperialistische Dispositionen im Zweiten Deutschen Kaiserreich" [Social Structure and Imperialist Dispositions in the Second German Empire]. Das Deutsche Reich und die Vorgeschichte des Ersten Weltkriegs [The German Reich and the Background to the First World War] (in German). Munich: Carl Hanser Verlag. pp. 28–52. ISBN 978-3446124943.
- "Wilhelmine Germany and the First World War (1890-1918) | Adolf Hitler, Mein Kampf (1925)". GHDI (German History in Documents and Images). 17 December 2003.
- Gooch, G.P.; Temperley, Harold (1926). British Documents on the Origins of the War, 1898-1914. Vol. XI. London: HMSO.
- Gougeon, Jacques-Pierre (1996). La social-démocratie allemande, 1830-1996: de la révolution au réformisme [The German Social Democracy, 1830-1996; from Revolution to Reform]. Histoires. Paris: Aubier. ISBN 978-2-7007-2270-3. OCLC 410241884.
- Gutsche, Willibald (1991). "Die Außenpolitik des Kaiserreichs in der Geschichtsschreibung der DDR" [The Foreign Policy of the German Empire in the Historiography of the GDR]. In Schöllgen, Gregor (ed.). Flucht in den Krieg? Die Außenpolitik des kaiserlichen Deutschland [Escape into War? The Foreign Policy of Imperial Germany] (in German). WBG Wissenschaftliche Buchgesellschaft. p. 84. ISBN 3-534-80130-X.
- Hayne, M. B. (1993), The French Foreign Office and the Origins of the First World War, 1898-1914 (thesis), Oxford: Clarendon Press, ISBN 978-0-19-820270-7, OCLC 917682856
- Heinemann, Ulrich [in German] (1983). Die verdrängte Niederlage. Politische Öffentlichkeit und Kriegsschuldfrage in der Weimarer Republik [The Repressed Defeat. The Public Sphere in Politics and the War Guilt Question in the Weimar Republic]. Critische Studien zur Geschichtswissenschaft, 59 [Critical Studies in Historiography] (in German). Göttingen: Vandenhoeck & Ruprecht. ISBN 978-3-647-35718-8. OCLC 466417220.
- Herwig, Holger (1997). "Patriotic Self-Censorship in Germany". In Herwig, Holger (ed.). The Outbreak of World War I. Problems in European civilization. Boston: Houghton Mifflin. ISBN 978-0-669-41692-3. OCLC 964583809.
- Hillgruber, Andreas; Hillgruber, Karin (1979). Deutschlands Rolle in der Vorgeschichte der beiden Weltkriege. Kleine Vandenhoeck-Reihe. Vol. 1458. Göttingen: Vandenhoeck & Ruprecht. ISBN 978-3-525-33440-9. OCLC 243427381.
- Hirschfeld, Gerhard; Krumeich, Gerd; Renz, Irina (2003). Enzyklopädie Erster Weltkrieg (in German). Paderborn: Schöningh. Kriegsschuldfrage. ISBN 978-3-8385-8551-2. OCLC 895742911.
- Hirschfeld, Gerhard (8 July 2004). "Der Erste Weltkrieg in der deutschen und internationalen Geschichtsschreibung". Bundeszentrale für politischen Bildung [Federal Agency for Civic Education] (in German).
- Hitler, Adolf (20 April 1925). "V". Mein Kampf. Vol. 1 Eine Abrechnung. Metal-Inex Incorporated. ISBN 978-1-68204-213-7.
- Horne, John; Kramer, Alan (2001). German Atrocities, 1914: A History of Denial. Yale University Press. ISBN 978-0-300-10791-3.
- Isaac, Jules (1933). Un débat historique: le problème des origines de la guerre [A Historic Debate: the Problem of the Origins of the War]. Paris: Rieder. OCLC 487772456.
- Jackisch, Barry A. (24 February 2016). The Pan-German League and Radical Nationalist Politics in Interwar Germany, 1918-39. Routledge. ISBN 978-1-317-02185-8.
- Brandenburgische Landeszentrale für politische Bildung (1995). "Jüdische Kultur und Geschichte 6. Der Holocaust" [Jewish Culture and History 6. The Holocaust] (PDF). Wayback machine / Politische Bildung Brandenburg (in German). p. 117. Archived from the original (PDF) on 15 December 2007.
- Keegan, John (1998). The First World War. Hutchinson. ISBN 978-0-09-180178-6. OCLC 1167992766.
- Keegan, John (21 November 2012). The First World War. Knopf Doubleday. ISBN 978-0-307-83170-5.
- Kempe, Hans (2008). Der Vertrag von Versailles und seine Folgen: Propagandakrieg gegen Deutschland [The Treaty of Versailles and its Consequences: Propaganda War against Germany]. Vaterländischen Schriften (in German). Vol. 7 Kriegschuldlüge 1919 [War Guilt Lies 1919]. Mannheim: Reinhard Welz Vermittler Verlag e.K. pp. 238–257 (vol. 7 p.19). ISBN 978-3-938622-16-2.
- Kocka, Juergen (2004). "Entfernung und Einsicht. Weltkriegsforschung im Wandel" [Distance and Insight. World War II Research in Transition] (PDF). Arbeitskreis Militaergeschichte Newsletter (in German). 8 (1). Archived from the original (PDF) on 31 January 2012.
- König, Diemut; Odierna, Simone (2021). Dynamiken des Erinnerns in der internationalen Jugendarbeit: Geschichte, Gedenken und Pädagogik zum Ersten Weltkrieg [Dynamics of Memory in International Youth Work: History, Commemoration and Pedagogy of the First World War]. Waxmann Verlag. ISBN 978-3-8309-9321-6. OCLC 1237966687.
- Kracht, Klaus Große (May 2004). "Kriegsschuldfrage und zeithistorische Forschung in Deutschland. Historiographische Nachwirkungen des Ersten Weltkriegs" [The Question of War Guilt and Contemporary Historical Research in Germany. Historiographical Aftermath of the First World War]. Zeitgeschichte-online (in German).
- Krüger, Peter [in German] (1985). Die Aussenpolitik der Republik von Weimar [Foreign Policy of the Weimar Republic] (in German). Darmstadt: Wissenschaftliche Buchgesellschaft. ISBN 978-3-534-07250-7. OCLC 1071412383.
- Krumeich, Gerd (1994). "Vergleichende Aspekte der 'Kriegsschulddebatte' nach dem ersten Weltkrieg" [Comparative aspects of the 'war guilt debate' after the First World War]. In Michalka, Wolfgang (ed.). Der Erste Weltkrieg: Wirkung, Wahrnehmung, Analyse [The First World War : impact, awareness, analysis]. Piper Series (in German). Munich: Piper. pp. 913–928. ISBN 978-3-492-11927-6. OCLC 906656746.
- Krumeich, Gerd (15 December 2013). Juli 1914: Eine Bilanz. Mit einem Anhang: 50 Schlüsseldokumente zum Kriegsausbruch (in German). Verlag Ferdinand Schöningh. ISBN 978-3-657-77592-7. OCLC 965634261.
- Kühne, Thomas (6 February 2007). Rezension zu: N. Ferguson: The War of the World | H-Soz-Kult. Kommunikation und Fachinformation für die Geschichtswissenschaften | Geschichte im Netz [Review of: N. Ferguson: The War of the World | H-Soz-Kult. Communication and Specialized Information for the Historical Sciences | History on the Web]. Allen Lane. ISBN 9780713997088.
- Leonhard, Jörn (2014). Die Büchse der Pandora: Geschichte des Ersten Weltkriegs (in German). Munich: Beck. ISBN 978-3-406-66191-4. OCLC 869873811.
- Leslie, John (1988). "Österreich-Ungarn vor dem Kriegsausbruch" [Austria-Hungary before the Outbreak of War]. In Ralph Melville (ed.). Deutschland und Europa in der Neuzeit. Veröffentlichungen des Instituts für Europäische Geschichte Mainz, 134,2. Vol. 2. Stuttgart: F. Steiner Verlag. ISBN 978-3-515-05053-1. OCLC 611958769.
- Lipp, Anne (2003). Meinungslenkung im Krieg: Kriegserfahrungen deutscher Soldaten und ihre Deutung 1914-1918 [Shaping Opinions in War: War Experiences of German Soldiers and Their Interpretation 1914-1918] (in German). Vandenhoeck & Ruprecht. ISBN 978-3-525-35140-6.
- Lipstadt, Deborah E. (1994). Denying the Holocaust: The Growing Assault on Truth and Memory. Plume. ISBN 978-0-7857-7001-5. OCLC 1097593638.
- Longerich, Peter (1992). Die Erste Republik. Dokumente zur Geschichte des Weimarer Staates [The First Republic. Documents on the history of the Weimar State] (in German). Munich: Piper.
- Löwe, Teresa (2000). "II. Bernsteins Kampf für die Anerkennung der deutschen Kriegsschuld". Der Politiker Eduard Bernstein: eine Untersuchung zu seinem politischen Wirken in der Frühphase der Weimarer Republik (1918-1924). Gesprächskreis Geschichte (in German). Vol. 40. Bonn: Friedrich-Ebert-Stiftung, Historisches Forschungszentrum. ISBN 978-3-86077-958-3. OCLC 802083353.
- Ludendorff, Erich (1919). Ludendorff's Own Story, August 1914-November 1918: The Great War from the Siege of Liège to the Signing of the Armistice as Viewed from the Grand Headquarters of the German Army. Harper. ISBN 978-0-8369-5956-7. OCLC 127386982.
- Mombauer, Annika (2 December 2013). "The German 'innocence campaign'". The Origins of the First World War: Controversies and Consensus. Abingdon, England: Routledge. ISBN 978-1-317-87584-0. OCLC 864746118.
- Mombauer, Annika (25 February 2014). Die Julikrise: Europas Weg in den Ersten Weltkrieg (in German). Munich: C.H.Beck. ISBN 978-3-406-66109-9.
- Mommsen, Wolfgang J. (1969). Das Zeitalter des Imperialismus: Hrsg. und verfasst von Wolfgang J. Mommsen. Fischer Weltgeschichte, 28 (in German). Fischer Bücherei. ISBN 9783436012168.
- Mommsen, Wolfgang J. (1990). Der autoritäre Nationalstaat: Verfassung, Gesellschaft und Kultur des deutschen Kaiserreiches (in German). Fischer Taschenbuch. ISBN 978-3-596-10525-0.
- Mommsen, Wolfgang J. (2004). Der Erste Weltkrieg: Anfang vom Ende des bürgerlichen Zeitalters (in German). Fischer Taschenbuch Verlag. ISBN 978-3-596-15773-0.
- Morrow, John H. (2005). The Great War: An Imperial History. Routledge. ISBN 978-0-415-20440-8. OCLC 442366474.
- "First World War | German White Book". United Kingdom: The National Archives.
- Nipperdey, Thomas (1990). Deutsche Geschichte 1866-1918: Bd. Machtstaat vor der Demokratie (in German). Munich: C.H.Beck. ISBN 978-3-406-34801-3.
- Pawly, Ronald (2012). The Kaiser's Warlords: German Commanders of World War I. Bloomsbury. ISBN 978-1-78096-630-4.
- Poidevin, Raymond [in French] (1972). L'Allemagne de Guillaume II à Hindenburg, 1900-1933 [Germany of William II at Hindenburg, 1900-1933]. L'Univers Contemporain, 4 (in French). Éditions Richelieu. OCLC 857948335.
- Poincaré, Raymond (1939). Comment fut déclarée la Guerre de 1914 [How the War of 1914 Broke Out]. Toute l'histoire, 8 (in French). Paris: Flammarion. OCLC 459549338.
- Ritter, Gerhard (1950). "Gegenwärtige Lage und Zukunftsaufgaben deutscher Geschichtswissenschaft" [Present Situation and Future Tasks of German Historiography]. Historische Zeitschrift (in German). 170: 1–22. doi:10.1524/hzhz.1950.170.jg.1. S2CID 164587071.
- Ritter, Gerhard (1960). Die Hauptmächte Europas und das wilhelminische Reich (1890-1914) [The Principal Powers of Europe and the Wilhelmine Empire (1890-1914)]. Staatskunst und Kriegshandwerk, 2 [Statesmanship and Art of War Vol. 2] (in German). Vol. 2. Munich: R. Oldenbourg. OCLC 252324928. "Military-political predicament that virtually shackled our diplomacy at the moment of the great world crisis in July 1914. Militärisch-politische Zwangslage, die unsere Diplomatie im Moment der großen Weltkrisis im Juli 1914 geradezu in Fesseln schlug."
- Ritter, Gerhard (1964). Staatskunst und Kriegshandwerk: Die Tragödie der Staatkunst: Bethmann Hollweg als Kriegskanzler 1914-1917. Munich: R. Oldenbourg. OCLC 889047603.
- Röhl, John C. G. (2014). Kaiser Wilhelm II: A Concise Life. Translated by Sheila de Bellaigue. Cambridge University Press. ISBN 978-1-107-07225-1.
- Rössler, Hellmuth; Franz, Günther (1958). Sachwörterbuch zur deutschen Geschichte [Dictionary of German History] (in German). Munich: Oldenbourg.
- Rovan, Joseph (1999). Histoire de l'Allemagne: des origines à nos jours [History of Germany: from its origins to the present day]. Points Histoire. Paris: Seuil. ISBN 978-2020351362. OCLC 1071615619.
- Schmidt, Stefan (5 June 2014). Frankreichs Außenpolitik in der Julikrise 1914: Ein Beitrag zur Geschichte des Ausbruchs des Ersten Weltkrieges. Pariser Historische Studien #90. Munich: R. Oldenbourg. pp. 417–. ISBN 978-3-486-59016-6. ISSN 0479-5997. OCLC 552973462.
- Schmitt, Bernadotte E. (1 April 1937). "France and the Outbreak of the World War". Foreign Affairs. 26 (3). Council on Foreign Relations: 516–536. doi:10.2307/20028790. JSTOR 20028790. Archived from the original on 25 November 2018.
- Schroeder, Paul W (27 September 2016) [1st pub. 2004:Palgrave Macmillan]. "Embedded counterfactuals and World War I as an unavoidable war.". In Schroeder, Paul W (ed.). Systems, Stability, and Statecraft: Essays on the International History of Modern Europe. New York: Palgrave Macmillan. ISBN 978-1-137-06138-6.
- Soutou, Georges-Henri (1994). "Die Kriegsziele des Deutschen Reiches, Frankreichs, Großbritanniens und der Vereinigten Staaten während des Ersten Weltkrieges: ein Vergleich" [The war aims of the German Empire, France, Great Britain, and the United States during World War I: a comparison.]. In Michalka, Wolfgang (ed.). Der Erste Weltkrieg: Wirkung, Wahrnehmung, Analyse [The First World War : impact, awareness, analysis]. Piper Series (in German). Munich: Piper. ISBN 978-3-492-11927-6. OCLC 906656746.
- Strachan, Hew (2004). "Wer war schuld? – Wie es zum Ersten Weltkrieg kam." [Who was to blame? - How the First World War came about.]. In Burgdorff, Stephan; Andresen, Karen (eds.). Der Erste Weltkrieg: die Urkatastrophe des 20. Jahrhunderts (in German). Munich: Deutsche Verlags-Anstalt. ISBN 978-3-421-05778-5. OCLC 888153622.
- Thoss, Bruno (1994). "Der Erste Weltkrieg als Ereignis und Erlebnis. Paradigmenwechsel in der westdeutschen Weltkriegsforschung seit der Fischer-Kontroverse" [The First World War as event and experience. Paradigm Shift in West German World War Research since the Fischer Controversy]. In Wolfgang Michalka (ed.). Der Erste Weltkrieg: Wirkung, Wahrnehmung, Analyse [The First World War : impact, awareness, analysis]. Piper Series (in German). Munich: Piper. ISBN 978-3-492-11927-6. OCLC 906656746.
- Traverso, Enzo (7 February 2017) [1st pub. Stock (2007)]. Fire and Blood: The European Civil War, 1914-1945. London: Verso. ISBN 978-1-78478-136-1. OCLC 999636811.
- Collectif (1919). Traité de Versailles 1919 [Treaty of Versailles 1919] (in French). Nancy: Librairie militaire Berger Levrault.
- Vocelka, Michaela; Vocelka, Karl (2015). Franz Joseph I: Kaiser von Österreich und König von Ungarn 1830-1916 : eine Biographie. Munich: C.H. Beck. ISBN 978-3-406-68286-5.
- Von Mises, Ludwig (1944). Omnipotent government the rise of the total state and total war. New Haven: Yale Univ. Press. OCLC 248739093.
- von Strandmann, Pogge (1994). "Britische Historiker und der Ausbruch des Ersten Weltkriegs" [British historians and the outbreak of the First World War]. In Michalka, Wolfgang (ed.). Der Erste Weltkrieg: Wirkung, Wahrnehmung, Analyse [The First World War : impact, awareness, analysis]. Piper Series (in German). Munich: Piper. ISBN 978-3-492-11927-6. OCLC 906656746.
- von Thaer, Albrecht (1958). Generalstabsdienst an der Front und in der O. H. L.: Aus Briefen und Tagebuchaufzeichnungen, 1915-1919. Abhandlungen der Akademie der Wissenschaften in Go̊ttingen : philol.-hist. Klasse, 3, 40. Vandenhoeck & Ruprecht. OCLC 84856776.
- von Wegerer, Alfred (1930) [1st pub. Reimar Hobbing: (1928)]. A Refutation of the Versailles War Guilt Thesis. New York: A.A. Knopf. OCLC 220450631.
- von Wegerer, Alfred (1934). "Versailles und die Ehre der Nation" [Versailles and the Honor of the Nation]. Berliner Monatshefte (in German) (12): 1.
- Wehler, Hans-Ulrich (2003). Deutsche Gesellschaftsgeschichte. Band 4: Vom Beginn des Ersten Weltkrieges bis zur Gründung der beiden deutschen Staaten 1914–1949 [German Social History. Vol. 4: From the Beginning of World War I to the Founding of the Two German States, 1914-1949.]. Vol. 4 (2nd, revised ed.). Munich: C.H. Beck.
- Wittgens, Herman J. (1980). "War Guilt Propaganda Conducted by the German Foreign Ministry During the 1920s". Historical Papers. 15 (1). Canadian Historical Association: 228–247. doi:10.7202/030859ar. ISSN 0068-8878. OCLC 1159619139.
- Zilch, Reinhold (1987). Die Reichsbank und die finanzielle Kriegsvorbereitung von 1907 bis 1914 [The Reichsbank and the Financial Preparation for War from 1907 to 1914] (in German). Berlin: Akademie-Verlag. p. 79. ISBN 3-05-000243-3.
