= Pierre Renouvin =

French historian

Pierre Renouvin (January 9, 1893 – December 7, 1974) was a French historian of international relations.

== Early life and education ==
He was born in Paris and attended Lycée Louis-le-Grand, where he was awarded his aggrégation in 1912. Renouvin spent 1912-1914 traveling in Germany and Russia. Renouvin married Marie-Therese Gabalda (1894-1982) and worked as teacher between 1918 and 1920 at Lycée d’Orleans.

== Career ==
Renouvin served as the director of the War History Library at the Sorbonne between 1920 and 1922, as lecturer at the Sorbonne between 1922 and 1933 and as a professor at the Sorbonne between 1933 and 1964. He also taught at the Paris Institute of Political Studies (Sciences Po) from 1938 to 1970.

== Military service ==
Renouvin served as an infantryman in World War I and was badly wounded in action in April 1917, losing his left arm and the use of his right hand.

== Shows German guilt in World War I ==
Renouvin began his historical career specializing on the origins of the French Revolution, especially the Assembly of Notables of 1787 for which he was awarded his PhD. After World War I, he turned to the study of the origins of World War I. As a veteran whose body had been scarred by the war, Renouvin was very interested in knowing why the war had begun. In the interwar period, the question of responsibility of the war had immense political implications because the German government kept on insisting that because of the Article 231 of the Treaty of Versailles was the "war guilt clause", the entire treaty rested upon Article 231, and if it could be proven that Germany was not responsible for the war, the moral basis of Versailles would be undermined. As such, the Auswärtiges Amt had a War Guilt Section, devoted solely to proving that the Reich was not responsible for the war of 1914, and funded the work of Americans like historian Harry Elmer Barnes who likewise was determined that it was the allies who were the aggressors of 1914.

In 1925, Renouvin published two books, described as “definitive” by historian David Robin Watson in The Encyclopedia of Historians and Historical Writing about World War I. In the first book, Les Origines immédiates de la guerre (28 juin-4 août 1914), Renouvin showed that Germany was responsible for the First World War, and France had not started the war. In Les Origines immédiates de la guerre, Renouvin wrote about the origins of the war:

Germany and Austria did not agree to accept any other solution other than the resort to force; they decided on their plan deliberately and after coolly considering all the possible consequences. With regard to the immediate origins of the conflict, this is the fact that dominates all the others

American historian Jay Winter and French historian Antoine Prost wrote in 2005 about Renouvin: "We have come back full circle to his position, published only seven years after the end of the conflict. One can only admire how scholarly and cautious he was, and how well his conclusions have stood the test of time". In the second book Les Formes du gouvernement de guerre, Renouvin offered a comparative political history of Germany and France in the First World War, describing how France was able under the strain of war to preserve her democracy, but in Germany, what small elements of democracy that had existed in 1914 had been swept away by military dictatorship by 1916, headed by Field Marshal Paul von Hindenburg and General Erich Ludendorff.

Both books involved Renouvin in a polemical debate with the French left, German historians and German apologists like Harry Elmer Barnes, who claimed that it was France and Russia that were the aggressors in the July Crisis of 1914. In the 1920s, it was often claimed that from 1912 to 1914, there had been a strategy of Poincaré-la-guerre (Poincaré's War) and that French President Raymond Poincaré had, supposedly in conjunction with Emperor Nicholas II of Russia planned an aggressive war to dismember Germany. By a close study of the documents then available in the 1920s, Renouvin was able to rebut the charges of both Poincaré-la-guerre and of Germany being a victim of Franco-Russian aggression, and subsequent research since then has confirmed Renouvin's initial conclusions. Renouvin's work was funded by the French government to rebut the claims of the War Guilt Section of the Auswärtiges Amt, and French leftists attacked Renouvin for being an "official" historian, but Renouvin was critical of aspects of French prewar policy.

He was the first historian to expose the French Yellow Book of 1914, a collection of diplomatic documents relating to the July Crisis, for containing forgeries. Renouvin described his work in 1929 as:

Tens of thousands of diplomatic documents to read, the testimony of hundreds of thousands of witnesses to be sought out and criticized, a maze of controversy and debate to be traversed in quest of some occasional revelation of importance-this is the task of the historian who undertakes to attack as a whole the great problem of the origins of the World War

During the 1920s, one of the most popular historians on the subject of the July Crisis was the American Barnes, who was closely associated with and funded by the Centre for the Study of the Causes of the War in Berlin headed by the prominent völkisch activist Major Alfred von Wegerer, a pseudohistorical research institute secretly funded by the German government, who had emerged as the world's leading advocate of the thesis that First World War was indeed Poincaré-la-guerre.

After publishing his book The Genesis of the World War in 1926, Barnes was invited by the former German Emperor Wilhelm II to visit him in his Dutch exile to thank him personally. An awestruck Barnes wrote back to describe his meeting with the former Kaiser: "His Imperial Majesty was happy to know that I did not blame him for starting the war in 1914.... He disagreed with my view that Russia and France were chiefly responsible. He held that the villains of 1914 were the International Jews and Free Masons, who, he alleged, desired to destroy national states and the Christian religion".

Wilhelm's anti-Semitic remarks about the war being the work of the Jews set Barnes off in an increasing bizarre anti-Semitic search to blame all of the world's problems on the Jews, a process that culminated after 1945 when Barnes become one of the world's first Holocaust deniers. Given that Renouvin and Barnes had markedly different views on who was responsible for the war and in light of Barnes's tendency to personally attack anyone whose views differed from him in the vituperative language possible, often accompanied by claims that Barnes's targets were just puppets of the Jews, Renouvin and Barnes became involved in a rancorous debate about just who was responsible for the war.

Because the German government had published a selective and misleading collection of documents relating to the July Crisis, and the French government had not published any documents from the Quai d'Orsay, Renouvin's work was not widely accepted in the 1920s, but a fuller opening of the German archives after World War II has validated Renouvin's scholarship. Renouvin himself often complained in the 1920s and 1930s that the Quai d'Orsay's policy of keeping its archives closed while the Auswärtiges Amt was publishing its archives made the former seem like it had something to hide and so made ordinary people all over the world more open to the German case. Renouvin himself took the lead in having the French archives opened and became the president of the French historical commission in charge of publishing the French documents relating to the July Crisis. Renouvin himself created a magazine relating to the subject, Revue d'histoire de la Guerre Mondiale (Review of the History of the World War), and he published another book on the subject, La Crise européenne et la grande guerre (The European Crisis and the Great War), in 1934.

== Forces profondes ==
In addition, Renouvin expanded his historical work to feature broader studies of international relations. In 1946, Renouvin published La Question d'Extrême Orient, 1840-1940 (The Question of the Far East, 1840-1940), which was followed by Histoire des relations internationales between 1953 and 1958, which covered international history from the Middle Ages to 1945. In 1964, Renouvin published, with French historian Jean-Baptiste Duroselle (1917-1994), Introduction à l'histoire des relations internationales (Introduction to the History of International Relations).

As a historian, Renouvin came to be more and more concerned with the broader social forces that influenced diplomatic history. Together with protégés Duroselle and Maurice Baumont (1892-1981), he started a new type of international history that included taking into what Renouvin called forces profondes (profound forces) like the influence of domestic politics on foreign policy. In many ways, Renouvin's work with forces profondes was the diplomatic historians' equivalent to the Annales school.

== L'Armistice de Rethondes ==
In his 1968 book L'Armistice de Rethondes (The Armistice of Rethondes), Renouvin examined how World War I ended in November 1918. Renouvin argued that the armistice that ended the war on 11 November 1918 was a product of not only the military situation but also public opinion in the Allied nations and that the armistice predetermined many aspects of the Treaty of Versailles in June 1919, thus ensuring that US President Woodrow Wilson had less room for manoeuvre during the Paris peace conference than was often presumed. Renouvin maintained that after the failure of the Kaiserschlacht ("Emperor's Battle"), the "final offensive" that intended to win the war for Germany in the spring of 1918, the Allies had turned the tide and that from the summer of 1918, the Allies were, slowly but surely, pushing the Germans out of France.

Renouvin noted that 8 August 1918 was the "black day of the German Army", as it marked the successful beginning of the Battle of Amiens, with the Canadian Corps of the British Expeditionary Force smashing through the German lines, leading to the Hundreds Days' Offensive with the French, British Commonwealth and American forces steadily advancing through Northern France and into Belgium. By October 1918, the Ottoman Empire had surrendered, Austria-Hungary had collapsed as a state following a French-led offensive in the Balkans under the command of Marshal Louis Franchet d'Espèrey and America's enormous industrial capacity and manpower meant that Germany had no hope of victory in the long run even if it had somehow managed to stabilise the situation to its advantage in the fall of 1918.

In October 1918, American forces had broken through at Verdun, leading to the much-feared "rupture" on the Western Front through which the Allies could advance. Renouvin argued that given the direction that the war had been taken by late 1918, "Plan 1919", Marshal Ferdinand Foch's plan for an offensive in the spring of 1919 to take the Allies straight to Berlin, would certainly have succeeded if it had been launched.

In the midst of the disastrous situation for the Reich, the Kiel mutiny broke out when the sailors of the High Seas Fleet refused to set out on a "death cruise" against the British Navy. For the admirals who ordered the assault without the knowledge of the German government, it was an attempt to save their honour and that of the German Navy, with no regard as to whether they won or lost. Renouvin wrote that the mutiny forecast a social revolution which the elites feared more than they did their foreign enemies, and that as a result they had no reason to support a continuation of the war.

Renouvin noted that such was the determination of German elites to salvage something out of the catastrophe of 1918 that the German officer corps, which had been a bastion of monarchism, turned against the monarchy with Wilhelm's generals ordering him to abdicate. The Allies had made it clear that they would not sign an armistice with him under any conditions. Renouvin wrote that "Wilson did not know Europe" by ignoring the wishes of the Allies and American public opinion, which did not want any halfway measures that might allow Germany to fight again. Renouvin argued that Wilson had no masterplan for the peace, improvised his diplomacy in response to events and vastly overrated his personal powers of persuasion when it came to dealing with both friends and foes.

Renouvin maintained that the armistice of 11 November 1918 was a muddled affair on both sides. The Germans signed the armistice only to end a losing war and were prepared to resume the struggle if an opportune moment occurred. For exactly that reason, French and the British had insisted on an armistice so harsh that Germany could never resume the war. Renouvin stated that Wilson wanted the Germany to continue to exist as a state because as long as it remained, the Allies needed US assistance, which gave Wilson leverage in negotiating a peace that would be favourable to US interests. Renouvin argued that at the same time, Wilson did not want Germany to resume its quest for "world power status," which might one day threaten the United States and so Wilson was not the advocate of a generous peace towards Germany that English-speaking historians often liked to claim.

To resolve the dilemma, Renouvin wrote that Wilson had agreed to the Anglo-French demand for a harsh armistice but at the same time promised the Germans that the Fourteen Points, a set of vague and idealistic war aims that he had introduced earlier in 1918, would be the basis of peace. Renouvin argued that the new leaders of Germany, knowing very well that they were defeated, were still committed to maintaining it as a great power. He wrote that for German elites, annexing Austria on the basis of self-determination that was promised in the Fourteen Points and having economic domination over Central and Eastern Europe were the best that could be managed in conditions of late 1918 and would be the basis for a revival of German power when the time came.

Renouvin stated that the armistice of 1918 was the worst possible way to end the war since it codified a situation with too many clashing interests. French public opinion believed that France would annex the Rhineland after the war, an impression reinforced by the armistice's demand for the Allies to occupy the Rhineland, which occurred in December 1918. Soviet Russia's aim of spreading communism all over the world meant that the new Soviet regime could never be a constructive force in international relations. British leaders were worried that the November Revolution, which had toppled the German monarchy, might be the beginning of a broader revolutionary that would sweep over and bring communism to all over Europe. Wilson's claim that he could make peace on the basis of the Fourteen Points and destroy German militarism forever was totally unrealistic.

Renouvin wrote that signing an armistice with Germany meant that the German government was going to be the Allied partner for peace, even as an unequal partner. Once the fighting stopped on 11 November 1918, the pressure of public opinion, which did not want to see the war resumed, meant that the Allied leaders had to make a peace that the Germans would not reject out of hand. Renouvin argued that after the armistice, public opinion in the Allied nations changed, and ordinary people did not want to see the resumption of the war that had killed and wounded so many, which limited the options of the Allied leaders for peacemaking in 1919.

Renouvin wrote of all the contradictions of the armistice, which created facts on the ground that were difficult to change and how the very differing interests of the powers became the basis of the Treaty of Versailles in June 1919. The compromise peace that displeased everyone since it did not destroy Germany as a great power but was so irksome enough to ensure that the Germans would never accept it as legitimate.

Renouvin noted that the Allies had imposed the Treaty of Versailles in June 1919, but the responsibility for fulfilling it rested with the Germans, who could scarcely be expected to embrace a treaty designed to block them from "world power status" permanently. Renouvin further argued that the need to safeguard France's 'security" was incompatible with Germany's ambitions to become a world power. The compromise treaty provided France with the illusion that its security was safeguarded. However, it ensured that the basis for a revival of German power were in place. Renouvin concluded that it would have been better if the armistice of 1918 had not been signed and if the Allies had instead continued the war into 1919.

His many disciples included not just French but also foreign historians as the famous Greek scholar Dimitri Kitsikis, in whose honour Greece created the Dimitri Kitsikis Public Foundation.

== Works ==
- Les formes du gouvernement de guerre, 1925.
- Les Origines immédiates de la guerre (28 juin-4 août 1914), 1925.
- La Crise europenne et la grande guerre, 1904-1918, 1934.
- La Question d'Extrême Orient, 1840-1940, 1946.
- Les Crises du XXe Siècle de 1929-1945, 1958.
- Co-written with Jean-Baptiste Duroselle: Introduction à l'histoire des relations internationales, Colin: Paris 1964.

== General sources ==
- Duroselle, Jean-Baptiste "Pierre Renouvin" pages 497-507 from Revue d'Histoire Moderne et Contemporaine, Volume 27, 1975.
- Halperin, S.W. Some Twentieth-Century Historians: Essays on Eminent Europeans (University of Chicago Press, 1961). pp 143–70
- Jackson, Peter (2006). "Post-War Politics and the Historiography of French Strategy and Diplomacy Before the Second World War". History Compass. 4 (5): 870–905. doi:10.1111/j.1478-0542.2006.00344.x.
- Lipstadt, Deborah (1993). Denying the Holocaust: The Growing Assault on Truth and Memory. New York: Free Press / Plume. ISBN 978-0452272743.
- Mombauer, Annika (2002). The Origins of the First World War: Controversies and Consensus. Routledge. ISBN 978-0582418721.
- Moore, James (1974). "Woodrow Wilson and Post-Armistice Diplomacy: Some French Views". Reviews in American History. 2 (2): 207–213. doi:10.2307/2701654. JSTOR 2701654.
- Renouvin, Pierre (1966). Mélanges Pierre Renouvin: études d'histoire des relations internationals. Études et méthodes. Vol. 13. PUF.
- Watson, David Robin (1999). "Renouvin, Pierre". In Kelly Boyd (ed.). Encyclopedia of Historians and Historical Writers (1st ed.). Routledge. ISBN 978-1884964336.
- Winter, Jay; Proust, Antoine (2005). The Great War In History: Debates and Controversies, 1914 to the Present. CUP. ISBN 978-0521850834.
