= Commission of Responsibilities =

The Commission on the Responsibility of the Authors of the War and on Enforcement of Penalties was a commission established at the Paris Peace Conference in 1919. Its role was to examine the background of the First World War, and to investigate and recommend individuals for prosecution for committing war crimes.

== Background ==
During the First World War, the Allied governments had decided to try defeated leaders whom they considered responsible for violations of international law and the laws of war. For that purpose, it was decided to establish an expert committee to make recommendations to that effect. Following the conclusion of the Armistice in November 1918, preparations began. The defeated German government officially concurred with the initiative on grounds that:

A complete truthful account of the world conditions and of the negotiations among the powers in July 1914 and of the steps taken at that time by the several governments could and would go far toward demolishing the walls of hatred and misconstruction erected by the long war to separate the peoples.

In addition, the German government proposed the establishment of a neutral committee of experts to study the matter. The Allied governments refused, claiming that:

they [the Allied governments] do not consider that the German proposal requires any reply as the responsibility of Germany for the war has been long ago incontestably proved.

== Composition of the Commission ==
The commission was established at the conference plenary session of 25 January 1919, and consisted of representatives of the five major Allied powers – the US, the British Empire, France, Italy, and Japan – with the addition of Belgium, Greece, Poland, Romania and Serbia (later: Kingdom of Serbs, Croats and Slovenes). Its members were as follows:

USA:

- Robert Lansing, United States Secretary of State
- James Brown Scott, professor of law at Johns Hopkins University

British Empire:

- Gordon Hewart, Attorney General
- or: Ernest Pollock, Solicitor General
- William Massey, Prime Minister of New Zealand

France:

- André Tardieu, Commissioner General for Franco-American Affairs of War
- alternate: Captain R. Masson
- Ferdinand Larnaude, Dean of the Paris Law Faculty

Italy:

- Vittorio Scialoja, Senator, Foreign Minister after 26 November 1919
- alternates: A. Ricci-Busatti, chief of the claims section in the Ministry of Foreign Affairs, and Gustavo Tosti, Consul General
- Raimondo
- then: G. Brambilla, Counselor of Legation (3 February)
- then: M. d'Amelio, counselor to the Court of Cassation (16 February)

Japan:

- Mineichirō Adachi, Envoy Extraordinary and Minister Plenipotentiary to Belgium
- Harukazu Nagaoka, counselor of the Japanese Embassy in France
- then: Sakutaro Tachi, law professor at Tokyo Imperial University (15 February)

Belgium:

- Edouard Rolin-Jaequemyns, Secretary General of the Belgian Delegation to the Peace Conference

Greece:

- Nikolaos Politis, Foreign Minister

Poland:

- Constantin Skirmunt, member of the Polish National Committee
- then: Leon Łubieński, member of the Polish National Committee (14 February)

Romania:

- S. Rosental, legal consultant

Serbia (later: Kingdom of Serbs, Croats and Slovenes):

- Slobodan Jovanović, law professor at the University of Belgrade
- alternates: Kosta Kumanudi, law professor at the University of Belgrade, and Mileta Novaković, lecturer at the University of Belgrade

The Commission was divided into three sub-commissions as follows:

- on Criminal Acts, charged with investigating into war crimes allegations
- on Responsibility for the War, charged with recommending which individuals to indict for bringing about the war (on the diplomatic level)
- on Responsibility for the Violation of the Laws and Customs of War, charged with deciding whom to indict for crimes committed during the war

== Recommendations made by the Commission ==
=== Majority opinion ===
The Commission submitted its report on 29 March 1919. It concluded that blame for the war lay in the first instance with the governments of Germany and Austria-Hungary, and secondly with those of Bulgaria and Turkey. It recommended the establishment of an additional commission for a more exhaustive study of the alleged crimes of the defeated powers. It further recommended the establishment of an international tribunal for the prosecution of suspected war criminals, with no immunity from prosecution even for defeated heads of state. It recommended that the tribunal should consist of 22 judges, three from each of the five major powers and an additional six from other countries.

=== Dissenting opinion by the US delegation ===
The US delegates submitted their own opinion on 4 April 1919, expressing their reservations on the report. They suggested refraining from prosecuting heads of state, and focusing instead on lower levels of the government and military. They also suggested that defeated leaders or commanders should not be charged with acts not considered criminal at the time of their commission, i.e. that rules of conduct should not be imposed retroactively. They also argued that there should not be a permanent international tribunal for war crimes, but that, following any future war, such a tribunal should be established by the governments of the nations directly affected.

=== Dissenting opinion by the Japanese delegation ===
On the same day the US delegation submitted its minority opinion, the Japanese delegation submitted its own reservations. The Japanese delegation's main reservation was about the demand to indict heads of state for violations.

== Legacy of the Commission ==
The Commission's recommendations were not carried through at the time. The proposed international tribunal for war crimes was not established, because of the refusal of the German government to cooperate. Instead, a few German individuals accused of war crimes were tried in 1921 at the Leipzig War Crimes Trials by the German authorities themselves. However, the recommendations did bear fruit in the longer term. Following the Second World War, two international Allied tribunals were established in Nuremberg and Tokyo to try German and Japanese leaders accused of war crimes. The demand for a permanent tribunal for crimes against humanity continued even after those tribunals had been dissolved, leading eventually to the establishment of the International Criminal Court in 2002.

== See also ==
- Article 231
- Centre for the Study of the Causes of the War
- Historiography of the causes of World War I
- Reichstag inquiry into guilt for World War I
- War guilt question
