= Imanuel Geiss =

German historian (1931– 2012)

Imanuel Geiss (9 February 1931 – 20 February 2012) was a German historian.

== Life ==
Imanuel Geiss was born in Frankfurt am Main, the youngest of the five children of a working-class family affected by the economic crisis. His unemployed father had to raise the children alone as their mother suffered from meningitis. She was killed in 1941 by Aktion T4 after the father had died in 1940. The five children were brought to a rather liberal orphan home which made it possible for Imanuel to study after completing his Abitur in 1951 at Carl-Schurz-Gymnasium.

He became a certified translator for French and English at the Auslands- und Dolmetscherinstitut in Germersheim, which allowed him to finance studies beginning in 1955.

Geiss died, aged 81, in Bremen.

== Work ==
- Der polnische Grenzstreifen 1914–1918. Ein Beitrag zur deutschen Kriegszielpolitik im Ersten Weltkrieg. Dissertation (Universität Hamburg, 1959), Moll/Winter, Hamburg/Lübeck, 1960.
- Juli 1914. Die europäische Krise und der Ausbruch des Ersten Weltkriegs. hrsg. von Imanuel Geiss, 3. Aufl., dtv, München, 1988 (Dokumentenedition, first as 1964); English as: July 1914: The Outbreak of the First World War, Selected Documents, London: Batsford, 1967.
- Gewerkschaften in Afrika. Hannover, 1965.
- Panafrikanismus. Zur Geschichte der Dekolonisation. Habilitation, EVA, Frankfurt am Main 1968; English as: The Pan-African Movement. London: Methuen, 1974, ISBN 0-416-16710-1 and as: The Pan-African Movement. A history of Pan-Africanism in America, Europe and Africa. New York: Africana Publ., 1974, ISBN 0-8419-0161-9.
- Die Afro-Amerikaner. Frankfurt am Main: EVA, 1969.
- Fünfzehn Millionen beleidigte Deutsche oder Woher kommt die CDU? Beiträge zur Kontinuität der bürgerlichen Parteien. hrsg. von Imanuel Geiss und Volker Ullrich, Reinbek bei Hamburg: Rowohlt, 1972, ISBN 3-499-11414-3.
- Studien über Geschichte und Geschichtswissenschaft. 2. Aufl., Frankfurt am Main: Suhrkamp, 1974 (zuerst 1972).
- Tocqueville und das Zeitalter der Revolution. München, 1972, ISBN 3-485-03204-2.
- Was wird aus der Bundesrepublik? Die Deutschen zwischen Sozialismus und Revolution. Hamburg: Hoffmann und Campe, 1973, ISBN 3-455-09098-2.
- Ansichten einer künftigen Geschichtswissenschaft. hrsg. von Imanuel Geiss und Rainer Tamchina, 2 Bände, München: Hanser, 1980 (zuerst 1974).
- German Foreign Policy, 1871–1914, Boston 1976
- Imperialismus im 20. Jahrhundert Gedenkschrift für George W. F. Hallgarten. hrsg. von Imanuel Geiss und Joachim Radkau, München: Beck, 1976.
- Das Deutsche Reich und der Erste Weltkrieg. München/Wien: Hanser, 1978, ISBN 3-446-12495-0.
- Das Deutsche Reich und die Vorgeschichte des Ersten Weltkriegs. München/Wien: Hanser, 1978, ISBN 3-446-12494-2.
- Geschichte griffbereit. 6 Bände (Daten, Personen, Schauplätze, Begriffe, Staaten, Epochen), 3. Aufl., Gütersloh, 2002, ISBN 3-577-14610-9 (erstmals Reinbek bei Hamburg, 1979).
- War and Empire in the Twentieth Century. Aberdeen: Aberdeen University Press, 1983, ISBN 0-08-030387-0.
- Geschichte im Überblick. Daten, Fakten und Zusammenhänge der Weltgeschichte. Reinbek bei Hamburg: Rowohlt, 2006, ISBN 3-499-62087-1 (überarbeitete Neuausgabe, Original 1986).
- Geschichte des Rassismus. 4. Aufl., Frankfurt am Main: Suhrkamp, 1993 (zuerst 1988), ISBN 3-518-11530-8 (Inhalt, PDF, 17 KB).
- Die Habermas-Kontroverse. Ein deutscher Streit. Berlin: Siedler, 1988. ISBN 3-88680-328-7.
- Massaker in der Weltgeschichte. Ein Versuch über Grenzen der Menschlichkeit. In: Eckhard Jesse, Uwe Backes und Rainer Zitelmann: Die Schatten der Vergangenheit. Impulse zur Historisierung des Nationalsozialismus. 2. Aufl., Frankfurt am Main/Berlin: Ullstein, 1992 (zuerst 1990), S. 110–135, ISBN 3-548-33161-0.
- Der Hysterikerstreit. Ein unpolemischer Essay. Bonn: Bouvier, u.a. 1992. ISBN 3-416-02370-6.
- Die deutsche Frage 1806–1990. Mannheim: Bibliographisches Institut, 1992, ISBN 978-3411101511; English as The Question of German Unification: 1806–1990. London/New York: Routledge, 1997, ISBN 978-0415150491.
- Zukunft als Geschichte. Historisch-politische Analysen und Prognosen zum Untergang des Sowjetkommunismus, 1980–1991. Stuttgart: Steiner, 1998, ISBN 3-515-07223-3.
- Geschichte im Oratorium. Von der Schöpfung zur Apokalypse. Eine historische Handreichung für die Chorarbeit. Berlin: Talpa-Verlag, 1999, ISBN 3-933689-02-3.
- Deutschland vor 1914. In: Jean-Paul Cahn, Bernard Poloni, Gérard Schneilin (Hrsg.): Le Reich allemand du départ de Bismarck à la Première Guerre mondiale (1890–1914). Nantes, 2003, S. 212–224, ISBN 2-84274-242-7 (PDF, 223 KB).
- Nation und Nationalismen. Versuche über ein Weltproblem, 1962–2006. Bremen, 2007, ISBN 3-934686-43-5.
- Krieg – eine unendliche Geschichte. Peter Lang Verlag, Frankfurt am Main, Bern 2014, ISBN 978-3-631-62623-8.
