= Centre for the Study of the Causes of the War =

Think tank in Germany

The Centre for the Study of the Causes of the War (in German: Zentralstelle zur Erforschung der Kriegsursachen) was a think tank based in Berlin, funded by the German government, whose sole purpose was to disseminate the official government position that Germany was the victim of Allied aggression in 1914, and hence the alleged moral invalidity of the Versailles Treaty. Of the many provisions in the treaty, Article 231 required Germany to accept responsibility for the damages it caused during the war and, under the terms of articles 232–248, to disarm, make substantial territorial concessions and pay reparations to some of the victorious countries. Although neither the Entente powers at the time nor subsequent historical consensus attached the idea of war guilt to these articles, Germany viewed them as a humiliation and as being forced to accept full responsibility for causing the war.

The Centre was founded in 1921 under a Swiss doctor, Ernst von Sauerbeck, and from 1923 headed by a former völkisch activist, Major Alfred von Wegerer.

== Background ==
The Centre was part of an official campaign by the Weimar Republic and then the Third Reich to counter Allied charges of German war guilt, and suggest consequences. German Governments sought to organise materials from 1914 onwards to counter questions on origins of the war. The key elements of German effort were the War Guilt Section of the Foreign Ministry, the Kriegsschuldreferat, the Working Committee of German Associations (Arbeitsausschuss Deutscher Verbände), the Centre for the Study of the Causes of the War (Zentralstelle zur Erforschung der Kriegschuldfrage) and a Parliamentary Committee of Enquiry (Untersuchungsausschuss); they used sympathetic writers and translators, and watered down the more controversial memoirs. The Kriegsschuldreferat was established in the Foreign Ministry in December 1918/January 1919 under Bernhard von Bülow ("ardent nationalist and zealous bureaucrat"). Its primary task was to prepare the case before the Peace Conference against the Allied charge that Germany and Austria-Hungary were solely responsible for the war. Von Bülow instructed Hans Freytag, the later head of the Kriegsschuldreferat, to lock up all documents "in case the entente should demand them" 'as they apparently had the right to do under article 230 of the Versailles Treaty', so "they could be got out of the way easily". Documents were divided into "defence" and "offence".

On 7 May 1919, the Allies presented the proposed accord, and on 28 May 1919 Germany published Deutschland Schuldig?, a collection of documents intended to show that Germany had conducted a defensive war. On 16 June 1919, Georges Clemenceau, the French president, presented an ultimatum to Germany—if it did not accept the peace treaty, war would recommence—and on 28 June 1919 Germany accepted the Versailles Treaty. The immediate need to refute war guilt was replaced by a long-term project agreed by Cabinet on 21 July 1919 to shift attention from war guilt to a debate about European affairs since 1870. This project had three editors: Mendelssohn-Bartoldy, Lepsius, and Thimme (Director and "special advisor". The German Foreign Ministry directed the editors on how and what to publish and exercised a special veto. The result was the 40 volumes of Die Grosse Politik der Europäischen Kabinette 1922-27, which became the standard work of reference for the German view of World War I.

== History ==
To disseminate the government's official position, several "independent" bureaus and journals were established, and many writers were paid for articles of a refutational nature. Besides a wide range of effort to promote its position, works of sympathetic writers were translated into a number of languages and disseminated at government expense, and visits by such writers were also paid for. As part of this effort, the Centre for the Study of the Causes of the War (Zentralstelle zur Erforschung der Kriegschuldfrage (ZEK)) was founded in 1921 under a Swiss doctor, Ernst von Sauerbeck, and from 1923 under Alfred von Wegerer.

Harry Elmer Barnes, an American, who between World War I and World War II was a well-known anti-war writer, a leader in the historical revisionism movement and later to become a Holocaust denier, and from 1924 onwards worked closely with the Centre for the Study of the Causes of the War. The Centre provided Barnes with research material, made funds available to him, translated his writings into other languages, and funded his trip to Germany in 1926. During Barnes's 1926 trip to Germany he received a most friendly welcome for his efforts as Barnes described it in "seeking to clear Germany of the dishonour and fraud of the war-guilt clause of the Treaty of Versailles".

The mission of the Centre became increasingly irrelevant as it was subsumed into the official position of the Nazi government after 1933, and especially after Hitler's revocation of Germany's signature on the Treaty of Versailles in 1937.

== See also ==
- Causes of World War I
- Color book
- War guilt question
- World War I
