= Causes of World War I =

European diplomatic alignments shortly before the war. The Ottomans joined the Central Powers shortly after the war started, with Bulgaria joining the following year. Italy remained neutral in 1914 and joined the Allies in 1915.

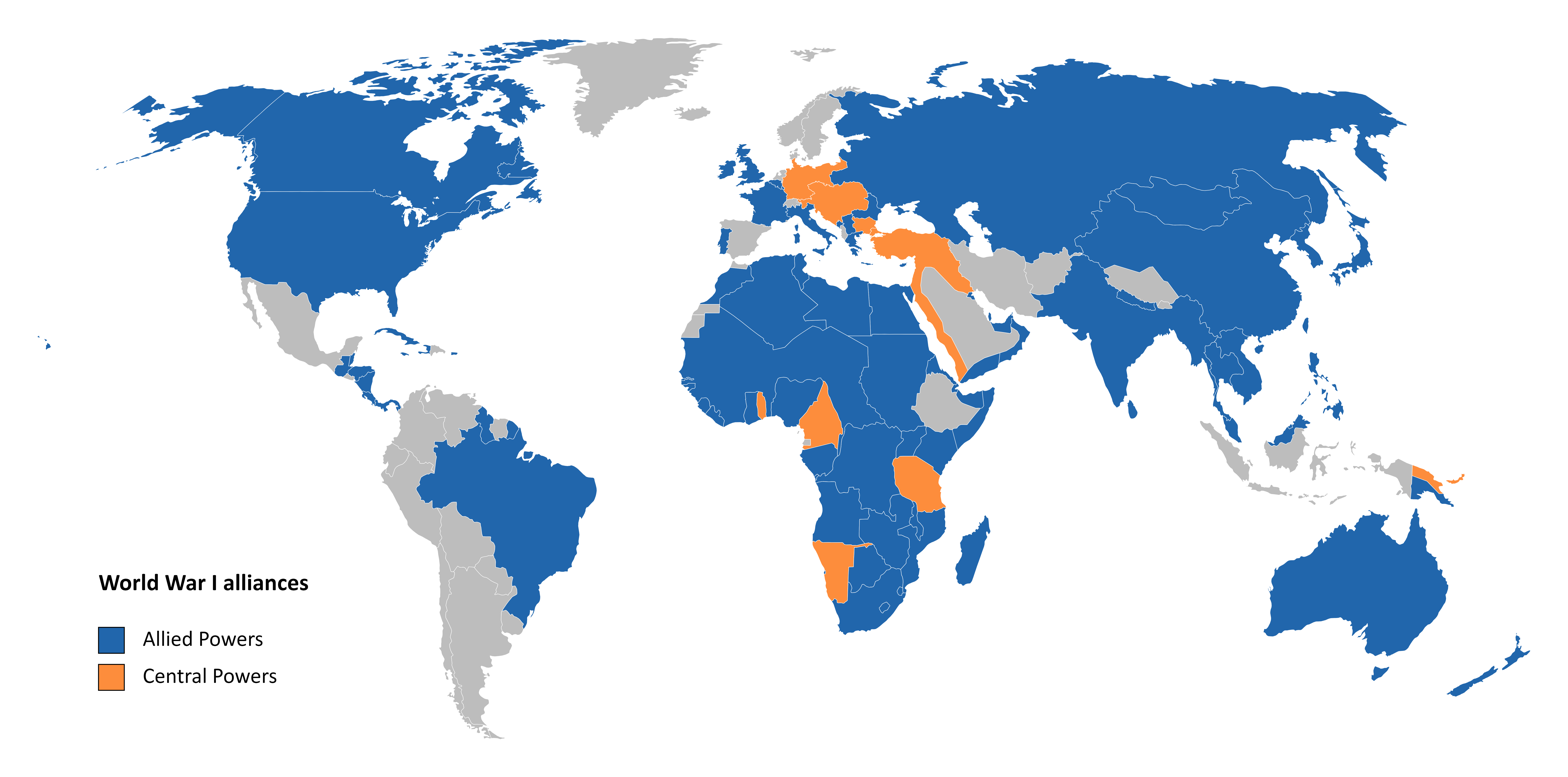
Map of the world with participants in World War I after U.S. entry (6 April 1917), but before the October Revolution (7 November 1917): Allied Powers (Entente) Central Powers Neutral countries

Identifying the causes of World War I remains a debated issue. World War I began in the Balkans on 28 July 1914, and hostilities ended on 11 November 1918, leaving 17 million dead and 25 million wounded. Moreover, the Russian Civil War can in many ways be considered a continuation of World War I, as can various other conflicts in the direct aftermath of 1918.

Scholars looking at the long term seek to explain why two rival sets of powers (the German Empire, Austria-Hungary, and the Ottoman Empire against the Russian Empire, France, and the British Empire) came into conflict by the start of 1914. They look at such factors as political, territorial and economic competition; militarism, a complex web of alliances and alignments; imperialism, the growth of nationalism; and the power vacuum created by the decline of the Ottoman Empire. Other important long-term or structural factors that are often studied include unresolved territorial disputes, the perceived breakdown of the European balance of power, convoluted and fragmented governance, arms races and security dilemmas, a cult of the offensive, and military planning.

Scholars seeking short-term analysis focus on the summer of 1914 and ask whether the conflict could have been stopped, or instead whether deeper causes made it inevitable. Among the immediate causes were the decisions made by statesmen and generals during the July Crisis, which was triggered by the assassination of Archduke Franz Ferdinand of Austria by the Bosnian Serb nationalist Gavrilo Princip, who had been supported by a nationalist organization in Serbia. The crisis escalated as the conflict between Austria-Hungary and Serbia was joined by their allies Russia, Germany, France, and ultimately Belgium and the United Kingdom. Other factors that came into play during the diplomatic crisis leading up to the war included misperceptions of intent (such as the German belief that the UK would remain neutral), the fatalistic belief that war was inevitable, and the speed with which the crisis escalated, partly due to delays and misunderstandings in diplomatic communications.

The crisis followed a series of diplomatic clashes among the Great Powers (Italy, France, Germany, Britain, Austria-Hungary and Russia) over European and colonial issues in the decades before 1914 that had left tensions high. The cause of these public clashes can be traced to changes in the balance of power in Europe that had been taking place since 1867.

Consensus on the origins of the war remains elusive, since historians disagree on key factors and place differing emphasis on a variety of factors. That is compounded by historical arguments changing over time, particularly as classified historical archives become available, and as perspectives and ideologies of historians have changed. The deepest division among historians is between those who see Germany and Austria-Hungary as having driven events and those who focus on power dynamics among a wider set of actors and circumstances. Secondary fault lines exist between those who believe that Germany deliberately planned a European war, those who believe that the war was largely unplanned but was still caused principally by Germany and Austria-Hungary taking risks, and those who believe that some or all of the other powers (Russia, France, Serbia, the UK) played a more significant role in causing the war than has been traditionally suggested.

== Immediate causes ==
=== Assassination of Archduke Franz Ferdinand by Serbian nationalists, 28 June 1914 ===
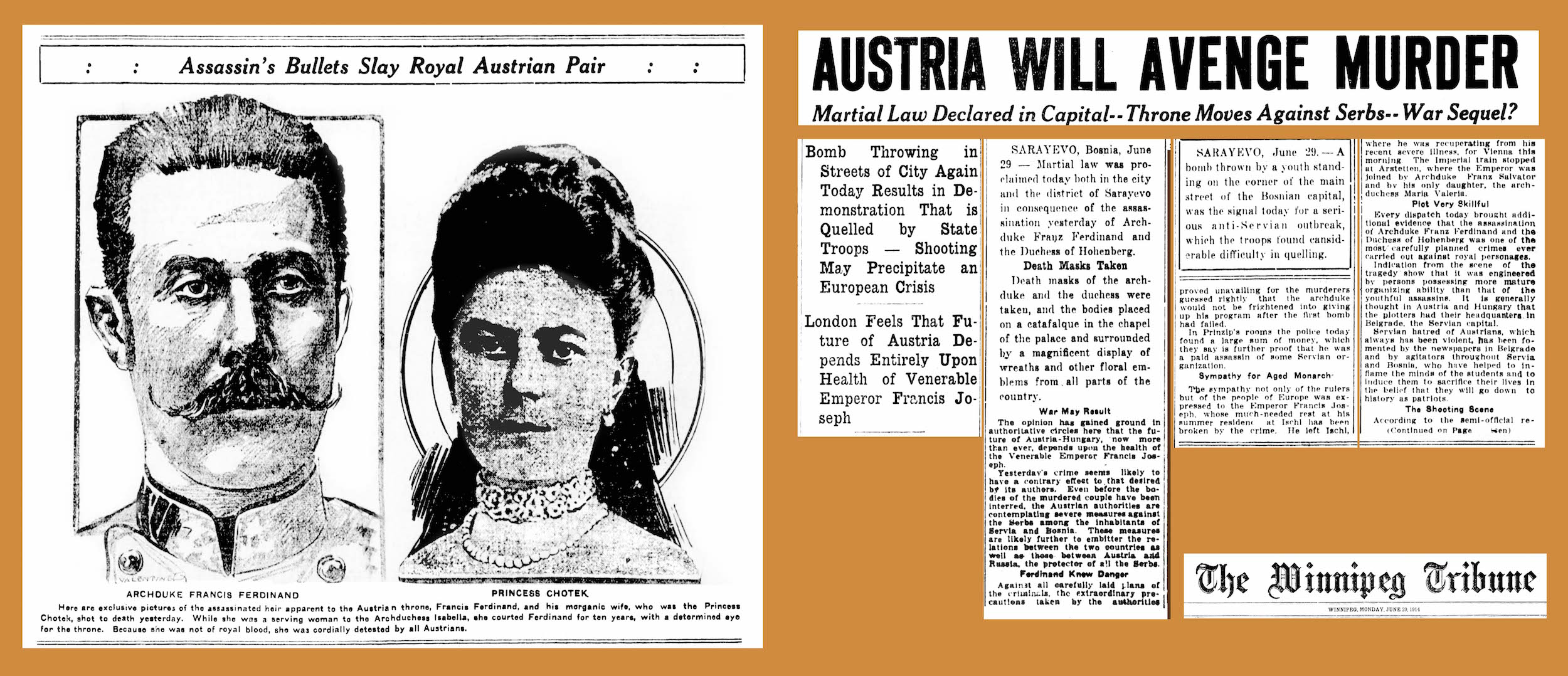
Grave implications of the assassination were immediately recognized, as in this 29 June article with subtitles "War Sequel?" and "War May Result", and stating the assassination was "engineered by persons having a more mature organizing ability than that of the youthful assassins".

On 28 June 1914, Archduke Franz Ferdinand, the heir presumptive to the Austro-Hungarian throne, and his wife, Sophie, Duchess of Hohenberg, were shot dead (after a wrong turn) in Sarajevo by Gavrilo Princip, one of a group of six assassins (five Serbs and one Bosniak) co-ordinated by Danilo Ilić, a Bosnian Serb and a member of the Black Hand secret society.

The assassination was significant because it was perceived by Austria-Hungary as an existential challenge and so was viewed as providing a casus belli with Serbia. Emperor Franz Josef was eighty-four and so the assassination of his heir, so soon before he was likely to hand over the crown, was seen as a direct challenge to the empire. Many ministers in Austria, especially Berchtold, argued that the act must be avenged.

=== July Crisis ===
Following the assassination, Austria-Hungary sought to inflict a military blow on Serbia, to demonstrate its own strength and to dampen Serbian support for Yugoslav nationalism, viewing it as a threat to the unity of its multi-national empire. However, Vienna, wary of the reaction of Russia – a major supporter of Serbia – sought a guarantee from its ally, Germany, that Berlin would support Austria in any conflict. Germany guaranteed its support through what came to be known as the "blank cheque", (Note: Some German leaders believed that growing Russian economic power would change the balance of power between the two nations, that a war was inevitable, and that Germany would be better off if a war happened soon.) but urged Austria-Hungary to attack quickly to localise the war and avoid drawing in Russia. However, Austro-Hungarian leaders would deliberate into mid-July before deciding to give Serbia a harsh ultimatum which Serbia was certain to reject, and would not attack without a full mobilisation of the army. In the meantime, France met with Russia, reaffirmed their alliance, and agreed they would support Serbia against Austria-Hungary in the event of a war.

== Polarization of Europe, 1887–1914 ==
In August 1914, The Independent magazine described the assassination of Franz Ferdinand and his wife in June as a "deplorable but relatively insignificant" reason for which

the financial system of the world is in chaos, that international commerce is suspended, that industries are everywhere demoralized and families ruined, and that millions of men in Europe have taken up arms with the intent to slaughter each other.

"It may be doubted whether the Archduke [is] worth all this carnage", the magazine added. It discussed and dismissed ethnicity, race, religion, and national interests as motivations for war. The Independent concluded that "such is the ridiculous and tragical situation resulting from the survival of the antiquated superstition of the 'balance of power,' that is, the theory that the prosperity of one nation was an injury to others":

Most of the people concerned in the present conflict have neither racial antagonism nor economic interests as an excuse for enmity. They are no more enemies than the Reds and the Blues into which an army corps is divided for practice maneuvers. But now the guns are loaded and those who bear them have nothing to say about whom they shall shoot.

"The only unexpected thing about the present European war is the date of it", the magazine added later that month:

No war in history has been so long anticipated, so carefully prepared for and so thoroughly discussed, not only in the privy councils, but in the press of all nations. Every European soldier knew where his uniform and rifle were stored; he also thought he knew as well where he was to fight, with whom he was to fight and when.

To understand the long-term origins of the war in 1914, it is essential to understand how the powers formed into two competing sets that shared common aims and enemies. Both sets became, by August 1914, Germany and Austria-Hungary on one side and Russia, France, and Britain on the other side.

=== German realignment to Austria-Hungary and Russian realignment to France, 1887–1892 ===
Map of Bismarck's alliances

1 / Dual Alliance (1879); 2 / League of the Three Emperors (1881)	3 / Triple Alliance (1882); 4 / Reinsurance Treaty (1887)

In 1887, German and Russian alignment was secured by means of a secret Reinsurance Treaty arranged by Otto von Bismarck. However, in 1890, Bismarck fell from power, and the treaty was allowed to lapse in favor of the Dual Alliance (1879) between Germany and Austria-Hungary, signed in response to rising Russian influence in the Balkans after its victory over the declining Ottoman Empire in the Russo-Turkish War of 1877-78. That development was attributed to Count Leo von Caprivi, the Prussian general who replaced Bismarck as chancellor. It is claimed that Caprivi recognized a personal inability to manage the European system as his predecessor had and so was counseled by contemporary figures such as Friedrich von Holstein to follow a more logical approach, as opposed to Bismarck's complex and even duplicitous strategy. Thus, the treaty with Austria-Hungary was concluded despite the Russian willingness to amend the Reinsurance Treaty and to sacrifice a provision referred to as the "very secret additions" that concerned the Turkish Straits.

Caprivi's decision was also driven by the belief that the Reinsurance Treaty was no longer needed to ensure Russian neutrality if France attacked Germany, and the treaty would even preclude an offensive against France. Lacking the capacity for Bismarck's strategic ambiguity, Caprivi pursued a policy that was oriented towards "getting Russia to accept Berlin's promises on good faith and to encourage St. Petersburg to engage in a direct understanding with Vienna, without a written accord." By 1882, the Dual Alliance was expanded to include Italy. In response, Russia secured in the same year the Franco-Russian Alliance, a strong military relationship that was to last until 1917. That move was prompted by Russia's need for an ally since it was experiencing a major famine and a rise in antigovernment revolutionary activities. The alliance was gradually built throughout the years from when Bismarck refused the sale of Russian bonds in Berlin, which drove Russia to the Paris capital market. That began the expansion of Russian and French financial ties, which eventually helped elevate the Franco-Russian entente to the diplomatic and military arenas.

Caprivi's strategy appeared to work when, during the outbreak of the Bosnian crisis of 1908, Germany successfully demanded that Russia step back and demobilize. When Germany asked Russia the same thing later, Russia refused, which finally helped precipitate the war.

=== French distrust of Germany ===
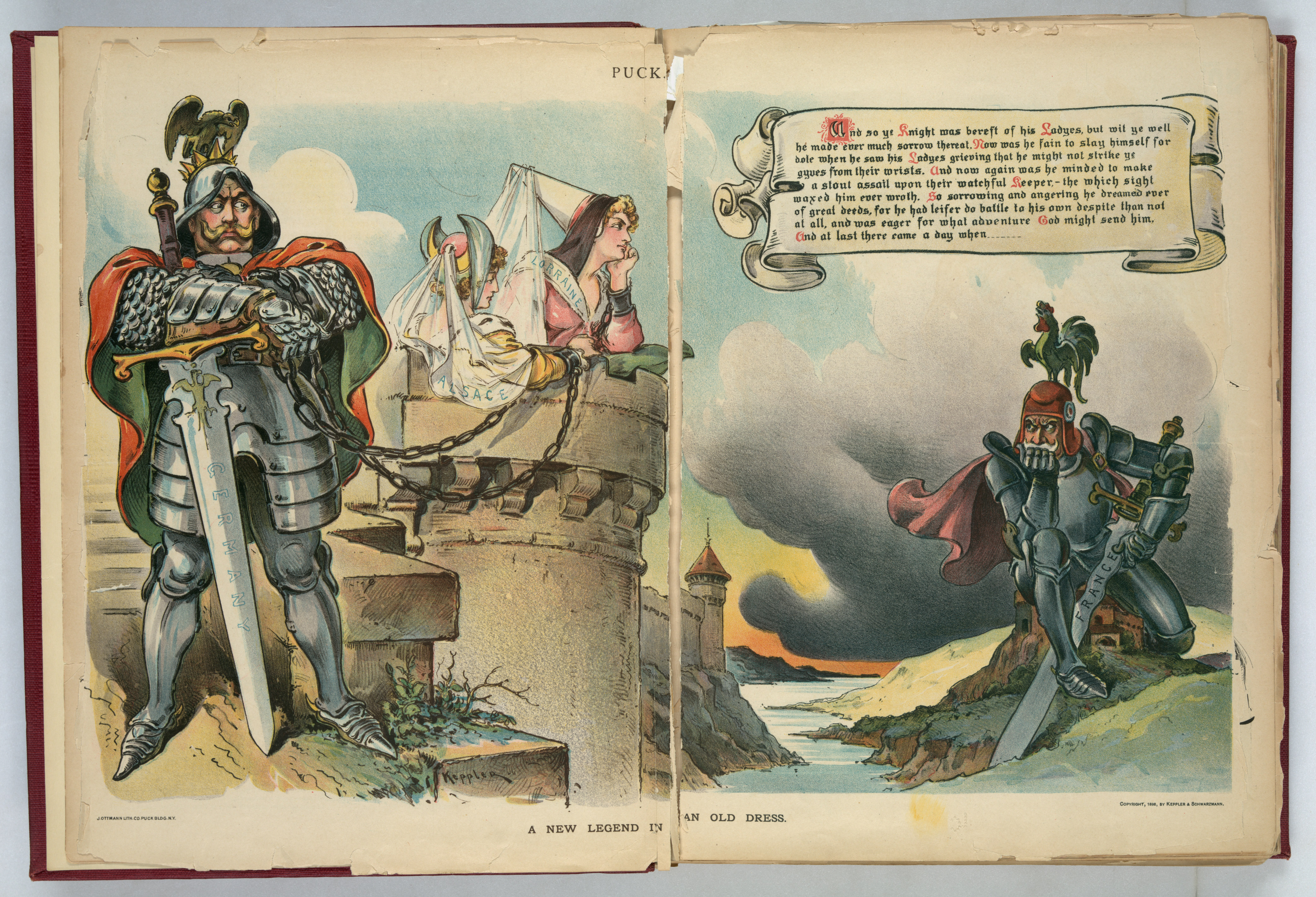
American cartoon showing territorial dispute between France and Germany over Alsace-Lorraine, 1898

Some of the distant origins of World War I can be seen in the results and consequences of the Franco-Prussian War in 1870 and 1871 and the concurrent unification of Germany. Germany had won decisively and established a powerful empire, but France fell into chaos and experienced a years-long decline in its military power. A legacy of animosity grew between France and Germany after the German annexation of Alsace-Lorraine. The annexation caused widespread resentment in France, giving rise to the desire for revenge that was known as revanchism. French sentiment was based on a desire to avenge military and territorial losses and the displacement of France as the pre-eminent continental military power. Bismarck was wary of the French desire for revenge and achieved peace by isolating France and by balancing the ambitions of Austria-Hungary and Russia in the Balkans. During his later years, he tried to placate the French by encouraging their overseas expansion. However, anti-German sentiment remained.

France eventually recovered from its defeat, paid its war indemnity, and rebuilt its military strength. However, France was smaller than Germany in terms of population and industry and therefore many French felt insecure next to a more powerful neighbor. By the 1890s, the desire for revenge over Alsace-Lorraine was no longer a major factor for the leaders of France but remained a force in public opinion. Jules Cambon, the French ambassador to Berlin (1907–1914), worked hard to secure a détente, but the French government realized that Berlin was trying to weaken the Triple Entente and at the best, was not sincere in seeking peace. The French consensus was that war was inevitable.

=== British alignment towards France and Russia, 1898–1907: The Triple Entente ===
After Bismarck's removal in 1890, French efforts to isolate Germany became successful. With the formation of the informal Triple Entente, Germany began to feel encircled. French Foreign Minister Théophile Delcassé went to great pains to woo Russia and Britain. Key markers were the 1894 Franco-Russian Alliance, the 1904 Entente Cordiale with Britain, and the 1907 Anglo-Russian Convention, which led to the Triple Entente. France's informal alignment with Britain and its formal alliance with Russia against Germany and Austria eventually led Russia and Britain to enter World War I as France's allies.

Britain abandoned its policy of splendid isolation in the 1900s, after it had been isolated during the Second Boer War. Britain concluded agreements, limited to colonial affairs, with its two major colonial rivals: the Entente Cordiale with France in 1904 and the Anglo-Russian Entente in 1907. Some historians see Britain's alignment as principally a reaction to an assertive German foreign policy and the buildup of its navy from 1898 that led to the Anglo-German naval arms race.

Other scholars, most notably Niall Ferguson, argue that Britain chose France and Russia over Germany because Germany was too weak an ally to provide an effective counterbalance to the other powers and could not provide Britain with the imperial security that was achieved by the Entente agreements. In the words of the British diplomat Arthur Nicolson, it was "far more disadvantageous to us to have an unfriendly France and Russia than an unfriendly Germany." Ferguson argues that the British government rejected German alliance overtures "not because Germany began to pose a threat to Britain, but, on the contrary because they realized she did not pose a threat." The impact of the Triple Entente was therefore twofold by improving British relations with France and its ally, Russia, and showing the importance to Britain of good relations with Germany. It was "not that antagonism toward Germany caused its isolation, but rather that the new system itself channeled and intensified hostility towards the German Empire."

The Triple Entente between Britain, France, and Russia is often compared to the Triple Alliance between Germany, Austria–Hungary and Italy, but historians caution against that comparison as simplistic. The Entente, in contrast to the Triple Alliance and the Franco-Russian Alliance, was not an alliance of mutual defence, and so in 1914 Britain felt free to make its own foreign policy decisions. As the British Foreign Office official Eyre Crowe minuted: "The fundamental fact of course is that the Entente is not an alliance. For purposes of ultimate emergencies it may be found to have no substance at all. For the Entente is nothing more than a frame of mind, a view of general policy which is shared by the governments of two countries, but which may be, or become, so vague as to lose all content."

A series of diplomatic incidents between 1905 and 1914 heightened tensions between the Great Powers and reinforced the existing alignments, beginning with the First Moroccan Crisis.

=== First Moroccan Crisis, 1905–06: Strengthening the Entente ===
The First Moroccan Crisis was an international dispute between March 1905 and May 1906 over the status of Morocco. The crisis worsened German relations with both France and Britain, and helped ensure the success of the new Entente Cordiale. In the words of the historian Christopher Clark, "The Anglo-French Entente was strengthened rather than weakened by the German challenge to France in Morocco." Due to this crisis, Spain turned to the United Kingdom and France, and signed the Pact of Cartagena of 1907. Spain received British help to build the new España-class battleship.

=== Bosnian Crisis, 1908: Worsening relations of Russia and Serbia with Austria-Hungary ===
In 1908, Austria-Hungary announced its annexation of Bosnia and Herzegovina, provinces in the Balkans. Bosnia and Herzegovina had been nominally under the sovereignty of the Ottoman Empire but administered by Austria-Hungary since the Congress of Berlin in 1878. The announcement upset the fragile balance of power in the Balkans and enraged Serbia and pan-Slavic nationalists throughout Europe. The weakened Russia was forced to submit to its humiliation, but its foreign office still viewed Austria-Hungary's actions as overly aggressive and threatening. Russia's response was to encourage pro-Russian and anti-Austrian sentiment in Serbia and other Balkan provinces, provoking Austrian fears of Slavic expansionism in the region.

=== Agadir crisis in Morocco, 1911 ===
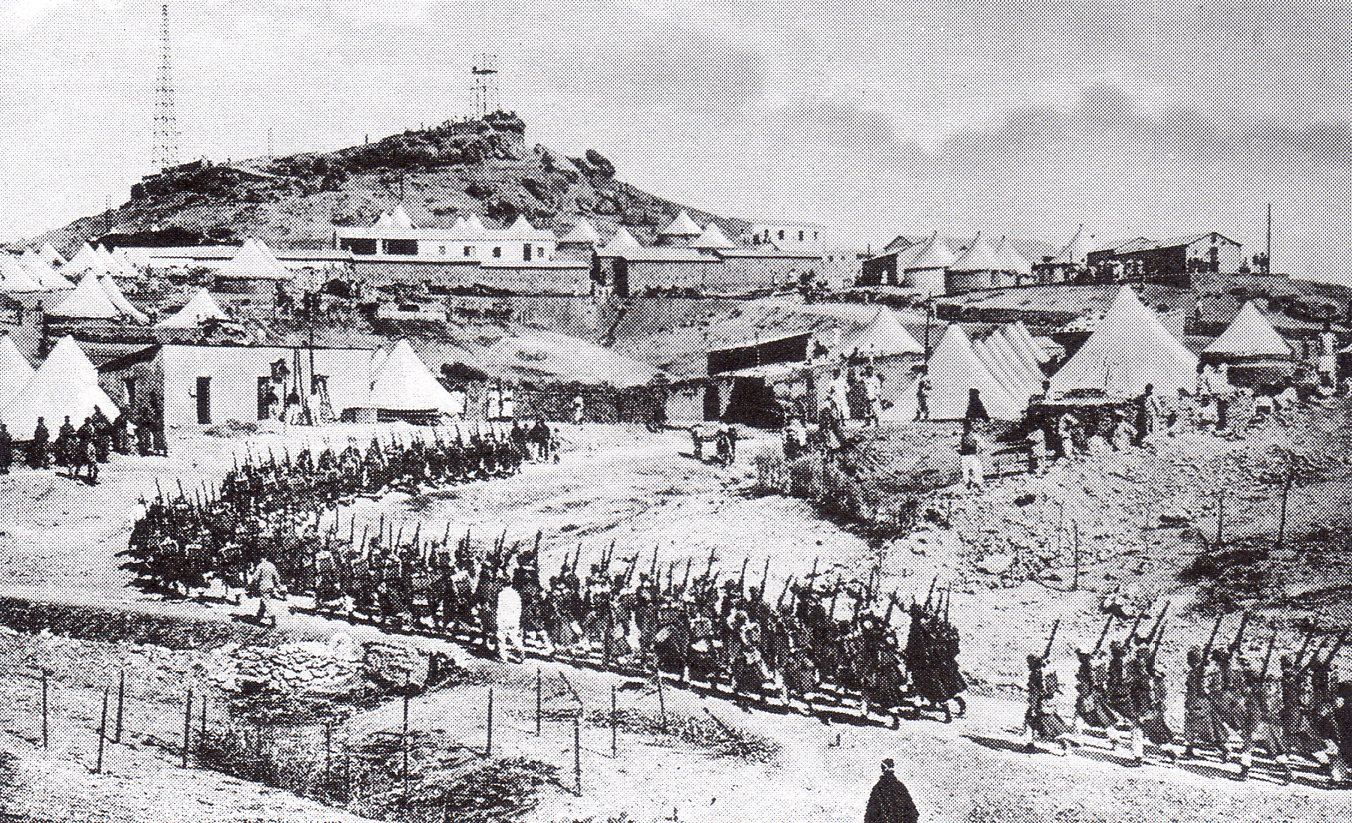
French troops in Morocco, 1912

Imperial rivalries pushed France, Germany, and Britain to compete for control of Morocco, leading to a short-lived war scare in 1911. In the end, France established a protectorate over Morocco that increased European tensions. The Agadir Crisis resulted from the deployment of a substantial force of French troops into the interior of Morocco in April 1911. Germany reacted by sending the gunboat SMS Panther to the Moroccan port of Agadir on 1 July 1911. The main result was deeper suspicion between London and Berlin and closer military ties between London and Paris.

British backing of France during the crisis reinforced the Entente between the two countries and with Russia, increased Anglo-German estrangement, and deepened the divisions that would erupt in 1914. In terms of internal British jousting, the crisis was part of a five-year struggle inside the British cabinet between Radical isolationists and the Liberal Party's imperialist interventionists. The interventionists sought to use the Triple Entente to contain German expansion. The Radical isolationists obtained an agreement for official cabinet approval of all initiatives that might lead to war. However, the interventionists were joined by the two leading Radicals, David Lloyd George and Winston Churchill. Lloyd George's famous Mansion House speech of 21 July 1911 angered the Germans and encouraged the French.

The crisis led British Foreign Secretary Edward Grey, a Liberal, and French leaders to make a secret naval agreement by which the Royal Navy would protect the northern coast of France from German attack, and France agreed to concentrate the French Navy in the western Mediterranean and to protect British interests there. France was thus able to guard its communications with its North African colonies, and Britain to concentrate more force in home waters to oppose the German High Seas Fleet. The British cabinet was not informed of the agreement until August 1914. Meanwhile, the episode strengthened the hand of German Admiral Alfred von Tirpitz, who was calling for a greatly-increased navy and obtained it in 1912.

The American historian Raymond James Sontag argues that Agadir was a comedy of errors that became a tragic prelude to the World War I:

The crisis seems comic—its obscure origin, the questions at stake, the conduct of the actors—all comic. The results were tragic. Tension between France and Germany and between Germany and England have been increased; the armaments race receive new impetus; the conviction that an early war was inevitable spread through the governing class of Europe.

=== Italo-Turkish War: Isolation of the Ottomans, 1911–1912 ===
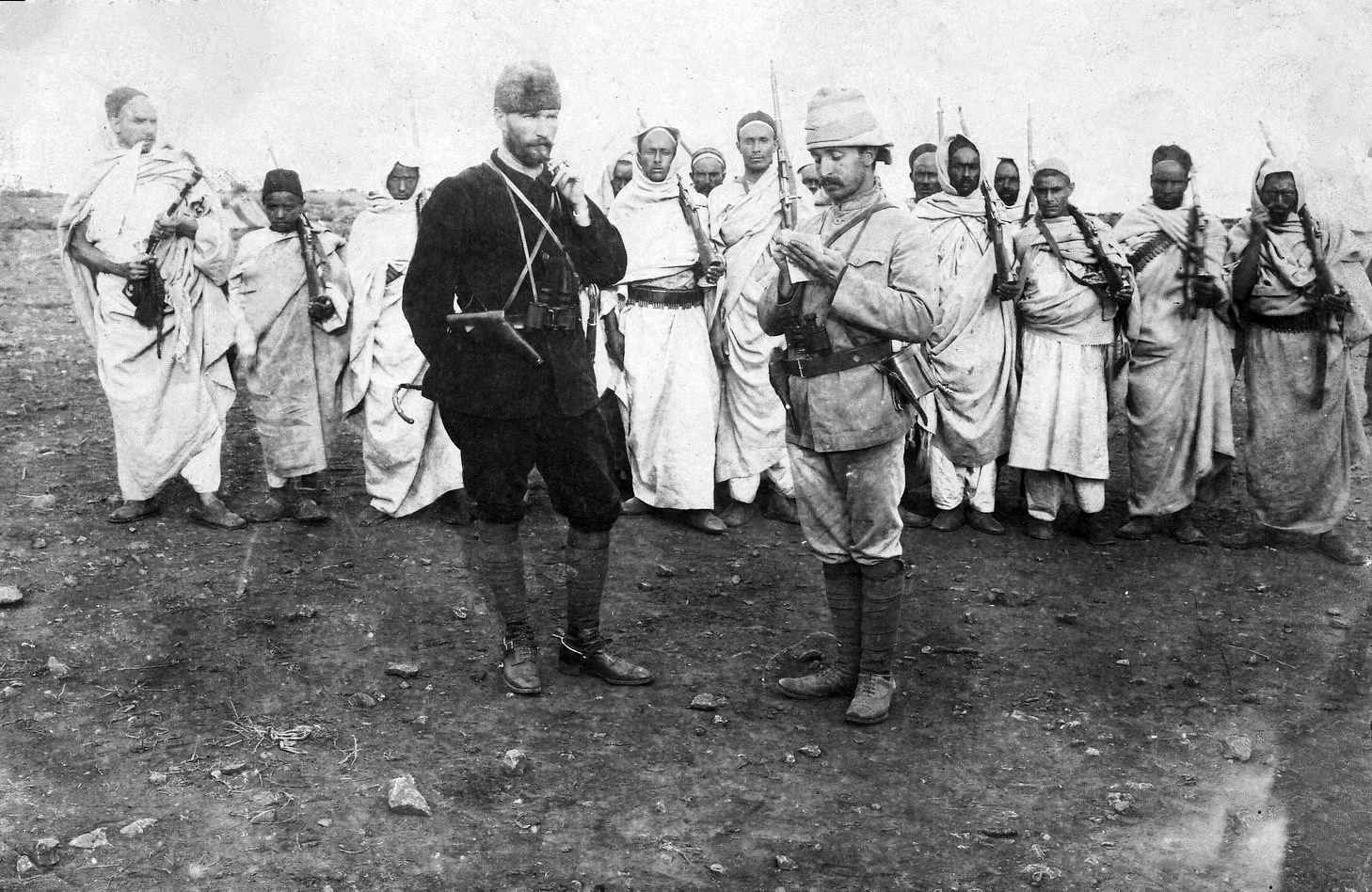
Mustafa Kemal (left) with an Ottoman military officer and Bedouin forces in Derna, Tripolitania Vilayet, 1912

In the Italo-Turkish War, the Kingdom of Italy defeated the Ottoman Empire in North Africa in 1911–1912. Italy easily captured the important coastal cities, but its army failed to advance far into the interior. Italy captured the Ottoman Tripolitania Vilayet, a province whose most notable subprovinces, or sanjaks, were Fezzan, Cyrenaica, and Tripoli itself. The territories together formed what was later known as Italian Libya. The main significance for World War I was that it was now clear that no Great Power still appeared to wish to support the Ottoman Empire, which paved the way for the Balkan Wars. Christopher Clark stated, "Italy launched a war of conquest on an African province of the Ottoman Empire, triggering a chain of opportunistic assaults on Ottoman territories across the Balkans. The system of geographical balances that had enabled local conflicts to be contained was swept away."

=== Balkan Wars, 1912–1913: Growth of Serbian and Russian power ===
The Balkan Wars were two conflicts that took place in the Balkan Peninsula in southeastern Europe in 1912 and 1913. Four Balkan states defeated the Ottoman Empire in the first war; one of them, Bulgaria, was defeated in the second war. The Ottoman Empire lost nearly all of its territory in Europe. Austria-Hungary, although not a combatant, was weakened, as a much-enlarged Kingdom of Serbia pushed for union of all South Slavs.

The Balkan Wars in 1912–1913 increased international tension between Russia and Austria-Hungary. It also led to a strengthening of Serbia and a weakening of the Ottoman Empire and Bulgaria, which might otherwise have kept Serbia under control, thus disrupting the balance of power in Europe toward Russia.

Russia initially agreed to avoid territorial changes, but later in 1912, it supported Serbia's demand for an Albanian port. The London Conference of 1912–13 agreed to create an independent Albania, but both Serbia and Montenegro refused to comply. After an Austrian and then an international naval demonstration in early 1912 and Russia's withdrawal of support, Serbia backed down. Montenegro was not as compliant, and on May 2, the Austrian council of ministers met and decided to give Montenegro a last chance to comply, or it would resort to military action. However, seeing the Austro-Hungarian military preparations, the Montenegrins requested for the ultimatum to be delayed, and they complied.

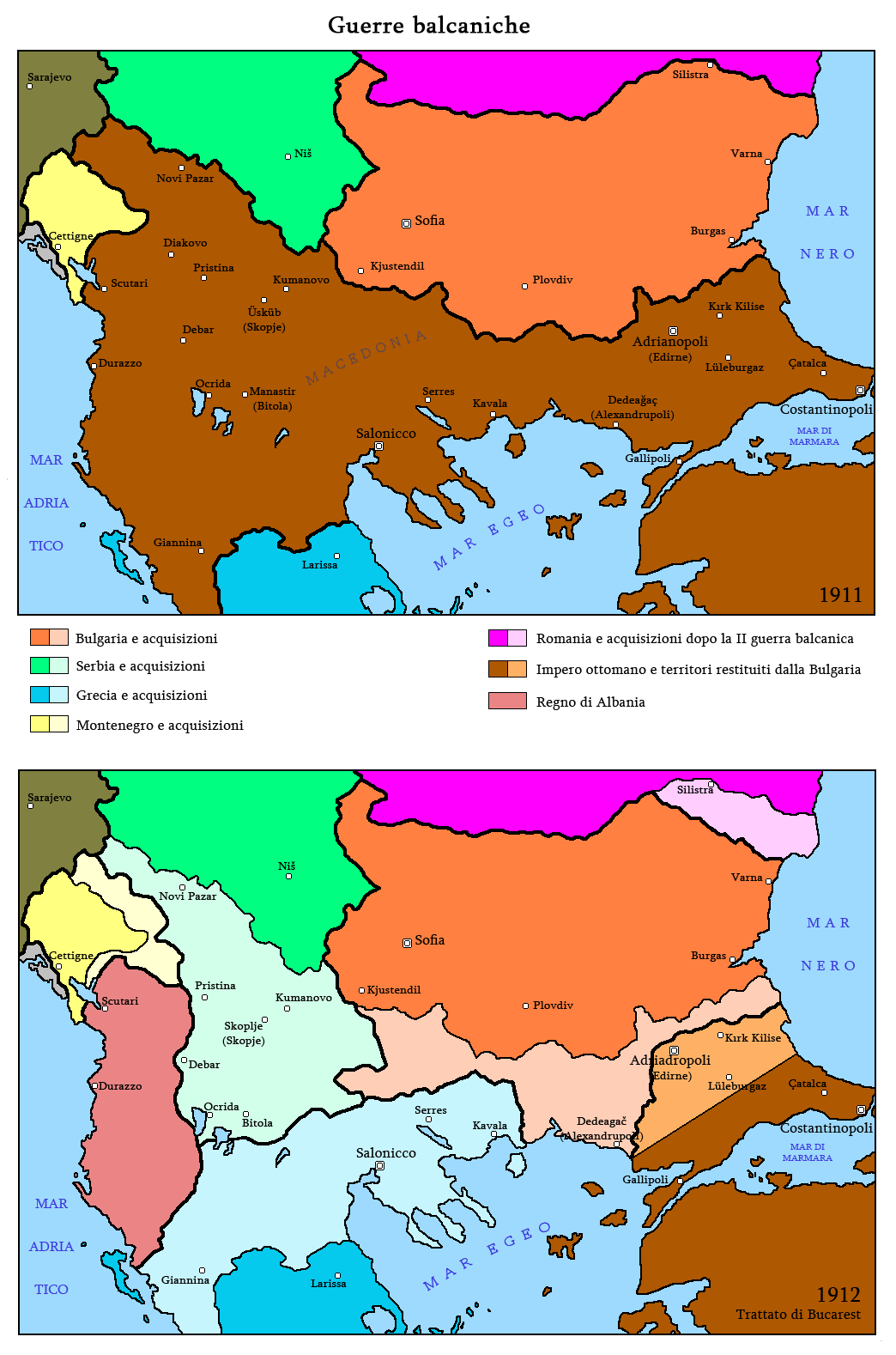
Territorial gains of the Balkan states after the Balkan Wars

The Serbian government, having failed to get Albania, now demanded for the other spoils of the First Balkan War to be reapportioned, and Russia failed to pressure Serbia to back down. Serbia and Greece allied against Bulgaria, which responded with a pre-emptive strike against their forces and so began the Second Balkan War. The Bulgarian army crumbled quickly after the Ottoman Empire and Romania joined the war.

The Balkan Wars strained the German alliance with Austria-Hungary. The attitude of the German government to Austro-Hungarian requests of support against Serbia was initially divided and inconsistent. After the German Imperial War Council of 8 December 1912, it was clear that Germany was not ready to support Austria-Hungary in a war against Serbia and its likely allies.

In addition, German diplomacy before, during, and after the Second Balkan War was pro-Greek and pro-Romanian and against Austria-Hungary's increasing pro-Bulgarian sympathies. The result was tremendous damage to relations between both empires. Austro-Hungarian Foreign Minister Leopold von Berchtold remarked to the German ambassador, Heinrich von Tschirschky in July 1913, "Austria-Hungary might as well belong 'to the other grouping' for all the good Berlin had been."

In September 1913, it was learned that Serbia was moving into Albania, and Russia was doing nothing to restrain it, and the Serbian government would not guarantee to respect Albania's territorial integrity and suggested that some frontier modifications would occur. In October 1913, the council of ministers decided to send Serbia a warning followed by an ultimatum for Germany and Italy to be notified of some action and asked for support and for spies to be sent to report if there was an actual withdrawal. Serbia responded to the warning with defiance, and the ultimatum was dispatched on October 17 and received the following day. It demanded for Serbia to evacuate from Albania within eight days. After Serbia complied, the Kaiser made a congratulatory visit to Vienna to try to fix some of the damage done earlier in the year.

By then, Russia had mostly recovered from its defeat in the Russo-Japanese War, and the calculations of Germany and Austria were driven by a fear that Russia would eventually become too strong to be challenged. The conclusion was that any war with Russia had to occur within the next few years to have any chance of success.

=== Franco-Russian Alliance changes to Balkan inception scenario, 1911–1913 ===
The original Franco-Russian alliance was formed to protect both France and Russia from a German attack. In the event of such an attack, both states would mobilize in tandem, placing Germany under the threat of a two-front war. However, there were limits placed on the alliance so that it was essentially defensive in character.

Throughout the 1890s and the 1900s, the French and the Russians made clear the limits of the alliance did not extend to provocations caused by each other's adventurous foreign policy. For example, Russia warned France that the alliance would not operate if the French provoked the Germans in North Africa. Equally, the French insisted that the Russians should not use the alliance to provoke Austria-Hungary or Germany in the Balkans and that France did not recognize in the Balkans a vital strategic interest for France or Russia.

That changed in the last 18 to 24 months before the outbreak of the war. At the end of 1911, particularly during the Balkan Wars in 1912–1913, the French view changed to accept the importance of the Balkans to Russia. Moreover, France clearly stated that if, as a result of a conflict in the Balkans, war broke out between Austria-Hungary and Serbia, France would stand by Russia. Thus, the alliance changed in character and Serbia now became a security salient for Russia and France. A war of Balkan inception, regardless of who started such a war, would cause the alliance to respond by viewing the conflict as a casus foederis, a trigger for the alliance. Christopher Clark described that change as "a very important development in the pre-war system which made the events of 1914 possible." Otte also agrees that France became significantly less keen on restraining Russia after the Austro-Serbian crisis of 1912, and sought to embolden Russia against Austria. The Russian ambassador conveyed Poincare's message as saying that "if Russia wages war, France also wages war."

=== Liman von Sanders Affair: 1913-14 ===
This was a crisis caused by the appointment of an Imperial German Army officer, Otto Liman von Sanders, to command the Ottoman First Army Corps guarding Constantinople and the subsequent Russian objections. In November, 1913, Russian Foreign Minister Sergei Sazonov complained to Berlin that the Sanders mission was an "openly hostile act." In addition to threatening Russia's foreign trade, half of which flowed through the Turkish Straits, the mission raised the possibility of a German-led Ottoman assault on Russia's Black Sea ports, and it imperiled Russian plans for expansion in eastern Anatolia. A compromise arrangement was agreed for Sanders to be appointed to the rather less senior and less influential position of Inspector General in January 1914. When the war came Sanders provided only limited help to the Ottoman forces.

=== Anglo-German détente, 1912–14 ===
Historians have cautioned that taken together, the preceding crises should not be seen as an argument that a European war was inevitable in 1914.

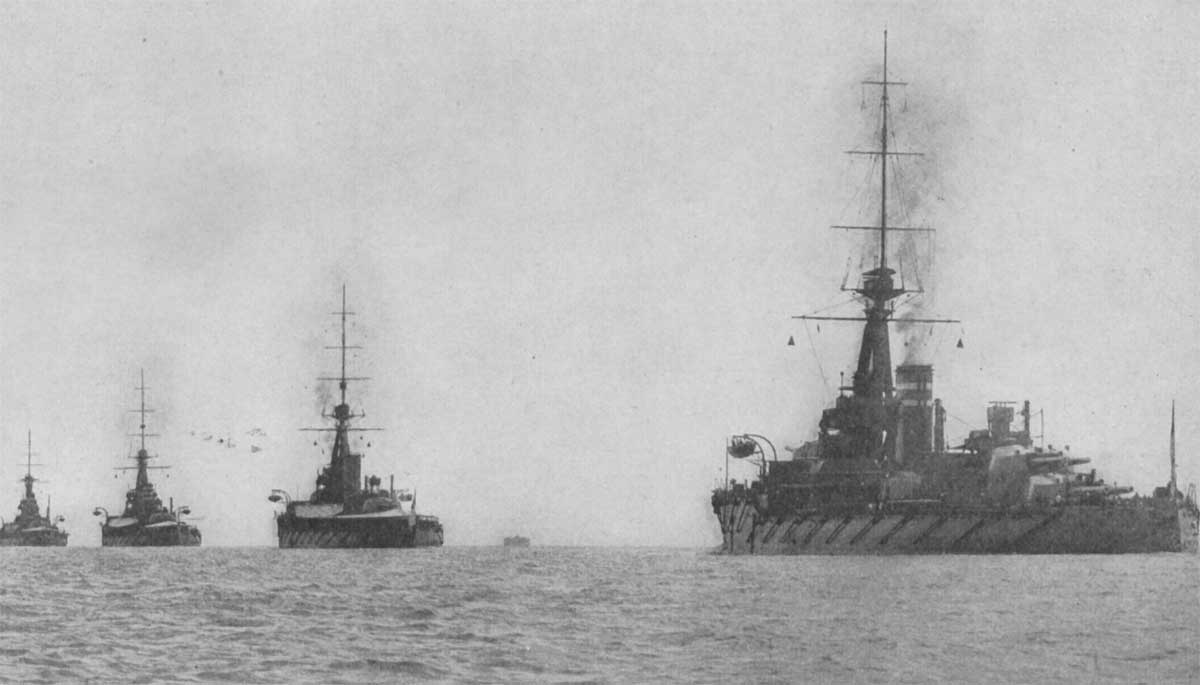
The Anglo-German naval arms race became a considerable source of tension between Germany and Britain prior to World War I. Royal Navy warships pictured above in battle formation.

Although the Haldane Mission of February 1912 failed to halt the Anglo-German naval arms race, the race suddenly paused in late 1912 as Germany cut its naval budget. In April 1913, Britain and Germany signed an agreement over the African territories of the Portuguese Empire, which was expected to collapse imminently. (That empire lasted into the 1970s.) Moreover, the Russians were again threatening British interests in Persia and India. The British were "deeply annoyed by St Petersburg's failure to observe the terms of the agreement struck in 1907 and began to feel an arrangement of some kind with Germany might serve as a useful corrective." Despite the 1908 interview in The Daily Telegraph, which implied that Kaiser Wilhelm wanted war, he came to be regarded as a guardian of peace. After the Moroccan Crisis, in the Anglo-German press wars, previously an important feature of international politics during the first decade of the century, virtually ceased. In early 1913, H. H. Asquith stated, "Public opinion in both countries seems to point to an intimate and friendly understanding." The end of the naval arms race, the relaxation of colonial rivalries, and the increased diplomatic co-operation in the Balkans all resulted in an improvement in Germany's image in Britain by the eve of the war.

The British diplomat Arthur Nicolson wrote in May 1914, "Since I have been at the Foreign Office I have not seen such calm waters." The Anglophile German Ambassador Karl Max, Prince Lichnowsky, deplored that Germany had acted hastily without waiting for the British offer of mediation in July 1914 to be given a chance.

== Domestic political factors ==
=== Drivers of Austro-Hungarian policy ===
Ethno-linguistic map of Austria-Hungary, 1910. Bosnia-Herzegovina was annexed in 1908.

Following the 1914 July Crisis, Austria-Hungary described its declaration of war on the Kingdom of Serbia as "defensive". Jack Levy and William Mulligan argued in 2021 that the death of Franz Ferdinand itself was a significant factor in helping escalate the July Crisis into a war by killing a powerful proponent for peace and thus encouraged a more belligerent decision-making process.

British historian Marvin B. Fried wrote in 2015: "Historians of the Dual Monarchy agree that, at the outbreak of the war in July 1914, few of its leaders had any specific war aims in mind beyond the military defeat and political subjugation of Serbia. However, once the Monarchy was at war with Russia and it was clear that the conflict would not be as short as originally hoped, the Austro-Hungarian leadership began to develop detailed, and ultimately very extensive, war aims which formed the subject of furious debate at the highest echelons of power."

According to German historian Fritz Fischer (1967) and Austrian historian Manfried Rauchensteiner (1993), the acquisition of Congress Poland became Vienna's principal war aim as early as autumn 1914, when Habsburg diplomats discussed the possibility of an Austro-Polish dynastic union in talks with Germany. Lothar Höbelt (2012) demonstrated that Austro-Hungarian officials had made separating Poland from the Russian Empire a clear policy goal from mid-August 1914 onward. But there were disagreements on whether to support an independent Polish state (which would however embolden nationalist separatists inside the Habsburg Empire itself), to add Poland as a third kingdom next to Austria and Hungary (which the Hungarians strongly opposed), or to unify Congress Poland and Galicia as an integral part of Cisleithania under Austrian suzerainty (the preferred option). Even before the war, Austrian politicians sought to obtain Russian Poland for two main reasons: to strengthen Cisleithania as opposed to Hungary-dominated Transleithania, and to appease the Galician Polish aristocrats who, in exchange for the privilege of dominating the Kingdom of Galicia and Lodomeria (at the expense of the Ukrainian ("Ruthenian") majority in Eastern Galicia), was deeply loyal to the Austrian dynasty. Strengthening the position of the Galician Polish aristocratic loyalists also had the added benefit of counterbalancing the Czech demands for more autonomy, and the "Austro-Polish" or "Cisleithanian" option was the only feasible Austrian territorial expansion that would not provoke the Magyars in Hungary, who opposed constitutional changes.

The argument that Austria-Hungary was a moribund political entity, whose disappearance was only a matter of time, was deployed by hostile contemporaries to suggest that its efforts to defend its integrity during the last years before the war were, in some sense, illegitimate.

Clark states, "Evaluating the prospects of the Austro-Hungarian empire on the eve of the first world war confronts us in an acute way with the problem of temporal perspective.... The collapse of the empire amid war and defeat in 1918 impressed itself upon the retrospective view of the Habsburg lands, overshadowing the scene with auguries of imminent and ineluctable decline."

It is true that Austro-Hungarian politics in the decades before the war were increasingly dominated by the struggle for national rights among the empire's eleven official nationalities: Germans, Hungarians, Czechs, Slovaks, Slovenes, Croats, Serbs, Romanians, Ruthenians (Ukrainians), Poles, and Italians. However, before 1914, radical nationalists seeking full separation from the empire were still a small minority, and Austria-Hungary's political turbulence was more noisy than deep.

In fact, in the decade before the war, the Habsburg lands passed through a phase of strong, widely-shared economic growth. Most inhabitants associated the Habsburgs with the benefits of orderly government, public education, welfare, sanitation, the rule of law, and the maintenance of a sophisticated infrastructure.

Christopher Clark states: "Prosperous and relatively well administered, the empire, like its elderly sovereign, exhibited a curious stability amid turmoil. Crises came and went without appearing to threaten the existence of the system as such. The situation was always, as the Viennese journalist Karl Kraus quipped, 'desperate but not serious'."

=== German domestic politics ===
Left-wing parties, especially the Social Democratic Party of Germany (SPD), made large gains in the 1912 German federal election. The German government was still dominated by the Prussian Junkers, who feared the rise of left-wing parties. Fritz Fischer famously argued that the Junker class deliberately sought an external war to distract the population and to whip up patriotic support for the government. Indeed, one German military leader, Moritz von Lynker, the chief of the military cabinet, wanted war in 1909 because it was "desirable in order to escape from difficulties at home and abroad." The Conservative Party leader Ernst von Heydebrand und der Lasa suggested that "a war would strengthen patriarchal order."

Other authors argue that German conservatives were ambivalent about a war for fear that losing a war would have disastrous consequences and believed that even a successful war might alienate the population if it was lengthy or difficult. Many German people complained of a need to conform to the euphoria around them, which allowed later Nazi propagandists to "foster an image of national fulfillment later destroyed by wartime betrayal and subversion culminating in the alleged Dolchstoss (stab in the back) of the army by socialists."

However, David G. Williamson believes that despite the ambivalence felt among some in the German Empire in its main land in Europe, especially certain actors in the labor movement, the spirit of 1914 was widely shared enough among all social classes to prove that the Empire was the primary cause of World War I.

=== Drivers of Italian policy ===
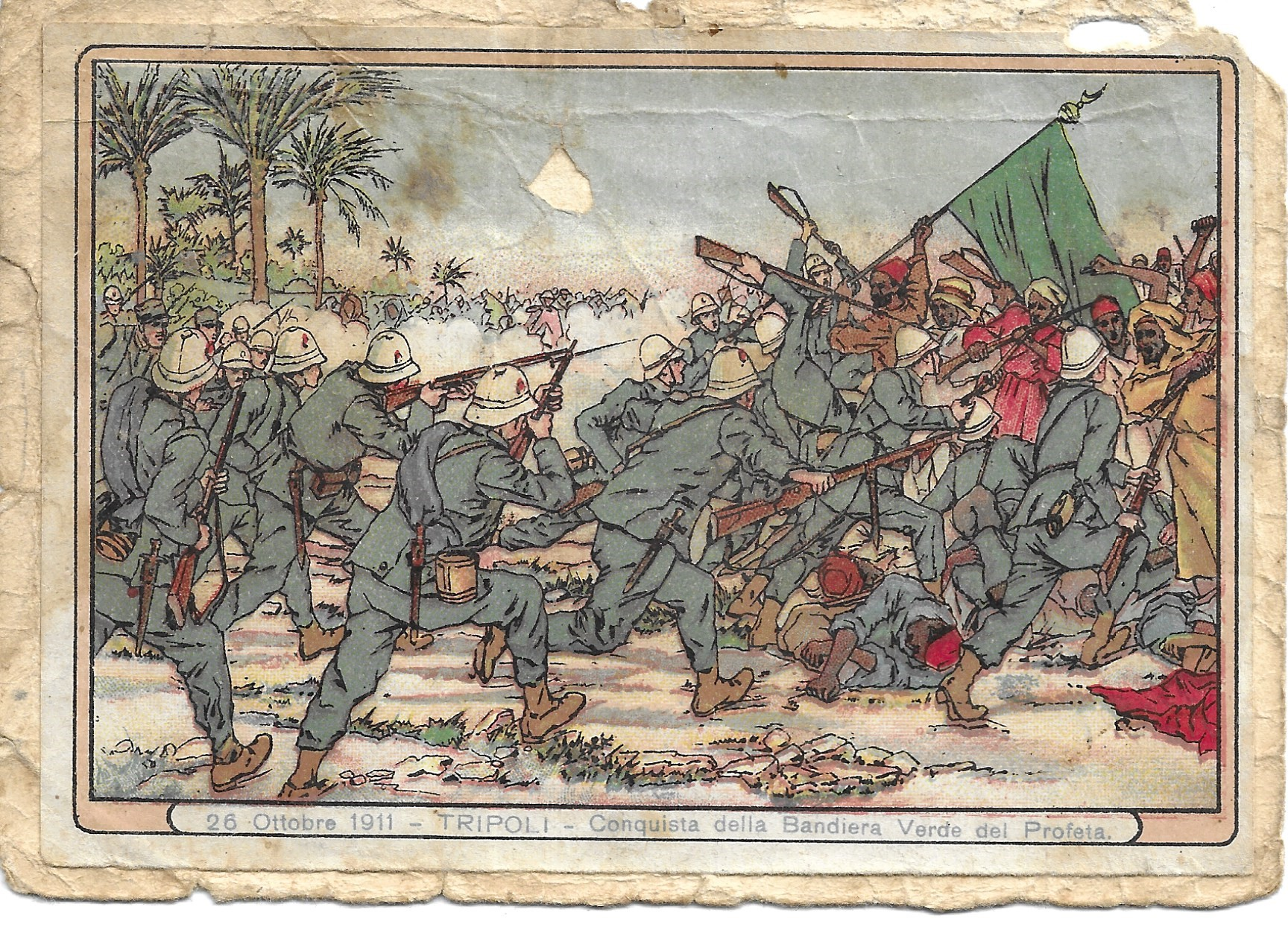
Postcard of the Italo-Turkish War (1911–1912).

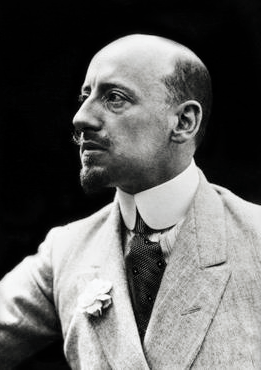
Gabriele D'Annunzio, national poet (vate) of Italy and a prominent nationalist revolutionary who was a supporter of Italy joining the action in World War I

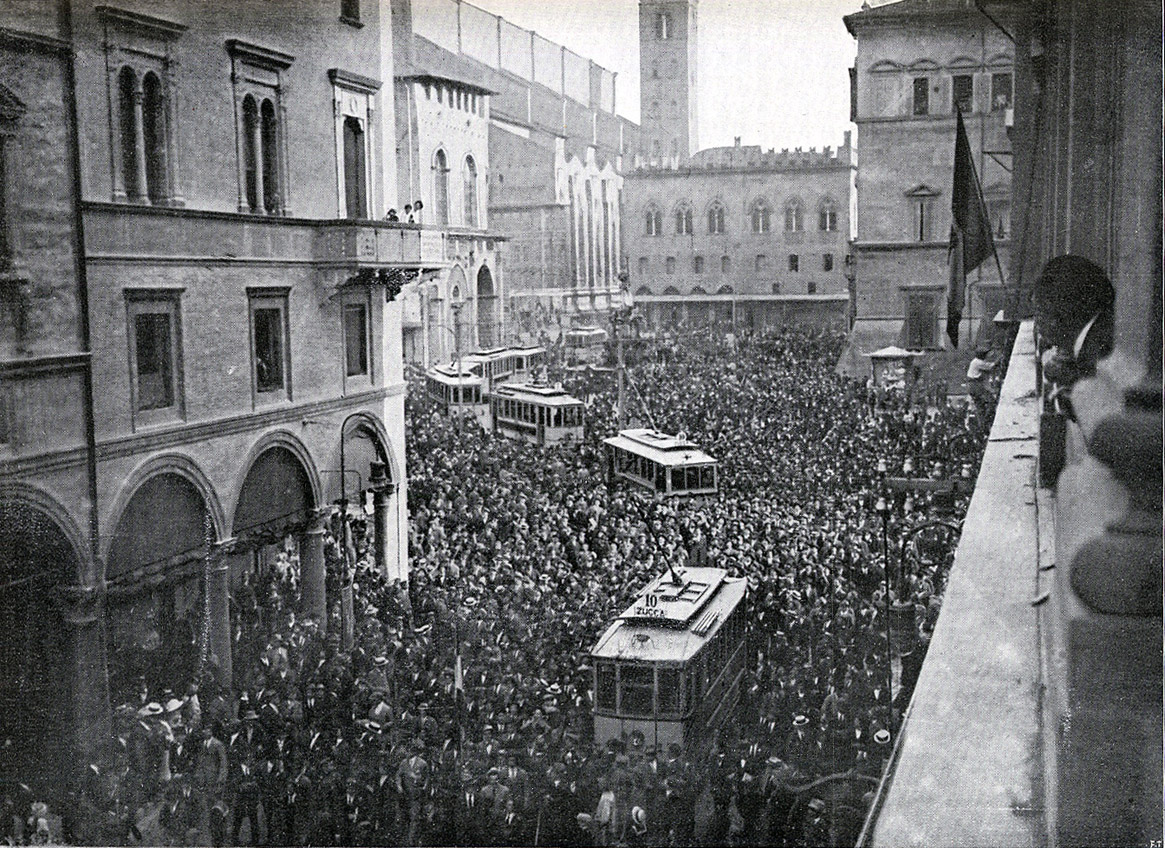
A pro-war demonstration in Bologna, 1914

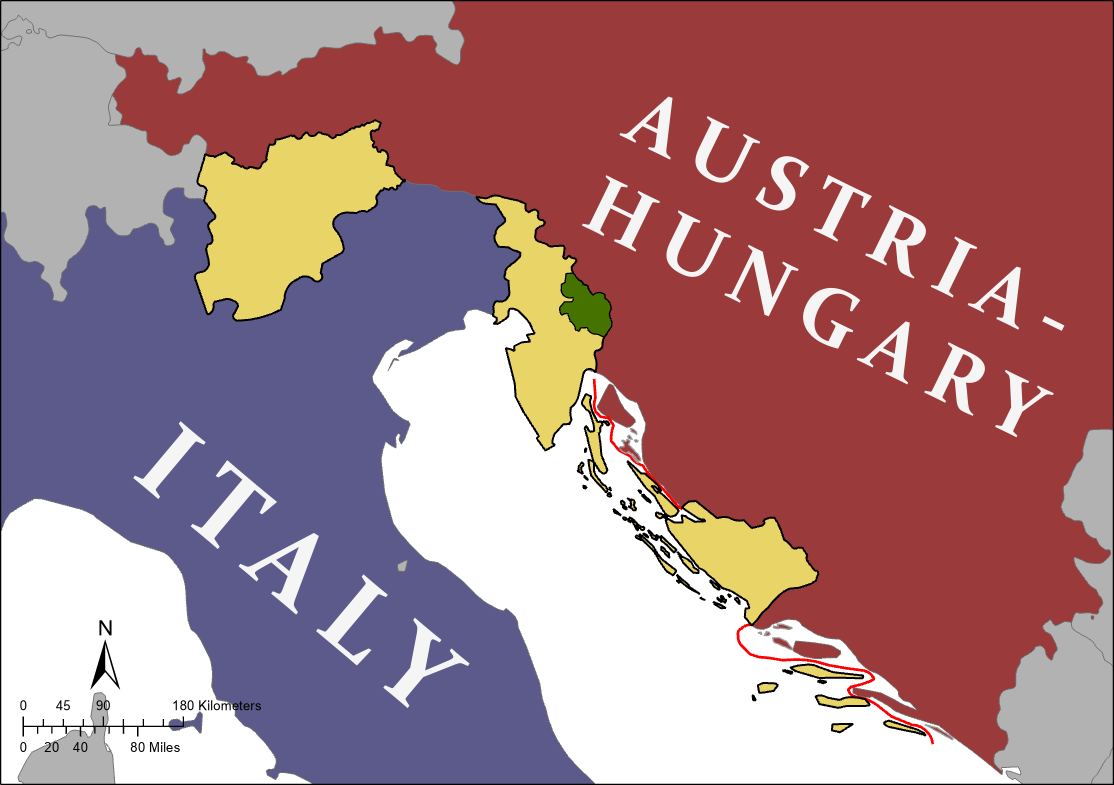
Territories promised to Italy by the Treaty of London (1915), i.e. Trentino-Alto Adige, Julian March and Dalmatia (tan), and the Snežnik Plateau area (green). Dalmatia, after World War I, however, was not assigned to Italy but to Yugoslavia.

Even after 1870, after the unification of Italy, many ethnic Italian-speakers (Italians in Trentino-Alto Adige/Südtirol, Savoyard Italians, Corfiot Italians, Niçard Italians, Swiss Italians, Corsican Italians, Maltese Italians, Istrian Italians, and Dalmatian Italians) remained outside the borders of the Kingdom of Italy, planting the seeds of Italian irredentism.

Italy entered into the World War I in 1915 with the aim of completing national unity: for this reason, the Italian intervention in the World War I is also considered the Fourth Italian War of Independence, in a historiographical perspective that identifies in the latter the conclusion of the unification of Italy, whose military actions began during the revolutions of 1848 with the First Italian War of Independence.

After the Capture of Rome (1870), almost the whole of Italy was united in a single state, the Kingdom of Italy. However, the so-called "irredent lands" were missing, that is, Italian-speaking, geographically or historically Italian lands that were not yet part of the unitary state. Among the irredent lands still belonging to Austria-Hungary were usually indicated as such: Julian March (with the city of Fiume), Trentino-Alto Adige and Dalmatia.

The Italian irredentism movement, which aimed at the reunification of the aforementioned with the motherland and therefore their consequent redemption, was active precisely between the last decades of the 19th century and the early 20th century. It was precisely in the irredentist sphere that the theme of the need for a "Fourth Italian War of Independence" against Austria-Hungary began to develop in the last decades of the 19th century, when Italy was still firmly incorporated in the Triple Alliance; also the Italo-Turkish War was seen, in the irredentist context, as part of this theme.

In Italy, society was divided over the war: Italian socialists generally opposed the war and supported pacifism, while nationalists militantly supported the war. Long-time nationalists Gabriele D'Annunzio and Luigi Federzoni, together with a former socialist journalist and new convert to nationalist sentiment, future Fascist dictator Benito Mussolini, demanded that Italy join the war. For nationalists, Italy had to maintain its alliance with the Central Powers to gain colonial territories at the expense of France. For the liberals, the war presented Italy a long-awaited opportunity to use an alliance with the Triple Entente to gain certain Italian-populated and other territories from Austria-Hungary, which had long been part of Italian patriotic aims since unification. In 1915, relatives of Italian revolutionary and republican hero Giuseppe Garibaldi died on the battlefield of France, where they had volunteered to fight. Federzoni used the memorial services to declare the importance of Italy joining the war and to warn the monarchy of the consequences of continued disunity in Italy if it did not:

Italy has awaited this since 1866 her truly a national war, to feel unified, at last, renewed by the unanimous action and identical sacrifice of all her sons. Today, while Italy still wavers before the necessity imposed by history, the name of Garibaldi, resanctified by blood, rises again to warn her that she will not be able to defeat the revolution save by fighting and winning her national war.
– Luigi Federzoni, 1915

Mussolini used his new newspaper Il Popolo d'Italia and his strong oratorical skills to urge a broad political audience – ranging from right-wing nationalists to patriotic revolutionary leftists – to support Italy's entry into the war to gain back Italian-populated territories from Austria-Hungary, by saying "enough of Libya, and on to Trento and Trieste". Although the left was traditionally opposed to war, Mussolini claimed that this time it was in their interest to join the war to tear down the aristocratic Hohenzollern dynasty of Germany which he claimed was the enemy of all European workers. Mussolini and other nationalists warned the Italian government that Italy must join the war or face revolution and called for violence against pacifists and neutralists.

With nationalist sentiment firmly on the side of reclaiming Italian territories of Austria-Hungary, Italy entered negotiations with the Triple Entente. The negotiations ended successfully in April 1915 when the London Pact was brokered with the Italian government. The pact ensured Italy the right to attain all Italian-populated lands it wanted from Austria-Hungary, as well as concessions in the Balkan Peninsula and suitable compensation for any territory gained by the United Kingdom and France from Germany in Africa. The proposal fulfilled the desires of Italian nationalists and Italian imperialism and was agreed to. Italy joined the Triple Entente in its war against Austria-Hungary.

The reaction in Italy was divided: former prime minister Giovanni Giolitti was furious over Italy's decision to go to war against its former allies, Germany and Austria-Hungary. Giolitti claimed that Italy would fail in the war, predicting high numbers of mutinies, Austro-Hungarian occupation of even more Italian territory and that the failure would produce a catastrophic rebellion that would destroy the liberal-democratic monarchy and the liberal-democratic secular institutions of the state.

Freemasonry was an influential semi-secret force in Italian politics with a strong presence among professionals and the middle class across Italy, as well as among the leadership in parliament, public administration, and the army. The two main organization were the Grand Orient and the Grand Lodge of Italy. They had 25,000 members in 500 or more lodges. Freemasons took on the challenge of mobilizing the press, public opinion, and the leading political parties in support of Italy's joining the war as an ally of France and Great Britain. In 1914-15 they temporarily dropped their traditional pacifistic rhetoric and adopted the objectives of the nationalists. Freemasonry had historically promoted cosmopolitan universal values, and by 1917 onwards they reverted to their internationalist stance and pressed for the creation of a League of Nations to promote a new post-war universal order based upon the peaceful coexistence of independent and democratic nations.

=== Drivers of Serbian policy ===
The principal aims of Serbian policy were to consolidate the Russian-backed expansion of Serbia in the Balkan Wars and to achieve dreams of a Greater Serbia, which included the unification of lands with large ethnic Serb populations in Austria-Hungary, including Bosnia. One important factor was the idea that Serbia was to be the "Piedmont of the Balkans", the core land that would unite all South Slavs into a single state, just like Piedmont–Sardinia had done during the Italian Risorgimento. However, the unexpected emergence of an independent Principality of Bulgaria in 1878 challenged Serbia's monopoly on Yugoslavism, and a fierce regional competition with the Bulgarians began. Serbian–Bulgarian rivalry between 1878 and 1914 caused several wars between what were ironically supposedly South Slavic "brethren". After Bulgaria incorporated Eastern Rumelia in 1885, king Milan I of Serbia feared that Bulgaria would annex Macedonia, and decided to wage the Serbo-Bulgarian War (1885) to prevent it, although the Serbs suffered a great defeat. Inside Serbia, there was a strong sense of a loss of opportunity in the southeastern Balkans, and there were fears that Belgrade might forever lose its chances of uniting the Western Balkans as well, as Austria-Hungary already incorporated the later territories of Slovenia and Croatia, first occupied Bosnia and Herzegovina in 1878, and then annexed them as a crown land in 1908.

Underlying that was a culture of extreme nationalism and a cult of assassination, which romanticized the slaying of the Ottoman Sultan Murad I as the heroic epilogue to the otherwise-disastrous Battle of Kosovo on 28 June 1389. Clark states: "The Greater Serbian vision was not just a question of government policy, however, or even of propaganda. It was woven deeply into the culture and identity of the Serbs."Famed Serbian-American scientist Michael Pupin, for example, in July 1914 explicitly connected the Battle of Kosovo ("a natural heritage of every true Serb") to Franz Ferdinand's assassination. He wrote that the battle's "memory always served as a reminder to the Serbs that they must avenge the wrongs perpetrated upon their race".

Serbian policy was complicated by the fact that the main actors in 1914 were both the official Serb government, led by Nikola Pašić, and the "Black Hand" terrorists, led by the head of Serb military intelligence, known as Apis. The Black Hand believed that a Greater Serbia would be achieved by provoking a war with Austria-Hungary by an act of terror. The war would be won with Russian backing.

The official government position was to focus on consolidating the gains made during the exhausting Balkan War and to avoid further conflicts. That official policy was temporized by the political necessity of simultaneously and clandestinely supporting dreams of a Greater Serbian state in the long term. The Serbian government found it impossible to put an end to the machinations of the Black Hand for fear it would itself be overthrown. Clark states: "Serbian authorities were partly unwilling and partly unable to suppress the irredentist activity that had given rise to the assassinations in the first place".

Russia tended to support Serbia as a fellow Slavic state, considered Serbia its "client", and encouraged Serbia to focus its irredentism against Austria-Hungary because it would discourage conflict between Serbia and Bulgaria, another prospective Russian ally, in Macedonia.

== Imperialism ==
=== Global closure ===
The global space for imperial expansion ended c. 1900. All contemporary empires reached their last frontier. Later, the event was called "global closure".

Writing in the late 19th century, Kang Youwei, Josiah Strong and George Vacher de Lapouge stressed that imperial expansion cannot indefinitely proceed on the definite earth surface and therefore empires are destined to clash for world domination. The more nations become conscious of global spatial relations, wrote another contemporary Friedrich Ratzel, the more they engage in the struggle for space, and "in a narrow space the struggle becomes desperate."

After the world wars, many scholars offered similar explanations. Edward Carr causally linked the end of the overseas outlet for imperial expansion and the wars. In the 19th century, he wrote during the Second World War, imperialist wars were waged against "primitive" peoples. "It was silly for European countries to fight against one another when they could still ... maintain social cohesion by continuous expansion in Asia and Africa. Since 1900, however, this has no longer been possible: "the situation has radically changed". Now wars are between "imperial powers". The Anatomy of Peace (1945) of Emery Reves argued expansion is forever closed and the historic trend of expansion resulted in direct collision between the remaining powers. In another 1945 book, The Precarious Balance, on centuries of the European power struggle, Ludwig Dehio explained the durability of the European states system by its overseas expansion: "Overseas expansion and the system of states were born at the same time; the vitality that burst the bounds of the Western world also destroyed its unity." In a similar thesis, the overseas world provided European empires with an enormous outlet and thus prevented Europe from unifying into a single European empire. The European powers turned their exceeding energies outward and the internal European power was balanced. Correspondingly, when the space for expansion ended, these powers became destined for head-on collisions. Hans Morgenthau wrote that the imperial expansion into relatively empty periphery in the 18th and 19th centuries deflected great power politics, thereby reducing conflict. But by the late 19th century, the consolidation of Western empires was consummated, and territorial gains could only be made at the expense of one another. John H. Herz outlined one "chief function" of the overseas expansion and the impact of its end:

[A] European balance of power could be maintained or adjusted because it was relatively easy to divert European conflicts into overseas directions and adjust them there. Thus the openness of the world contributed to the consolidation of the territorial system. The end of the 'world frontier' and the resulting closedness of an interdependent world inevitably affected the system's effectiveness.

Michael Heffernan summarized the view:

For some commentators, the passing of the 19th century seemed destined to mark the end of this long era of European empire building. The unexplored and unclaimed "blank" spaces on the world map were rapidly diminishing ... and the sense of "global closure" prompted an anxious fin-de-siècle debate about the future of the great empires ... The "closure" of the global imperial system implied ... the beginning of a new era of intensifying inter-imperial struggle along borders that now straddled the globe.

The prevalence of historical forces over human agency is reflected in memoirs of those who waged World War I. Nations, Churchill associated, acted as "planetary bodies" drawing "each other into due collision" with diplomacy helpless to prevent Cosmos from plunging into Chaos. With their nations slithering "over the brink into the boiling cauldron of war," in the words of David Lloyd George, statesmen felt "standing on a planet that had been suddenly wrenched from its orbit and was spinning wildly into the unknown." Lloyd George described the waiting on August 4, 1914 for the hour of the ultimatum to Germany as "Britain's most fateful hour since she arose out of the deep." "Boom!" was Big Ben's signal to "hurl millions to their doom." The big clock echoed like the "hummer of destiny": "Doom! Doom! Doom!"

=== Impact of colonial rivalry and aggression on the pre-1914 Europe ===
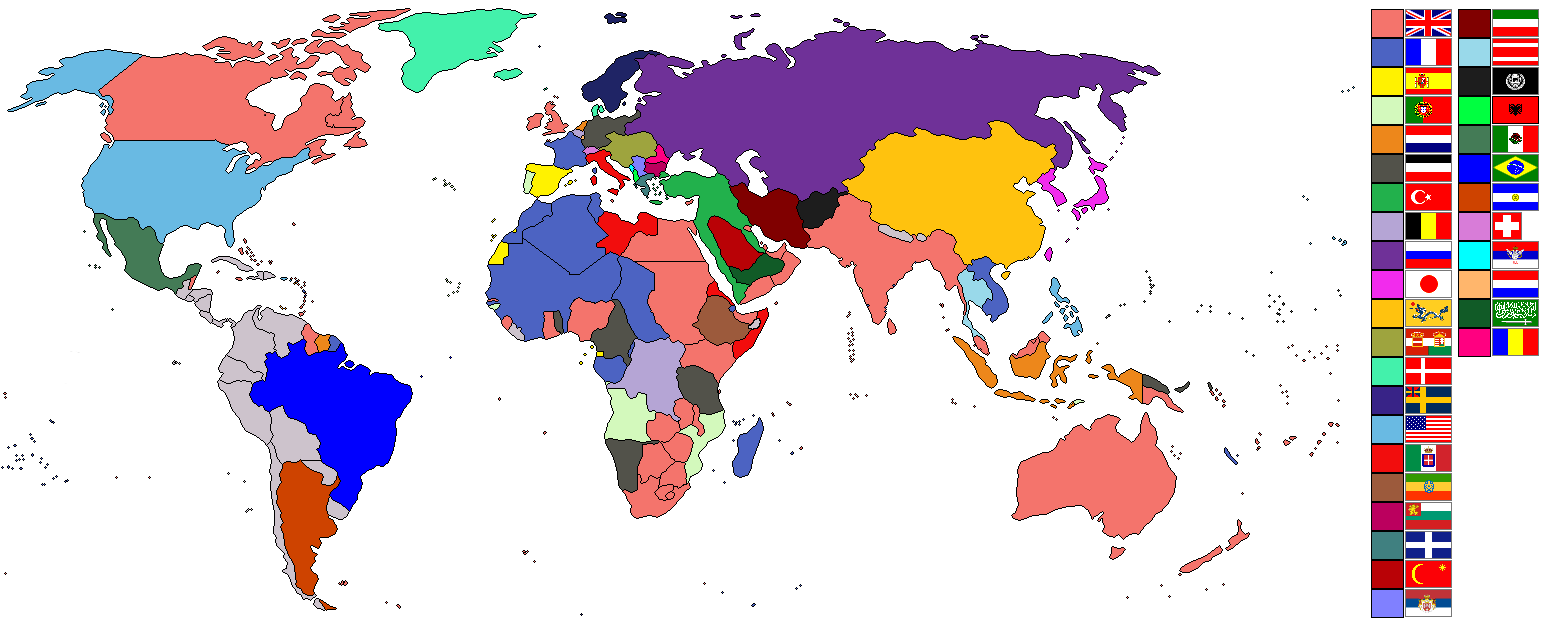
World empires and colonies around 1914

Imperial rivalry and the consequences of the search for imperial security or for imperial expansion had important consequences for the origins of World War I. In view of Richard Overy, the origins of both World Wars can only be understood through the prism of the fresh drive to empire since the 1870s.

Imperial rivalries among France, Britain, Russia and Germany played an important part in the creation of the Triple Entente and the relative isolation of Germany. Imperial opportunism, in the form of the Italian attack on Ottoman Libyan provinces, also encouraged the Balkan wars of 1912–13, which changed the balance of power in the Balkans to the detriment of Austria-Hungary.

Some historians, such as Margaret MacMillan, believe that Germany created its own diplomatic isolation in Europe, in part by an aggressive and pointless imperial policy known as Weltpolitik. Others, such as Clark, believe that German isolation was the unintended consequence of a détente among Britain, France, and Russia. The détente was driven by Britain's desire for imperial security in relation to France in North Africa and to Russia in Persia and India.

Either way, the isolation was important because it left Germany few options but to ally itself more strongly with Austria-Hungary, leading ultimately to unconditional support for Austria-Hungary's punitive war on Serbia during the July Crisis.

=== German isolation ===
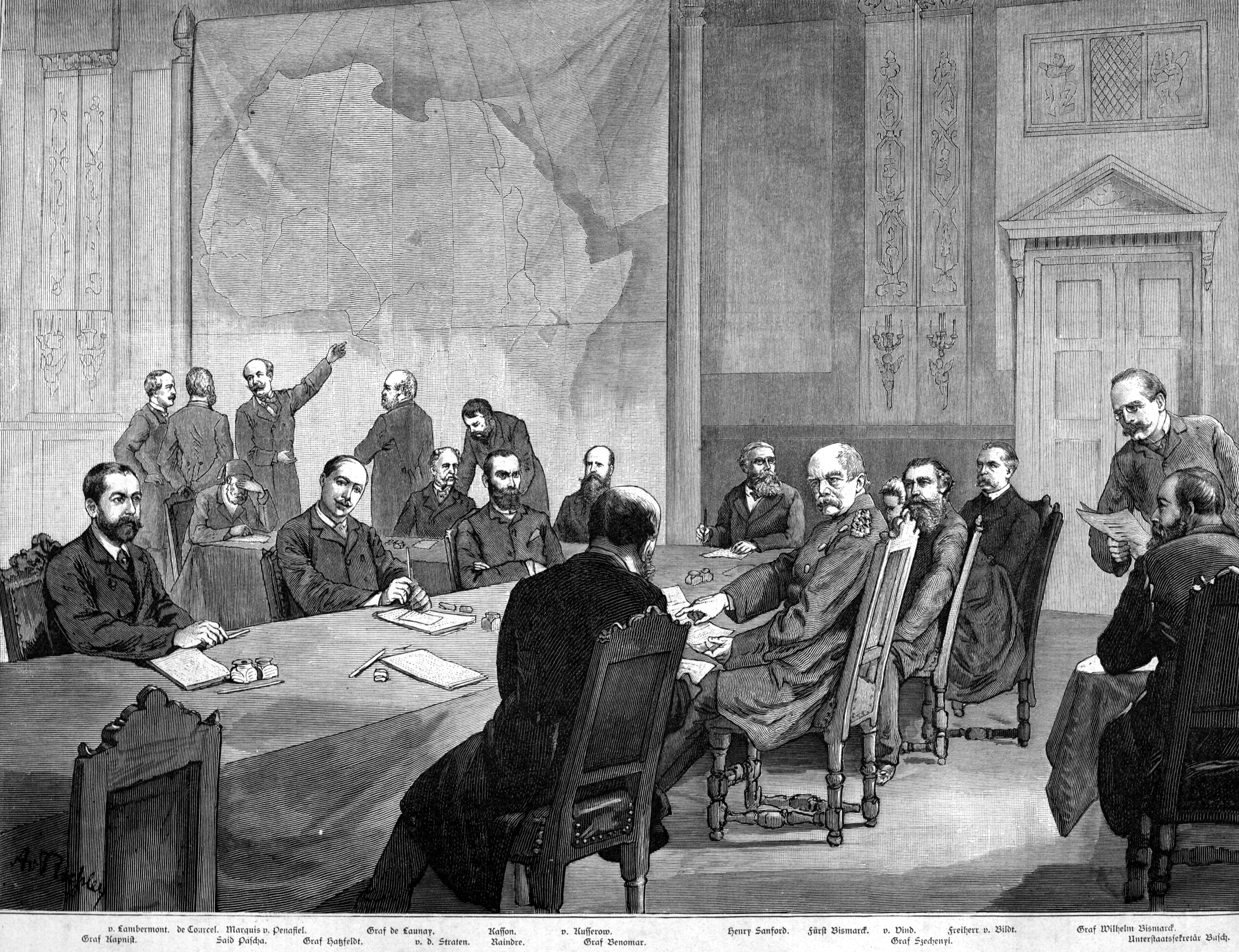
European officials staking claims to Africa in the Berlin Conference, 1884

Otto von Bismarck disliked the idea of an overseas empire, but supported France's colonization in Africa because it diverted the French away from Continental Europe and revanchism after 1870. Germany's "New Course" in foreign affairs, Weltpolitik ("world policy"), was adopted in the 1890s after Bismarck's dismissal. Its aim was ostensibly to transform Germany into a global power through assertive diplomacy, the acquisition of overseas colonies, and the development of a large navy. Some historians, notably MacMillan and Hew Strachan, believe that a consequence of Weltpolitik and Germany's associated assertiveness was to isolate it. Weltpolitik, particularly as expressed in Germany's objections to France's growing influence in Morocco in 1904 and 1907, also helped cement the Triple Entente. The Anglo-German naval race isolated Germany by reinforcing Britain's preference for agreements with Germany's continental rivals: France and Russia.

Historians like Ferguson and Clark believe Germany's isolation was the unintended consequences of the need for Britain to defend its empire against threats from France and Russia. They downplay the impact of Weltpolitik and the Anglo-German naval race, which ended in 1911. Britain and France signed agreements in 1904, known as the Entente Cordiale. Most importantly, it granted freedom of action to Britain in Egypt and France in Morocco. Equally, the 1907 Anglo-Russian Convention improved British–Russian relations by solidifying boundaries that identified respective control in Persia, Afghanistan, and Tibet.

The alignment between Britain, France, and Russia became known as the Triple Entente. However, the Triple Entente was not conceived as a counterweight to the Triple Alliance, but as a formula to secure imperial security among the three powers. The impact of the Entente was twofold: improving British relations with France and its ally, Russia, and showing the importance to Britain of good relations with Germany. Clark states it was "not that antagonism toward Germany caused its isolation, but rather that the new system itself channeled and intensified hostility towards the German Empire."

=== Imperial opportunism ===
The construction of the Berlin–Baghdad railway was a contributing factor to the outbreak of war. Germany had sought to connect its capital to Baghdad and the Persian Gulf to facilitate economic and military access to the region and the rest of its colonial empire, bypassing the British-controlled Suez Canal and challenged British and Russian interests and influence in the Middle East and Persia.

The Italo-Turkish War of 1911–1912 was fought between the Ottoman Empire and the Kingdom of Italy in North Africa. The war made it clear that no great power still appeared to wish to support the Ottoman Empire, which paved the way for the Balkan Wars.

The status of Morocco had been guaranteed by international agreement, and when France attempted a great expansion of its influence there without the assent of all other signatories, Germany opposed and prompted the Moroccan Crises: the Tangier Crisis of 1905 and the Agadir Crisis of 1911. The intent of German policy was to drive a wedge between the British and French, but in both cases, it produced the opposite effect and Germany was isolated diplomatically, most notably by lacking the support of Italy despite it being in the Triple Alliance. The French protectorate over Morocco was established officially in 1912.

In 1914, however, the African scene was peaceful. The continent was almost fully divided up by the imperial powers, with only Liberia and Ethiopia still independent. There were no major disputes there pitting any two European powers against each other.

=== Role of businesses and financial institutions ===
==== Lenin's interpretation ====
Marxism attributes war to economic interests and rivalries, in this case, imperialism. Vladimir Lenin argued that "imperialism is the monopoly stage of capitalism," which emerges from the "free competition" stage of capitalism and is characterized by the presence of "five basic features":

"(1) the concentration of production and capital has developed to such a high stage that it has created monopolies which play a decisive role in economic life; (2) the merging of bank capital with industrial capital, and the creation, on the basis of this 'finance capital,' of a financial oligarchy; (3) the export of capital as distinguished from the export of commodities acquires exceptional importance; (4) the formation of international monopolist capitalist associations which share the world among themselves and (5) the territorial division of the whole world among the biggest capitalist powers is completed."

Lenin concluded that these five features of imperialism had been established by the turn of the 20th century, after the great powers had spent the final decades of the prior century acquiring nearly all the remaining territory of the world that had not yet been colonized. The largest and most lucrative uncolonized or semi-colonized territories at the time of the war were that of Persia (Iran), Turkey (including all of the pre-industrial territories of the declining Ottoman Empire), and most of China beyond the treaty ports. Having completed the division of the world among themselves at the beginning of the century, the developed capitalist states would thereafter compete for hegemony in the form of a redivision of those territories, both in the industrialized areas (e.g., "German appetite for Belgium; French appetite for Lorraine"), and in primarily agrarian areas.

==== Other views ====
The United Kingdom's pound sterling was the primary reserve currency of much of the world in the 19th century and the first half of the 20th century. The United Kingdom was the primary exporter of manufactured goods and services, and over 60% of world trade was invoiced in pounds sterling. British banks were also expanding overseas; London was the world centre for insurance and commodity markets and British capital was the leading source of foreign investment around the world; sterling soon became the standard currency used for international commercial transactions.

Richard Hamilton observed that the argument went that since industrialists and bankers were seeking raw materials, new markets and new investments overseas, if one was strategically blocked by other powers, the "obvious" or "necessary" solution was war. Hamilton somewhat criticized the view that the war was launched to secure colonies, but agreed that imperialism may have been on the mind of key decision makers. He argued that it was not necessarily for logical, economic reasons. Hamilton noted that Bismarck was famously not moved by such peer pressure and ended Germany's limited imperialist movement. He regarded colonial ambitions as a waste of money but simultaneously recommended them to other nations.

While some bankers and industrialists tried to curb Wilhelm II away from war, their efforts ended in failure. There is no evidence they ever received a direct response from the Kaiser, chancellor, or foreign secretary or that their advice was discussed in depth by the Foreign Office or the General Staff. The German leadership measured power not in financial ledgers but land and military might.

Hamilton argued that, generally speaking, the European business leaders were in favour of profits and peace allowed for stability and investment opportunities across national borders, but war brought the disruption of trade, the confiscation of holdings, and the risk of increased taxation. While arms manufacturers could make money selling weapons at home, they could also lose access to foreign markets. Krupp, a major arms manufacturer, started the war with 48 million marks in profits but ended it 148 million marks in debt, and the first year of peace saw further losses of 36 million marks.

William Mulligan argues that while economic and political factors were often interdependent, economic factors tended towards peace. Prewar trade wars and financial rivalries never threatened to escalate into conflict. Governments would mobilise bankers and financiers to serve their interests, rather than the reverse. The commercial and financial elite recognized peace as necessary for economic development and used its influence to resolve diplomatic crises. Economic rivalries existed but were framed largely by political concerns. Prior to the war, there were few signs that the international economy stood for war in the summer of 1914.

== Social Darwinism ==
Social Darwinism was a theory of human evolution loosely based on Darwinism that influenced many European intellectuals and strategic thinkers from 1870 to 1914. It emphasised that struggle between nations and races was natural and that only the fittest nations deserved to survive. It gave an impetus to German assertiveness as a world economic and military power, aimed at competing with France and Britain for world power. German colonial rule in Africa from 1884 to 1914 was an expression of nationalism and moral superiority, which was justified by constructing an image of the natives as "Other". The approach highlighted racist views of mankind. German colonization was characterized by the use of repressive violence in the name of "culture" and "civilisation". Germany's cultural-missionary project boasted that its colonial programmes were humanitarian and educational endeavours. Furthermore, the wide acceptance of Social Darwinism by intellectuals justified Germany's right to acquire colonial territories as a matter of the "survival of the fittest", according to the historian Michael Schubert.

The model suggested an explanation of why some ethnic groups, then called "races", had been for so long antagonistic, such as Germans and Slavs. They were natural rivals, destined to clash. Senior German generals like Helmuth von Moltke the Younger talked in apocalyptic terms about the need for Germans to fight for their existence as a people and culture. MacMillan states: "Reflecting the Social Darwinist theories of the era, many Germans saw Slavs, especially Russia, as the natural opponent of the Teutonic races." Also, the chief of the Austro-Hungarian General Staff declared: "A people that lays down its weapons seals its fate." In July 1914, the Austrian press described Serbia and the South Slavs in terms that owed much to Social Darwinism. In 1914, the German economist Johann Plenge described the war as a clash between the German "ideas of 1914" (duty, order, justice) and the French "ideas of 1789" (liberty, equality, fraternity). William Mulligen argues that Anglo-German antagonism was also about a clash of two political cultures as well as more traditional geopolitical and military concerns. Britain admired Germany for its economic successes and social welfare provision but also regarded Germany as illiberal, militaristic, and technocratic.

War was seen as a natural and viable or even useful instrument of policy. "War was compared to a tonic for a sick patient or a life-saving operation to cut out diseased flesh." Since war was natural for some leaders, it was simply a question of timing and so it would be better to have a war when the circumstances were most propitious. "I consider a war inevitable," declared Moltke in 1912. "The sooner the better." In German ruling circles, war was viewed as the only way to rejuvenate Germany. Russia was viewed as growing stronger every day, and it was believed that Germany had to strike while it still could before it was crushed by Russia.

Nationalism made war a competition between peoples, nations or races, rather than kings and elites. Social Darwinism carried a sense of inevitability to conflict and downplayed the use of diplomacy or international agreements to end warfare. It tended to glorify warfare, the taking of initiative, and the warrior male role.

Social Darwinism played an important role across Europe, but J. Leslie has argued that it played a critical and immediate role in the strategic thinking of some important hawkish members of the Austro-Hungarian government. Social Darwinism, therefore, normalized war as an instrument of policy and justified its use.

== Arms race ==
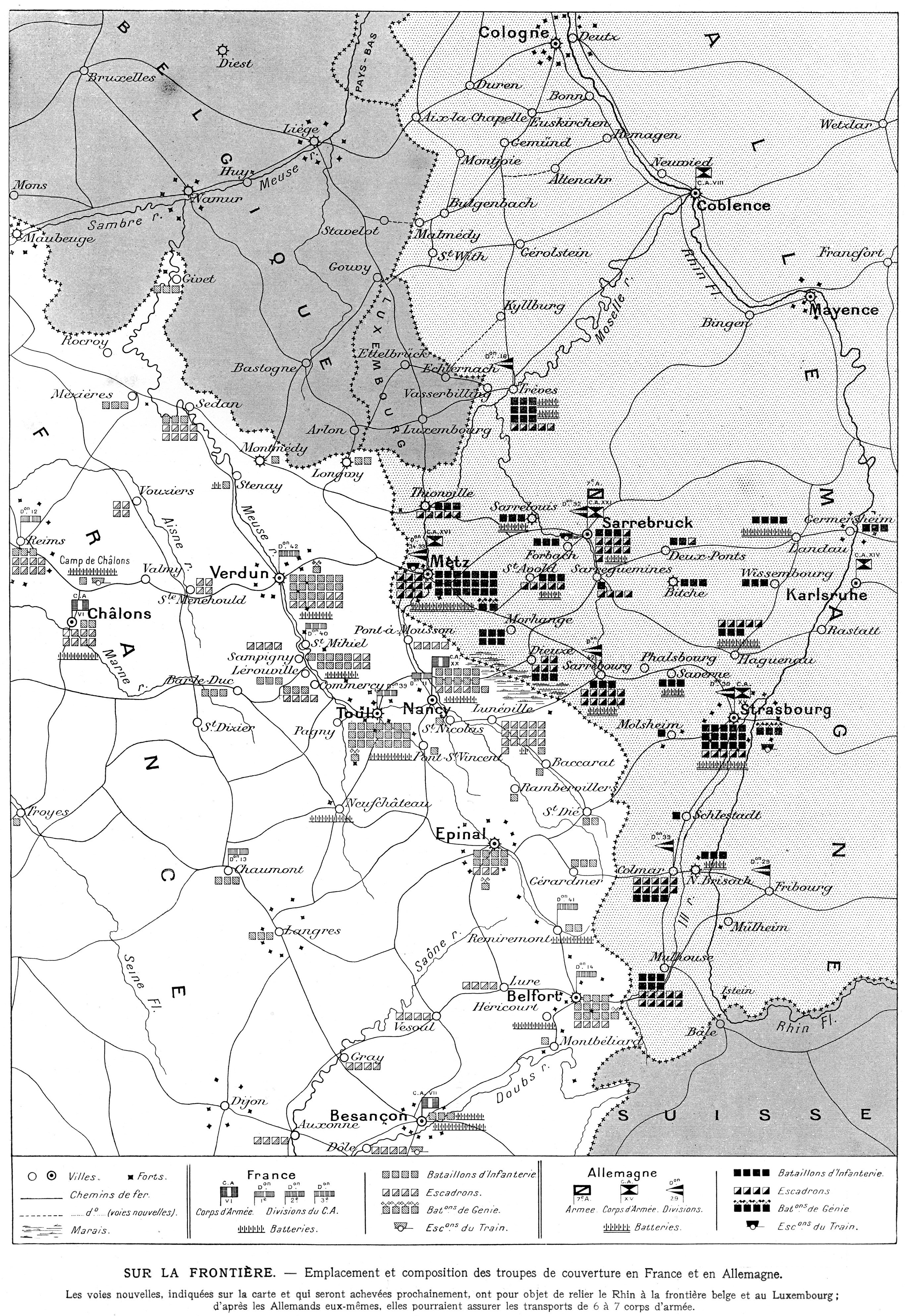
French and German troop dispositions along their common border, 1913

By the 1870s to 1880s, all the major powers were preparing for a large-scale war - although none expected one. Britain neglected its small army but focused on building up the Royal Navy, which was already stronger than the next two largest navies combined. Germany, France, Austria, Italy, Russia, and some smaller countries set up conscription systems in which young men would serve from one to three years in the army and then spend the next twenty years or so in the reserves, with annual summer training. Men with higher social status became officers. Each country devised a mobilization system to call up reserves quickly and send them to key points by rail.

Every year, general staffs updated and expanded their plans in terms of complexity. Each country stockpiled arms and supplies for an army that ran into the millions. Germany in 1874 had a regular professional army of 420,000 with an additional 1.3 million reserves. By 1897, the regular army was 545,000 strong and the reserves 3.4 million. The French in 1897 had 3.4 million reservists, Austria 2.6 million, and Russia 4.0 million. The size of military manpower increased: conscription-law changes in France in 1913, for example, boosted numbers in the French military on the eve of conflict. The various national war-plans had been perfected by 1914, but with Russia and Austria trailing in effectiveness. Recent wars since 1865 had typically been short: a matter of months. All war-plans called for a decisive opening and assumed victory would come after a short war. None planned for the food and munitions needs of the long stalemate that actually unfolded from 1914 to 1918.

As David Stevenson puts it, "A self-reinforcing cycle of heightened military preparedness... was an essential element in the conjuncture that led to disaster.... The armaments race... was a necessary precondition for the outbreak of hostilities." David Herrmann goes further by arguing that the fear that "windows of opportunity for victorious wars" were closing, meaning that "the arms race did precipitate the First World War". If the assassination of Franz Ferdinand had occurred in 1904 or even in 1911, Herrmann speculates, there might have been no war. It was "the armaments race and the speculation about imminent or preventive wars" that made his death in 1914 the trigger for war.

One of the aims of the First Hague Conference of 1899, held at the suggestion of Emperor Nicholas II of Russia, was to discuss disarmament. The Second Hague Conference took place in 1907. All signatories except for Germany supported disarmament. Germany also did not want to agree to binding arbitration and mediation. The Kaiser was concerned that the United States would propose disarmament measures, which he opposed. All parties tried to revise international law to their own advantage.

=== Anglo-German naval race ===
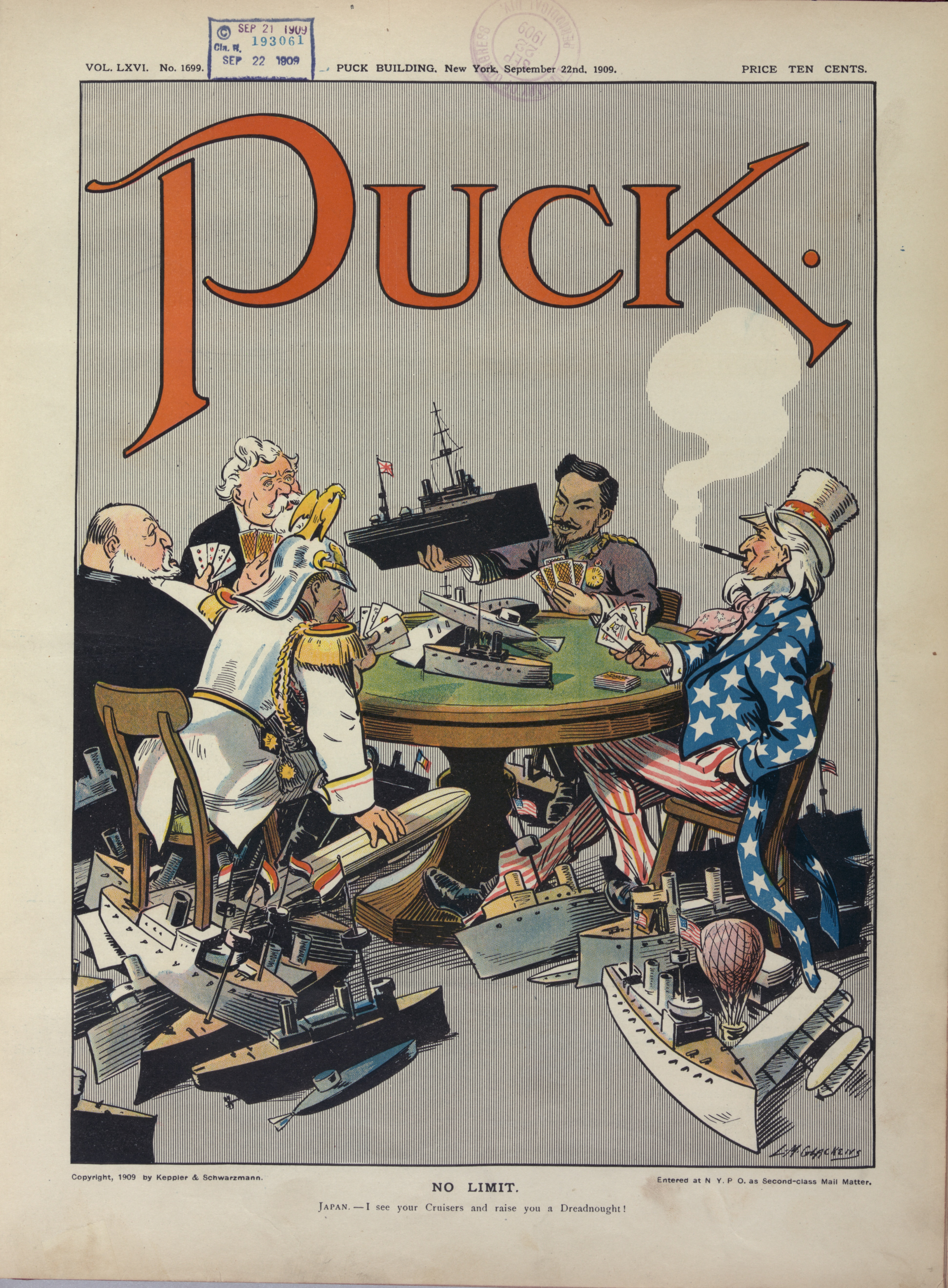
1909 cartoon in the American magazine Puck shows (clockwise) US, Germany, Britain, France and Japan engaged in naval race in a "no limit" game.

Historians have debated the role of the German naval buildup as the principal cause of deteriorating Anglo-German relations. In any case, Germany never came close to catching up with Britain.

Supported by Wilhelm II's enthusiasm for an expanded German navy, Grand Admiral Alfred von Tirpitz championed four Fleet Acts from 1898 to 1912. From 1902 to 1910, Britain's Royal Navy embarked on its own massive expansion to keep ahead of the Germans. The competition came to focus on the revolutionary new ships based on the design of Dreadnought, which was launched in 1906 and gave Britain a battleship that far outclassed any other in Europe.

Naval strength of powers in 1914
Country	Personnel	Large Naval Vessels (Dreadnoughts)	Tonnage
Russia	54,000	4	328,000
France	68,000	10	731,000
Britain	209,000	29	2,205,000
TOTAL	331,000	43	3,264,000
Germany	79,000	17	1,019,000
Austria-Hungary	16,000	4	249,000
TOTAL	95,000	21	1,268,000
(Source:)

The overwhelming British response proved to Germany that its efforts were unlikely ever to equal those of the Royal Navy. In 1900, the British had a 3.7:1 tonnage advantage over Germany; in 1910, the ratio was 2.3:1 and in 1914, it reached 2.1:1. Ferguson argues: "So decisive was the British victory in the naval arms race that it is hard to regard it as in any meaningful sense a cause of the First World War." However, the Kaiserliche Marine had narrowed the gap by nearly half and that the Royal Navy had had a long-standing policy of surpassing any two potential opponents combined. The US Navy was in a period of growth, which made the German gains seem very ominous in London.

In Britain in 1913, there was intense internal debate about new ships because of the growing influence of Admiral John Fisher's ideas and increasing financial constraints. In 1914, Germany adopted a policy of building submarines, instead of new dreadnoughts and destroyers, effectively abandoning the naval arms-race, but Berlin kept the new policy secret to delay other powers from following suit.

=== Russian interests in the Balkans and the Ottoman Empire ===
Major Russian goals included strengthening Saint Petersburg's role as the protector of Eastern Christians in the Balkans, such as in Serbia. Although Russia enjoyed a booming economy, growing population, and large armed forces, its strategic position was threatened by an expanding Ottoman military - trained by German experts and using the latest technology. The start of the war re-focussed attention on old Russian goals: expelling the Ottomans from Constantinople, extending Russian dominion into eastern Anatolia and Persian Azerbaijan, and annexing Galicia. Conquest of the Straits would have assured Russian predominance in the Black Sea and Russian access to the Mediterranean.

== Technical and military factors ==
=== Short-war illusion ===
Traditional narratives of the war suggested that when the war began, both sides believed that the war would end quickly. Rhetorically speaking, there was an expectation that the war would be "over by Christmas" in 1914. That is important for the origins of the conflict since it suggests that since it was expected that the war would be short, statesmen tended not to take gravity of military action as seriously as they might have done otherwise. Modern historians suggest a nuanced approach. There is ample evidence to suggest that statesmen and military leaders thought the war would be lengthy and terrible and have profound political consequences.

While it is true all military leaders planned for a swift victory, many military and civilian leaders recognized that the war might be long and highly destructive. The principal German and French military leaders, including Moltke, Ludendorff, and Joffre, expected a long war. British Secretary of State for War Lord Kitchener expected a long war: "three years" or longer, he told an amazed colleague.

Moltke hoped that if a European war broke out, it would be resolved swiftly, but he also conceded that it might drag on for years, wreaking immeasurable ruin. Asquith wrote of the approach of "Armageddon" and French and Russian generals spoke of a "war of extermination" and the "end of civilization". British Foreign Secretary Edward Grey famously stated just hours before Britain declared war, "The lamps are going out all over Europe, we shall not see them lit again in our lifetime."

Clark concluded, "In the minds of many statesmen, the hope for a short war and the fear of a long one seemed to have cancelled each other out, holding at bay a fuller appreciation of the risks."

=== Primacy of offensive and war by timetable ===
Moltke, Joffre, Conrad, and other military commanders held that seizing the initiative was extremely important. That theory encouraged all belligerents to devise war plans to strike first to gain the advantage. The war plans all included complex plans for mobilization of the armed forces, either as a prelude to war or as a deterrent. The continental Great Powers' mobilization plans included arming and transporting millions of men and their equipment, typically by rail and to strict schedules.

The mobilization plans limited the scope of diplomacy, as military planners wanted to begin mobilisation as quickly as possible to avoid being caught on the defensive. They also put pressure on policymakers to begin their own mobilization once it was discovered that other nations had begun to mobilize.

In 1969, A. J. P. Taylor wrote that mobilization schedules were so rigid that once they were begun, they could not be canceled without massive disruption of the country and military disorganisation, and they could not proceed without physical invasion (of Belgium by Germany). Thus, diplomatic overtures conducted after the mobilizations had begun were ignored. Hence the metaphor "war by timetable".

Russia ordered a partial mobilization on 25 July against Austria-Hungary only. Their lack of prewar planning for the partial mobilization made the Russians realize by 29 July that it would be impossible to interfere with a general mobilization.

Only a general mobilization could be carried out successfully. The Russians were, therefore, faced with only two options: canceling the mobilization during a crisis or moving to full mobilization, the latter of which they did on 30 July. They, therefore, mobilized along both the Russian border with Austria-Hungary and the border with Germany.

German mobilization plans assumed a two-front war against France and Russia and had the bulk of the German army massed against France and taking the offensive in the west, and a smaller force holding East Prussia. The plans were based on the assumption that France would mobilize significantly faster than Russia.

On 28 July, Germany learned through its spy network that Russia had implemented partial mobilisation and its "Period Preparatory to War". The Germans assumed that Russia had decided upon war and that its mobilisation put Germany in danger, especially since because German war plans, the so-called Schlieffen Plan, relied upon Germany to mobilise speedily enough to defeat France first by attacking largely through neutral Belgium before it turned to defeat the slower-moving Russians.

Christopher Clark states: "German efforts at mediation – which suggested that Austria should 'Halt in Belgrade' and use the occupation of the Serbian capital to ensure its terms were met – were rendered futile by the speed of Russian preparations, which threatened to force the Germans to take counter-measures before mediation could begin to take effect."

Clark also states: "The Germans declared war on Russia before the Russians declared war on Germany. But by the time that happened, the Russian government had been moving troops and equipment to the German front for a week. The Russians were the first great power to issue an order of general mobilisation and the first Russo-German clash took place on German, not on Russian soil, following the Russian invasion of East Prussia. That doesn't mean that the Russians should be 'blamed' for the outbreak of war. Rather it alerts us to the complexity of the events that brought war about and the limitations of any thesis that focuses on the culpability of one actor."

== Historiography ==
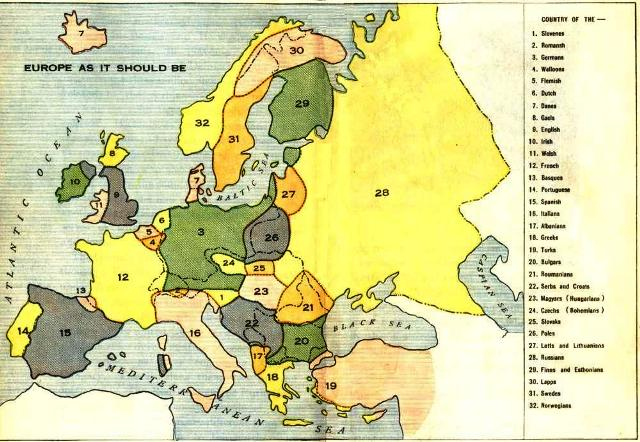
Louis P. Bénézet's map of "Europe As It Should Be" (1918), depicting imagined nations based on ethnic and linguistic criteria. It blamed German aggression on perceived threats to the traditional social order from radicals and ethnic nationalists.

Immediately after the end of hostilities, Anglo-American historians argued that Germany was solely responsible for the start of the war. However, academic work in the English-speaking world in the late 1920s and the 1930s blamed the participants more equally. Meanwhile German academics also challenged the claim that Germany was solely or primarily to blame.

In the 1960s the German historian Fritz Fischer challenged prevailing German academic opinion by arguing that Germany's conservative leaders had deliberately sought war. This in turn unleashed an intense worldwide debate on Imperial Germany's long-term goals. The American historian Paul Schroeder agrees with the critics that Fisher exaggerated and misinterpreted many points. However, Schroeder endorses Fisher's basic conclusion:

From 1890 on, Germany did pursue world power. This bid arose from deep roots within Germany's economic, political, and social structures. Once the war broke out, world power became Germany's essential goal.

However, Schroeder argues that all of that was not the main cause of the war in 1914. Indeed, the search for a single main cause is not a helpful approach to history. Instead, there are multiple causes any one or two of which could have launched the war. He argues, "The fact that so many plausible explanations for the outbreak of the war have been advanced over the years indicates on the one hand that it was massively overdetermined, and on the other that no effort to analyze the causal factors involved can ever fully succeed."

Debate over the country that "started" the war and who bears the blame still continues. According to Annika Mombauer, a new consensus among scholars had emerged by the 1980s, mainly as a result of Fischer's intervention:

Few historians agreed wholly with his [Fischer's] thesis of a premeditated war to achieve aggressive foreign policy aims, but it was generally accepted that Germany's share of responsibility was larger than that of the other great powers.

On historians inside Germany, she adds, "There was 'a far-reaching consensus about the special responsibility of the German Reich' in the writings of leading historians, though they differed in how they weighted Germany's role."

== See also ==
- Causes of World War II
- Diplomatic history of World War I
  - American entry into World War I
  - Austro-Hungarian entry into World War I
  - British entry into World War I
  - French entry into World War I
  - German entry into World War I
  - Italian entry into World War I
  - Japanese entry into World War I
  - Ottoman entry into World War I
  - Russian entry into World War I
- History of the Balkans
- Historiography of the causes of World War I
- International relations (1814–1919)
  - Anglo-German naval arms race

== Sources ==
- Afflerbach, Holger, ed. (2015). The Purpose of the First World War: War Aims and Military Strategies (PDF). Schriften des Historischen Kollegs 91 (first ed.). Berlin: de Gruyter Oldenbourg. p. 268. ISBN 978-3-11-034622-0.
  - Fried, Marvin Benjamin (2015). "'A Life and Death Question': Austro-Hungarian War Aims in the First World War". The Purpose of the First World War. pp. 117–140. doi:10.1515/9783110443486-010. ISBN 978-3-11-034622-0.
- Clark, Christopher (2013). The Sleepwalkers: How Europe Went to War in 1914. HarperCollins. ISBN 978-0-06-219922-5.
- Ferguson, Niall (1999). The Pity of War. Basic Books. ISBN 978-0-465-05712-2.
- Gilbert, Martin (1994). First World War. Stoddart Publishing. ISBN 978-0-7737-2848-6.
- Lieven, Dominic (2016). Towards the Flame: Empire, War and the End of Tsarist Russia. Penguin. ISBN 978-0-14-139974-4.
- Martel, Gordon (2014). The Month that Changed the World: July 1914. OUP. ISBN 978-0-19-966538-9.
- Wargelin, Clifford F. (December 1997). "A High Price for Bread: The First Treaty of Brest- Litovsk and the Break-Up of Austria-Hungary, 1917–1918". The International History Review. 19 (4): 757–788. doi:10.1080/07075332.1997.9640803.
- Williamson, Samuel R. Jr. (1991). Austria-Hungary and the Origins of the First World War. St. Martin's Press. ISBN 978-0-312-05283-6.
