= AHA Prize in European International History =

American award for scholarship on European international history since 1895

The AHA Prize in European International History, formerly named the George Louis Beer Prize, is an award given by the American Historical Association for the best book in European international history from 1895 to the present written by a United States citizen or permanent resident. The prize was created in 1923 to honor the memory of George Beer, a prominent historian, member of the U.S. delegation at the 1919 Paris Peace Conference, and senior League of Nations official. Described by Jeffrey Herf, the 1998 laureate, as "the Academy Award" of book prizes for modern European historians, it is one of the most prestigious American prizes for book-length history. The European International History Prize is usually awarded to senior scholars in the profession; the American Historical Association restricts its other distinguished European history award, the Herbert Baxter Adams Prize, to young authors publishing their first substantial work. The name was changed in 2024.

Four historians—Edward W. Bennett, Carole Fink, Piotr S. Wandycz, and Gerhard Weinberg—have won the Beer Prize more than once.

== List of prizewinners ==
- 2026 — Edward Baring, Vulgar Marxism: Revolutionary Politics and the Dilemmas of Worker Education, 1891–1931
- 2025 — Samuel J. Hirst, Against the Liberal Order: The Soviet Union, Turkey, and Statist Internationalism, 1919–1939
- 2024 — Chelsea Schields, Offshore Attachments: Oil and Intimacy in the Caribbean
- 2023 — Emily Marker, Black France, White Europe: Youth, Race, and Belonging in the Postwar Era
- 2022 — Emily Greble, Muslims and the Making of Modern Europe
- 2021 — Francine Hirsch, Soviet Judgment at Nuremberg: A New History of the International Military Tribunal after World War II
- 2020 — Emma Kuby, Political Survivors: The Resistance, the Cold War, and the Fight against Concentration Camps after 1945
- 2019 — Quinn E. Slobodian, Globalists: The End of Empire and the Birth of Neoliberalism
- 2018 — Corey Ross, Ecology and Power in the Age of Empire: Europe and the Transformation of the Tropical World
- 2017 — Erik Linstrum, Ruling Minds: Psychology in the British Empire
- 2016 — Vanessa Ogle, The Global Transformation of Time: 1870–1950
- 2015 — Frederick Cooper, Citizenship between Empire and Nation: Remaking France and French Africa, 1945-60
- 2014 — Mary Louise Roberts, What Soldiers Do: Sex and the American GI in World War II France
- 2013 — R.M. Douglas, Orderly and Humane: The Expulsion of the Germans after the Second World War
- 2012 — Tara Zahra, The Lost Children: Reconstructing Europe's Families after World War II
- 2011 — David M. Ciarlo, Advertising Empire: Race and Visual Culture in Imperial Germany
- 2011 — Michael A. Reynolds, Shattering Empires: The Clash and Collapse of the Ottoman and Russian Empires, 1908–18
- 2010 — Holly Case, Between States: The Transylvanian Question and the European Idea During World War II
- 2009 — William I. Hitchcock, The Bitter Road to Freedom: A New History of the Liberation of Europe
- 2008 — Melvyn P. Leffler, For the Soul of Mankind: The United States, the Soviet Union, and the Cold War
- 2007 — J.P. Daughton, An Empire Divided: Religion, Republicanism, and the Making of French Colonialism, 1880–1914
- 2006 — Mark A. Lawrence, Assuming the Burden: Europe and the American Commitment to War in Vietnam
- 2005 — Carole Fink, Defending the Rights of Others: The Great Powers, the Jews, and International Minority Protection, 1878–1938
- 2004 — Kate Brown, A Biography of No Place: From Ethnic Borderland to Soviet Heartland
- 2003 — Timothy D. Snyder, The Reconstruction of Nations: Poland, Ukraine, Lithuania, Belarus, 1569–1999
- 2002 — Matthew Connelly, A Diplomatic Revolution: Algeria's Fight for Independence and the Origins of the Post–Cold War Era
- 2001 — John Connelly, Captive University: The Sovietization of East German, Czech, and Polish Higher Education, 1945–56
- 2000 — Marc Trachtenberg, A Constructed Peace: The Making of the European Settlement, 1945–63
- 1999 — Daniel T. Rodgers, Atlantic Crossings: Social Politics in a Progressive Age
- 1998 — Jeffrey Herf, Divided Memory: The Nazi Past in the Two Germanys
- 1997 — Vojtech Mastny, The Cold War and Soviet Insecurity: The Stalin Years
- 1995 — Mary Nolan, Visions of Modernity: American Business and the Modernization of Germany
- 1994 — Gerhard L. Weinberg, A World at Arms: A Global History of World War II
- 1993 — Christine A. White, British and American Commercial Relations with Soviet Russia, 1918–24
- 1992 — Nicole T. Jordan, The Popular Front and Central Europe: The Dilemmas of French Impotence, 1918–40
- 1991 — John R. Gillingham, Coal, Steel, and the Rebirth of Europe, 1945–55
- 1990 — Steven M. Miner, Between Churchill and Stalin. The Soviet Union, Great Britain, and the Origins of the Grand Alliance
- 1989 — Piotr S. Wandycz, The Twilight of the French Eastern Alliances, 1926–36: French-Czechoslovak-Polish Relations from Locarno to the Remilitarization of the Rhineland
- 1988 — Michael J. Hogan, The Marshall Plan: America, Great Britain, and the Reconstruction of Western Europe, 1947–52
- 1987 — Philip S. Khoury, Syria and the French Mandate: The Politics of Arab Nationalism
- 1985 — Carole Fink, The Genoa Conference: European Diplomacy, 1921–22
- 1984 — Wm. Roger Louis, The British Empire in the Middle East, 1945–51: Arab Nationalism, the United States, and Postwar Imperialism
- 1983 — Sarah M. Terry, Poland's Place in Europe: General Sikorski and the Origin of the Oder-Neisse Line, 1939–43
- 1982 — MacGregor Knox, Mussolini Unleashed, 1939–41: Politics and Strategy in Fascist Italy's Last War
- 1981 — Sally J. Marks, Innocent Abroad: Belgium at the Paris Peace Conference of 1919
- 1979 — Edward W. Bennett, German Disarmament and the West, 1932–33
- 1977 — Stephen A. Schuker, The End of French Predominance in Europe: The Financial Crisis of 1924 and the Adoption of the Dawes Plan
- 1976 — Charles S. Maier, Recasting Bourgeois Europe: Stabilization in France, Germany and Italy in the Decade After World War I
- 1972 — Jon S. Jacobson, Locarno Diplomacy: Germany and the West
- 1971 — Gerhard L. Weinberg, The Foreign Policy of Hitler’s Germany, Diplomatic Revolution in Europe, 1933–36
- 1970 — Samuel R. Williamson, Jr., The Politics of Grand Strategy: Britain and France Prepare for War, 1904–14
- 1969 — Richard Ullman, Britain and the Russian Civil War, November 1918 – February 1920
- 1967 — George A. Brinkley, The Volunteer Army and the Revolution in South Russia
- 1966 — Robert Wohl, French Communism in the Making
- 1965 — Paul S. Guinn, British Strategy and Politics, 1914–18
- 1964 — Ivo Lederer, Yugoslavia at the Paris Peace Conference
- 1964 — Harold Nelson, Land and Power: British and Allied Policy on Germany’s Frontiers, 1916–19
- 1963 — Edward W. Bennett, Germany and the Diplomacy of the Financial Crisis, 1931
- 1963 — Hans A. Schmitt, The Path to European Union
- 1962 — Piotr S. Wandycz, France and Her Eastern Allies, 1919–25
- 1961 — Charles F. Delzell, Mussolini's Enemies: The Italian Anti-Fascist Resistance
- 1960 — Rudolph Binion, Defeated Leaders: The Political Fate of Cailleux, Jouvenel, and Tardieu
- 1959 — Ernest R. May, The World War and American Isolation 1914–17
- 1958 — Victor S. Mamatey, The United States and East Central Europe
- 1957 — Alexander Dallin, German Rule in Russia, 1941–45
- 1956 — Henry Cord Meyer, Mitteleuropa in German Thought and Action, 1815–1945
- 1955 — Richard Pipes, The Formation of the Soviet Union
- 1954 — Wayne Vucinich, Serbia Between East and West: The Events of 1903–08
- 1953 — Russell H. Fifield, Woodrow Wilson and the Far East
- 1952 — Robert H. Ferrell, Peace in Their Time: The Origins of the Kellogg-Briand Pact
- 1943 — Arthur Norton Cook, British Enterprise in Nigeria
- 1941 — Arthur Marder, The Anatomy of British Sea Power
- 1940 — Richard H. Heindel, The American Impact on Great Britain, 1898–1914
- 1939 — Pauline R. Anderson, Background of Anti-English Feeling in Germany, 1890–1902
- 1938 — René Albrecht-Carrié, Italy at the Paris Peace Conference
- 1937 — Charles Porter, The Career of Théophile Delcassé
- 1934 — Ross Hoffman, Great Britain and the German Trade Rivalry, 1875–1914
- 1933 — Robert T. Pollard, China's Foreign Relations, 1917–31
- 1932 — Oswald H. Wedel, Austro-German Diplomatic Relations, 1908–14
- 1931 — Oron J. Hale, Germany and the Diplomatic Revolution: A Study in Diplomacy and the Press, 1904–06
- 1930 — Bernadotte E. Schmitt, The Coming of the War, 1914
- 1929 — M.B. Giffen, Fashoda: The Incident and Its Diplomatic Setting
- 1928 — Sidney Bradshaw Fay, The Origins of the World War
- 1925 — Edith Stickney, Southern Albania or Northern Epirus in European International Affairs, 1912–23
- 1924 — Alfred L.P. Dennis, The Foreign Policies of Soviet Russia
- 1923 — Walter Russell Batsell, The Mandatory System: Its Historical Background and Relation to the New Imperialism
- 1923 — Edward Mead Earle, Turkey, the Great Powers, and the Bagdad Railway

== See also ==
- List of history awards
- Prizes named after people
