= Harvey A. DeWeerd =

American historian

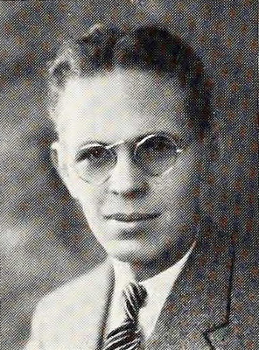
- Harvey A. DeWeerd, 1931
- Born: Harvey Arthur DeWeerd; September 21, 1902; Holland, Michigan
- Died: November 22, 1979 (aged 77); Los Angeles, California

Academic background
- Education: Hope College (B.A.), University of Michigan (M.A., Ph.D.)

Academic work
- Discipline: History, Military history
- Institutions: Colorado Agricultural College, Michigan State University, Wittenberg College, Denison University, RAND Corporation

Harvey A. DeWeerd (1902–1979) was an American historian on military affairs.

DeWeerd received his bachelor's degree from Hope College, and both Master's and Doctoral degrees from the University of Michigan, where he studied under Claude H. Van Tyne. He taught at Colorado Agricultural College, Michigan State, Wittenberg College, and Denison University. From January 1938 to 1942, he served as the first professional historian to edit the Journal of the American Military Foundation which would eventually become the Journal of Military History, the scholarly journal of the Society for Military History.

DeWeerd served in the United States Army from December 3, 1942, to June 30, 1946. He served as an officer, assigned to edit Infantry Journal, one of the U.S. Army's professional service journals. Following the war and his demobilization, he took up a previously offered position at the University of Missouri, where he taught from the fall semester in 1946 through 1953. He joined the RAND Corporation for the 1953–1954 academic year and then stayed on full time with RAND from November 1964 onwards. He died of cancer in November 1979.

His scholarly papers are held at the Library of the George C. Marshall Foundation.

== Bibliography ==
Publications by Harvey A. DeWeerd:

- Great Soldiers of the Two World Wars (New York: W.W. Norton, 1941)
- "Churchill, Lloyd George, Clemenceau: The Emergence of the Civilian," in Edward Mead Earle (ed.), Makers of Modern Strategy: Military Thought from Machiavelli to Hitler (Princeton, NJ: Princeton University Press, 1943), 287–305
- Great Soldiers of World War II (New York: W.W. Norton, 1944)
- Henry Adams; H. A. DeWeerd (ed.), The War of 1812 (Washington, D.C.: Infantry Journal, 1944)
- George C. Marshall; H. A. DeWeerd (ed.), Selected Speeches and Statements (Washington, D.C.: Infantry Journal, 1945)
- President Wilson Fights His War: World War I and the American Intervention (New York: Macmillan & Co., 1968)
