= Henry Cord Meyer =

American historian of Europe

Historian Henry Cord Meyer, 1974. Photo source: San Diego Air & Space Museum Archives

Henry Cord Meyer (1912 – 2001) was an American historian specializing in modern European and Central European history. He was an expert on the politics and economics of airships in the post-World War I period (1920–1938).

== Biography ==
The only child of German immigrants Henry H. and Sophie (née Abhmann) Meyer, Henry Cord Meyer was born on 12 February 1913 in Chicago, Illinois. After his father died in 1920, Meyer and his mother moved first to Eldora, Colorado; Meyer grew up in Colorado Springs. Meyer earned his B.A. degree at the University of Colorado in 1935; he spent one year as a student at the Konsular Academy in Vienna (1935–1936) before continuing his studies in the United States, receiving his master's degree at the University of Iowa (1937). He received his Ph.D. from Yale University in 1941. His dissertation, “Mittleuropa: Concept and Reality, 1914-1917,” which was later published as a book, was written under the supervision of Hajo Holborn, the eminent historian.

== Career ==
Meyer was commissioned as an ensign in the Navy at the start of World War II and was recruited by William Donovan to serve as a commissioned officer in the Office of Strategic Services, joining other historians performing intelligence work. As one of the planners for the 1943 Operation Torch invasion of Northern Africa, Meyer researched port capacities and possible landing sites. He returned to academia after the war, joining the history faculty of Pomona College as a specialist in Central European history. While at Pomona, he received the 1956 George Louis Beer Prize (American Historical Association) for his 1955 book, Mitteleuropa in German Thought and Action, 1815-1945. He was a 1960 Guggenheim Fellow, studying German and East European History. Leaving Pomona in 1964, Meyer was a founding member of the History Department at UC Irvine (retired, 1981; emeritus to 1999). Late in his career, Meyer became an authority on the political and economic history of dirigibles, studying rigid airship travel from its early development by the Schütte-Lanz and Luftschiffbau Zeppelin companies; he also researched the history of the U.S. Navy's airships, including the USS Shenandoah, the USS Akron and the USS Macon, and studied the British Air Ministry's dirigible program, including the R100 and R101 airships. He conducted an extensive correspondence with figures involved with airship travel and mail service and interviewed survivors of the Hindenburg disaster.

In 1974 Meyer contacted director Robert Wise regarding the production plans of the film The Hindenburg and was granted access to the production during filming. Interviewed in 1976, Meyer said that the film's dramatic narrative – that anti-Nazi sabotage of the Hindenburg was the cause of the disaster – was not historically accurate. He argued that in 1937 there was no organized anti-Nazi resistance in Germany.

Meyer was a prolific scholar, publishing many articles and book reviews in his career; he was the author of seven books. His research interests included German history since 1815, European history since 1848, 19th and 20th century European diplomatic history, and German-Slav relations in the 19th and 20th centuries. His later research included work on the emotional and psychological aspects of slogans (see Drang nach Osten) and images as they relate to perceptions about national identities; he also investigated the phenomena of political manipulation of technology. In his last work, Airships in International Affairs 1890-1940, Meyer collaborated with airship expert John Duggan. Considered by many an expert on the propaganda use of the airship, Meyer was not averse to sharing his knowledge and expertise with other airship scholars. At his death, Meyer was planning a book on airship political documents and working on his memoirs.

Meyer died on September 30, 2001, in Claremont, California.

In 2002, Meyer's extensive airship research papers and photograph collection were donated to the San Diego Air & Space Museum Archives.

== Selected bibliography ==
- Duggan, J., & Meyer, H. (2001). Airships in International Affairs 1890 - 1940. Springer.
- Meyer, H. C. (1996). Drang nach Osten: fortunes of a slogan-concept in German-Slavic relations; 1849-1990. Lang.
- Trimble, W. F., & Meyer, H. C. (1993). The Politics of Aircraft: Building an American Military Industry. JSTOR. Retrieved from https://www.jstor.org/stable/3106564
- Meyer, H. C., & Lighter-Than-Air Institute. (1998). Count Zeppelin: a psychological portrait. Auckland, N.Z.: Lighter-Than-Air Institute.
- Meyer, H. C. (1998). Book Review: National Identity and Weimar Germany: Upper Silesia and the Eastern Border, 1918–1922. By Tooley T. Hunt. Central European History, 31(4), 452–453.
- Meyer, H. C. (1997). A Postal Historian's Daydream. Zeppelin Study Group Newsletter, 12(44), 3–5.
- Meyer, H. C. (1996). Drang nach Osten : fortunes of a slogan-concept in German-Slavic relations, 1849 - 1990. Bern [u.a.: Lang.
- Meyer, H. C. (1991). Airshipmen, Businessmen, and Politics, 1890-1940.
- Meyer, H. C. (1986). Over the years, Collected Works, 1961-1970 (Vol. II). Irvine, Calif.: Schlacks.
- Meyer, H. C. (1986). Collected Works: Essays and articles, 1937-1960 (Vol. 1). C. Schlacks Jr., Publisher.
- Meyer, H. C. (1983). Eckener's struggle to save the airship for Germany, 1919–1929. Buoyant Flight, 29(2), 2–9.
- Meyer, H. C. (1981). Politics, Personality, and Technology: Airships in the Manipulations of Dr. Hugo Eckener and Lord Thomson, 1919–1930. Aerospace Historian, 165–172.
- Meyer, H. C. (1981). Arthur J. Marder: 1910–1980. The Journal of Military History, 45(2), 87.
- Meyer, H. C. (1980). Book Review: Jan Romein. The Watershed of Two Eras: Europe in 1900. Translated by Arnold J. Pomerans. The American Historical Review, 85(1), 114–115.
- Meyer, H. C. (1979). How Philatelists kept the Zeppelins Flying. American Philatelist, 796–8.
- Meyer, H. C. (1979). French Perceptions of the German Airship Revival, 1924–1937. South Atlantic Quarterly, Winter, 107–121.
- Meyer, H. C. (1973). The long generation: Germany from empire to ruin, 1913-1945. New York: Harper & Row.
- Meyer, H. C. (1971). Book Review: Germany and the Ottoman Empire 1914–1918, by Ulrich Trumpener. Canadian Journal of History, 6(2), 222–223.
- Meyer, H. C. (1969). Teaching the past in the present. In The quest for relevance (Vol. III, pp. 31–42). Washington, D.C.
- Meyer, H. C. (1967). Naumann and Rathenau : their paths to the Weimar Republic. In L. Krieger & F. Stern (Eds.), The responsibility of power: Historical essays in honor of Hajo Holborn (pp. 325–339). New York.
- Meyer, H. C. (1966). Book Review: The Federation of German Industry in Politics Gerard Braunthal. Retrieved from http://www.journals.uchicago.edu/doi/pdfplus/10.1086/239945
- Meyer, H. C. (1963). As others see us. Pomona Today, LXI.
- Meyer, H. C. (1961). Berlin – No loss but the name? Claremont Quarterly, 5–20.
- Meyer, H. C. (1960). Book Review: Lebendige Vergangenheit: Beiträge zur Historisch-Politischen Selbstbesinnung Gerhard Ritter. The Journal of Modern History, 32(1). Retrieved from http://www.journals.uchicago.edu/doi/pdfplus/10.1086/238376
- Meyer, H. C. (1960). Five images of Germany: half a century of American views on German history (Vol. 27). Service Center for Teachers of History.
- Meyer, H. C. (1960). Das Zeitalter des Imperialismus. Propyläen Weltgeschichte, 10.
- Meyer, H. C. (1957). Der „Drang nach Osten “in den Jahren 1860–1914. Die Welt Als Geschichte, 17, 1–8.
- Meyer, H. C. (1955). With the Russian historians in Rome. Claremont Quarterly, 37–44.
- Meyer, H. C. (1955). Mitteleuropa in German Thought and Action, 1815-1945.
- Meyer, H. C. (1955). Mitteleuropa als symptom der gegenwärtigen europäischen Krise. Welt Als Geschichte, XV, 188–95.
- Meyer, H. C. (1955). Friedrich Naumann's Mitteleuropa. In Mitteleuropa (pp. 194–217). Springer. Retrieved from https://link.springer.com/chapter/10.1007/978-94-015-2469-8_9
- Meyer, H. C. (1954). Germany renascent. [Charlottesville, Va.: [The Virginia Quarterly Review].
- Meyer, H. C. (1951). German Economic Relations with Southeastern Europe, 1870–1914. The American Historical Review, 57(1), 77–90.
- Meyer, H. C. (1950). Germans in the Ukraine, 1918. Excerpts from Unpublished Letters. American Slavic and East European Review, 9(2), 105–115.
- Meyer, H. C. (1946). Mitteleuropa in German political geography. Annals of the Association of American Geographers, 36(3), 178–194.
- Meyer, H. C. (1945). Austria's Economic Future. South Atlantic Quarterly, XLIV, 362–70.
- Meyer, H. C. (1942). Rohrbach and His Osteuropa. Russian Review, 2(1), 60–69.
