= Victor S. Mamatey =

American historian (1917–2007)

- Born: Victor Samuel Mamatey; February 2, 1917; North Braddock, Pennsylvania, U.S.
- Died: January 18, 2007 (aged 89); Tallahassee, Florida, U.S.
- Education: Comenius University; Harvard University (MA); University of Paris (PhD)
- Occupation: Historian
- Father: Albert Mamatey
- Awards: George Louis Beer Prize (1958)

Victor Samuel Mamatey (February 2, 1917 – January 18, 2007) was an American professor of history.

== Biography ==
Mamatey was born in North Braddock, Pennsylvania. His father, Albert Mamatey, was a Slovak immigrant to the United States, active in Slovak immigrant organizations in the United States.

Mamatey spent his childhood years in Bratislava. Subsequently, he earned a diploma from the Comenius University in Bratislava and then completed his undergraduate work at the University of Chicago before earning his Master of Arts from Harvard University.

In 1942, Mamatey enlisted into the United States Army Air Corps and served in the China-India-Burma theatre. After demobilization, Mamatey enrolled at the Sorbonne in Paris, where he earned a PhD.

In 1949, Mamatey moved to Tallahassee, Florida, to accept a faculty position with the history department at Florida State University. He was promoted to chairman of the department in 1964. In 1967, he moved to the University of Georgia. At the University of Georgia he assumed the duties of research professor and served for a year in 1972, and 1973 as acting dean of the Franklin College of Arts and Sciences. In 1984 he retired.

A recognized expert in East European history, Mamatey authored, co-authored and edited a number of books and other publications, including The World in the Twentieth Century (Boston, 1962). He won the American Historical Association's George Louis Beer Prize in 1958 for The United States and East Central Europe, and a Guggenheim fellowship.

Mamatey supported the University Library in Bratislava, Slovakia, to which he regularly sent large volumes of books on Slavic studies he had collected. The University Library in Bratislava maintains a Library of Victor S. Mamatey.

Mamatey died in Tallahassee, Florida.

== External references ==
- Library of Victor S. Mamatey
