= Piotr S. Wandycz =

Polish-American historian

Piotr Stefan Wandycz (September 20, 1923 – July 29, 2017) was a Polish-American historian. He was also the President of the Polish Institute of Arts and Sciences of America, and professor emeritus at Yale University, specializing in Eastern and Central European history.

== Life ==
Wandycz was born in Kraków in 1923 during the Second Polish Republic to Damian and Stefania (Dunikowska) Wandycz and raised in Lwow. He left the country during World War II on September 17, 1939, when the Soviet army invaded eastern Poland. He and his family crossed into Romania, and in 1940 went to France. Graduating from the Polish Lycee in Villard de Lans, he studied at the University of Grenoble (1941–42). In late 1942 he reached the United Kingdom where he served in the Polish army until 1945 as a second lieutenant. After the war he studied at the University of Cambridge where he received B.A. and M.A. degrees, and at the London School of Economics (Ph.D. 1951). Later he moved to the United States, where he taught at Indiana University before coming to Yale University in 1966 as an associate professor. He was promoted to a full professorship in 1968 and was named Bradford Durfee Professor in 1989. At Yale, he served as director of graduate studies in Russian and East European studies and in history, the chair of the Council on Russian and East European Studies, and the director of the Language and Area Center. He authored 18 books and over 400 articles and book reviews.

Piotr S. Wandycz was a member of the Polish Academy of Sciences, the Polish Institute of Arts and Sciences of America, the Polish Academy of Learning, and an honorary member of the Polish Historical Association. His many other honors included the Commander's Cross of the Order of Polonia Restituta and honorary degrees from the University of Wrocław, the Sorbonne, the Jagiellonian University, and the Catholic University of Lublin. He died on July 29, 2017.

== Works ==
Piotr Wandycz was a noted authority on Eastern and Central European history. His many books include:

- Wandycz, Piotr (2008) [1962]. France and Her Eastern Allies, 1919–1925. ACLS Humanities E-Book. ISBN 978-1597404037. (won the 1962 American Historical Association's George Louis Beer Prize);
- Wandycz, Piotr (2016) [1988]. The Twilight of French Eastern Alliances, 1926–1936. Princeton, NJ: Princeton University Press. ISBN 978-0691635255. (received the Wayne S. Vucinich Prize of the American Association for the Advancement of Slavic Studies); and
- Wandycz, Piotr (1992). The Price of Freedom: A History of East Central Europe from the Middle Ages to the Present. New York: Routledge. ISBN 978-0415254915. (was a 1992 History Book Club selection)

== See also ==
- List of Poles
