= René Albrecht-Carrié =

René Albrecht-Carrié (20 January 1904 – August 1978) was a diplomatic historian.

Born in Smyrna, Albrecht-Carrié was educated at Columbia University, where he gained an AB in 1923 and a PhD in 1938. He spent his academic career as Professor of History at Barnard College (1945–1969) and at Columbia's School of International Affairs (1953–1969).

His book Italy at the Paris Peace Conference won the George Louis Beer Prize in 1938 and his The Meaning of the First World War won the Mid Atlantic States Association's Medal.

== Works ==
- Italy at the Paris Peace Conference (New York: Columbia University Press, 1938).
- Italy from Napoleon to Mussolini (New York: Columbia University Press, 1950).
- A Diplomatic History of Europe Since the Congress of Vienna (New York: Harper and Row, 1958; rev. ed. 1973). online to borrow
- France, Europe and the World Wars (Geneva: Droz, 1960; New York: Harper and Row, 1961; Greenwood Press, 1975).
- Europe Since 1815 (New York: Harper and Row, 1962).
- One Europe, The Historical Background of European Unity (New York: Doubleday, 1965).
- The Meaning of the First World War (Englewood Cliffs, New Jersey: Prentice Hall, 1965).
- The Concert of Europe (New York: Harper and Row, 1968).
- Le Rivoluzioni Nazionali (Torino: Unione Tipografico-Editrice Torinese, 1969).
- Britain and France, Adaptations to a Changing Context of Power (New York: Doubleday, 1970).
- Europe Fifteen Hundred to Eighteen Forty-Eight (Totowa, New Jersey: Littlefield, Adams and Co., 1953).
- Europe After Eighteen Fifteen (Totowa, New Jersey: Littlefield, Adams and Co., 1972).
- Twentieth Century Europe (Totowa, New Jersey: Littlefield, Adams and Co., 1973).
- Adolphe Thiers (Boston: Twayne, 1977).
