= Stephen A. Schuker =

American historian (1939–2026)

- Born: Stephen Alan Schuker; 1939
- Died: October 8, 2026 (aged 87)
- Education: Cornell University (BA); Harvard University (MA, PhD)
- Occupation: Historian
- Awards: George Louis Beer Prize (1977)

Stephen Alan Schuker (1939 – October 8, 2026) was an American historian who served as William W. Corcoran Professor of History at the University of Virginia.

== Life and career ==
Schuker was educated at Cornell University, where he gained a BA in 1959. In 1958 Cornell awarded him a $500 prize for being their outstanding history student. He was awarded an MA and a PhD by Harvard University in 1962 and 1969, respectively. According to Walter A. McDougall, Schuker's book The End of French Predominance in Europe is the definitive work on the circumstances leading to the adoption of the 1924 Dawes Plan on German reparations. The book was awarded the Gilbert Chinard Prize (in 1976) and the George Louis Beer Prize (in 1977).

Stephen Schuker died on October 8, 2026, at the age of 87.

== Works ==
- The End of French Predominance in Europe: The Financial Crisis of 1924 and the Adoption of the Dawes Plan (Chapel Hill: University of North Carolina Press, 1976).
- American "Reparations" to Germany, 1919-33: Implications for the Third-World Debt Crisis (Princeton: Princeton Studies in International Finance, 1988).
