= Edward Mead Earle =

American historian

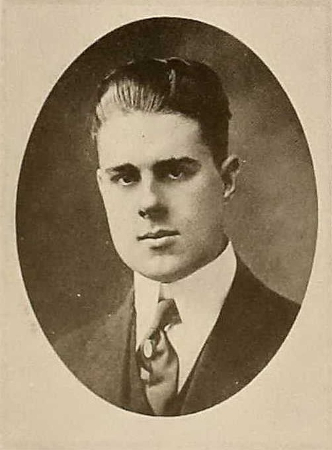
- 1917 Columbia University Yearbook
- Born: May 20, 1894; New York City
- Died: June 23, 1954 (aged 60)

Academic background
- Education: Columbia University

Academic work
- Discipline: Historian
- Institutions: Institute for Advanced Study
- Notable works: Makers of Modern Strategy: Military Thought From Machiavelli to Hitler

Edward Mead Earle (1894 – June 23, 1954) was an American author and university lecturer who specialized in the role of the military in foreign relations. He was a consultant to various departments of the U.S. government, especially during World War II. For twenty years he was a professor in the School of Economics and Politics at the Institute for Advanced Study in Princeton.

== Education and career ==
Earle got his B.A., M.A., and later his Ph.D. at Columbia University in 1923. On February 11, 1919, he married Beatrice Lowndes. He joined the faculty of the Institute for Advanced Study on September 1, 1934, and remained there until his death in 1954.

According to David Ekbladh, writing in the journal International Security, Earle and his foundation, government, and university collaborators had significant influence on the evolution of security studies as a separate field, with effects that are still felt today. Earle, played another prominent role during the war. He helped establish the Department of Research and Analysis of the Office of Strategic Services.

Earle was the inaugural winner of the George Louis Beer Prize given by the American Historical Association, in 1923, for his book Turkey, the Great Powers, and the Bagdad Railway.

For his service in World War II, Edward M. Earle received the Presidential Medal for Merit in 1946. An illness on June 2, 1954, the day he was presented with Columbia University's honorary degree of Doctor of Humane Letters, caused his hospitalization at the Hospital for Special Surgery, where he died on June 23 at the age of 60. He and his wife, Beatrice, were the parents of a daughter, Rosamond.

== Works ==
- (1923) Turkey, the Great Powers, and the Bagdad Railway: A Study in Imperialism, New York: Macmillan, New York, OCLC Number 164691663
- (1943) Makers of Modern Strategy: Military Thought from Machiavelli to Hitler; with the collaboration of Gordon A. Craig and Felix Gilbert, Princeton University Press, OCLC Number 230143761
- (1951) Modern France: Problems of the Third and Fourth Republics, with Warren C. Baum, Russell & Russell, New York, OCLC Number 1872591
