= Mary Louise Roberts (historian) =

American historian

Mary Louise Roberts is an American historian currently the WARF Distinguished Lucie Aubrac Professor and Plaenert Bascom Professor of History at University of Wisconsin. For the 2020–2021 academic year, she additionally was Charles Boal Ewing Chair in Military History at the United States Military Academy.

== Works ==
- D-Day through French Eyes: Memoirs of Normandy 1944 (2014)
- Sheer Misery: Soldiers in Battle in WWII (2021)
- What Soldiers Do: Sex and the American GI in World War II France (2013)
- Disruptive Acts: The New Woman in Fin-De-Siecle France (2002)
