= Samuel R. Williamson Jr. =

American historian (born 1935)

- Born: Samuel Ruthven Williamson Jr. November 10, 1935 (age 90); Bogalusa, Louisiana, U.S.
- Education: Tulane University (BA); Harvard University (PhD)
- Occupation: Historian
- Awards: George Louis Beer Prize (1970)

Samuel Ruthven Williamson Jr. (born November 10, 1935, in Bogalusa, Louisiana) is an American historian. He was President and Vice-Chancellor of The University of the South (Sewanee),. He is the author of numerous books including Austria-Hungary and the Origins of the First World War (1991).

== Life and career ==
He received a B.A. from Tulane University and both a M.A. and Ph.D. from Harvard University. He taught history as an army officer at West Point from 1963 to 1966, at Harvard University from 1966 to 1972 where he was Senior Tutor of Kirkland House and assistant to the Dean of the College and at the University of North Carolina, Chapel Hill from 1972 to 1988, where he served as Dean of the College and provost of the university. In 1988 he became Vice-Chancellor (President) of Sewanee: The University of the South and retired from that position in 2000. He then taught history at Sewanee until December 2005.

He is a specialist in modern history, particularly the origins of World War I. His first book on the subject, The Politics of Grand Strategy: Britain and France Prepare for War, 1904-1914 won the George Louis Beer Prize of the American Historical Association for best book in international history upon publication in 1969. He went on to write four more books on World War I:The Origins of a Tragedy: July 1919 (1979), Essays on World War I (1983), Austria-Hungary and the Origins of the First World War (1991), and July 1914: Soldiers, Statesmen and the Coming of the Great War with Russell Van Wyk (2003). He is also the author of The Origins of U.S. Nuclear Strategy, 1945-1953 with Steve Rearden (1993).

In 2003, he became the director of the Sewanee History Project for which he wrote Sewanee Sesquicentennial History: The Making of the University of the South (2008) and The Sesquicentennial of the Laying of the Cornerstone of the University of the South October 10, 1860 (2010). He also edited five more books published by the Sewanee History Project: Ecce Quam Bonum (2007), Sewanee Perspectives on the History of the University of the South (2009), The Liberal Arts at Sewanee (2009), Sewanee Places: A Historical Gazetteer of the Domain of the University of the South (2010) and Yea Sewanee's Right! A Pictorial History of the University of the South (2011).

He is married to Joan Andress and the father of three children: George Samuel Williamson, Treeby Williamson Brown and Thaddeus M. Williamson.
