= Japanese entry into World War I =

Japan entered World War I as a member of the Allies on 23 August 1914, seizing the opportunity of Imperial Germany's distraction with the European War to expand its sphere of influence in China and the Pacific. There was minimal fighting. Japan already had a military alliance with Britain, but that did not obligate it to enter the war. It joined the Allies in order to make territorial gains. It acquired Germany's scattered small holdings in the Pacific and on the coast of China.

The other Allies pushed back hard against Japan's efforts to dominate China through the Twenty-One Demands of 1915. Japan's occupation of Siberia against the Bolsheviks proved unproductive. Japan's wartime diplomacy and limited military action produced few results. At the Paris Peace Conference in 1919, Japan was largely frustrated in its ambitions.

== Background ==
In the second half of the 19th century, Japan transformed dramatically from an isolated society to a modern, industrial, imperial, and militarily aggressive nation. It seized colonies such as Okinawa, defeated China in a major war (1894–1895), and to the world's astonishment defeated Russia in a full-scale war in 1904-05. It made aggressive demands, took full control of Korea (1910), was expanding into Manchuria, and demanded special privileges in the Chinese economy. By the start of World War I in 1914, Japan was considered a great power.

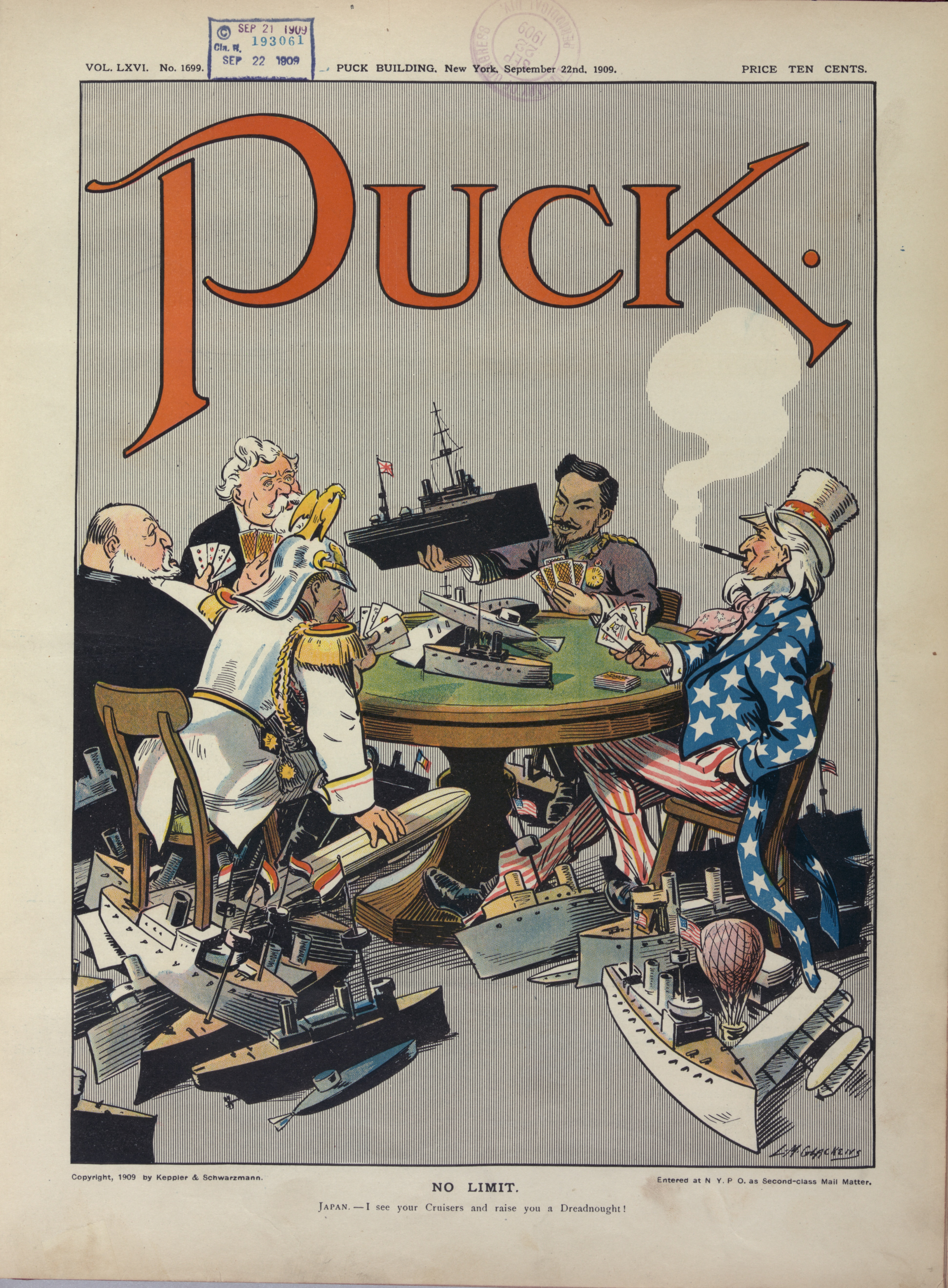
1909 cartoon in the U.S. magazine Puck shows (clockwise from rightmost figure) US, Germany, Britain, France and Japan engaged in a naval race in a "no limit" game

Japan and Great Britain had both avoided military alliances before 1900; that changed with the signing of the Anglo-Japanese Alliance in 1902. This diplomatic milestone put an end to Britain's splendid isolation, and the need to build up its navy in the Pacific. The alliance was renewed and expanded in scope twice, in 1905 and 1911. The original goal was opposition to Russian expansion. The alliance facilitated Japanese entry into World War I, but did not require Japan to do so.

William Howard Taft in August 1914 wrote that if Japan and the United States remained neutral, they might be able to mediate and help end the new war in Europe. Britain had not consulted Japan before declaring war on Germany, but soon after the war began it requested Japanese help in identifying the location of German shipping, which it admitted was a non-neutral act. Japan decided that for its own prestige in world affairs that it had to join the war effort. The European allies formally gave Japan the status of a full ally, and Britain, France, Russia and Italy guaranteed support at the prospective peace conference for Japan's claims to take over Germany's possessions in China. However, Britain became increasingly annoyed at Japanese aggression, and quietly warned Japan to not occupy German islands in the South Pacific (which were desired by Australia and New Zealand), become involved in the Eastern Pacific, nor seize the Dutch East Indies. When Japan ignored the hints, Britain made them public, which Japan perceived as an insult. Japan entered the war without restrictions, but in practice it took German possessions in China, German islands north of the equator, and made serious threats to Chinese autonomy - the Twenty-One Demands of 1915. China, pressured by Japan, and gaining widespread support from the other Allies, decided in 1917 that it had to enter the war as well.

The British were not at all pleased with Japan and fielded even stronger complaints from the US and Australia. The Paris Peace Conference (1919–1920) did endorse Japan's League of Nations mandates over several former German possessions. But Japan went further and demanded that a clause be inserted in the Covenant of the proposed League of Nations, announcing the organization's commitment to racial equality. Britain and its Dominions voted no, as did the US; the proposal never passed and the insult lingered for years. Finally the Japanese intervention in Siberia (1918–1922), while parallel to the interventions by Britain, France and the United States, seemed like too much of a land grab. By 1907, Japan had come to a détente with Russia, but the 1917 collapse of the Russian Imperial government meant that Siberia seemed wide open. Japan wanted to renew the basic treaty with Britain, but increasingly vocal opposition came from Britain and its Dominions, the United States, and China. The diplomatic solution was to end negotiations on renewal and have all the major players endorse the naval limitations agreement of the Washington Naval Conference of 1921–1922. To the disappointment of the Japanese, the treaty with Britain expired in 1923, leaving them with no allies.

== Operations against Germany ==
The onset of the First World War in Europe eventually showed how far German–Japanese relations had truly deteriorated. On 7 August 1914, only three days after Britain declared war on the German Empire, the Japanese government received an official request from the British government for assistance in destroying the German raiders of the Kaiserliche Marine in and around Chinese waters. Japan, eager to reduce the presence of European colonial powers in South-East Asia, especially on China's coast, sent Germany an ultimatum on 14 August 1914, which was left unanswered. Japan then formally declared war on Germany on 23 August 1914 thereby entering the First World War as an ally of Britain, France and Russia. It promptly seized the German-held Caroline, Marshall, and Mariana Islands in the Pacific.

The only major battle that took place between Japan and Germany was the siege of the German-controlled Chinese port of Qingdao in Kiautschou Bay. The German forces held out from August until November 1914, under a total Japanese/British blockade, sustained artillery barrages and manpower odds of 6:1 – a fact that gave a morale boost during the siege as well as later in defeat. After Japanese troops stormed the city, the German dead were buried at Tsingtao and the remaining troops were transported to Japan where they were treated with respect at places like the Bandō Prisoner of War camp. In 1919, when the German Empire formally signed the Treaty of Versailles, all prisoners of war were set free and returned to Europe.

Japan was a signatory of the Treaty of Versailles, which stipulated harsh repercussions for Germany. In the Pacific, Japan gained Germany's islands north of the equator (the Marshall Islands, the Carolines, the Marianas, the Palau Islands) and Kiautschou/Qingdao in China. Article 156 of the Treaty also transferred German concessions in Shandong to Japan rather than returning sovereign authority to the Republic of China, an issue soon to be known as Shandong Problem. Chinese outrage over this provision led to demonstrations, and a cultural movement known as the May Fourth Movement influenced China not to sign the treaty. China declared the end of its war against Germany in September 1919 and signed a separate treaty with Germany in 1921. This fact greatly contributed to Germany relying on China, and not Japan, as its strategic partner in East Asia for the coming years.

== Operations against China ==
In 1914, Japanese and British military forces liquidated Germany's holdings in China. Japan occupied the German military colony in Qingdao, and occupied portions of Shandong Province. China was financially chaotic, highly unstable politically, and militarily very weak. China declared war on Germany in August 1917 as a technicality to make it eligible to attend the postwar peace conference, where they hoped to find friends who would help block the threats of Japanese expansion. They planned to send a combat unit to the Western Front, but never did so. British diplomats were afraid that the U.S. and Japan would displace Britain's leadership role in the Chinese economy. They sought to play Japan and the United States against each other, while at the same time maintaining cooperation among all three nations against Germany.

In January 1915, Japan secretly issued an ultimatum of Twenty-One Demands to the Chinese government. They included Japanese control of former German rights, 99 year leases in southern Manchuria, an interest in steel mills, and concessions regarding railways. China did have a seat at the Paris Peace Conference in 1919. However, it was refused a return of the former German concessions and China had to accept the Twenty-One demands. A major reaction to this humiliation was a surge in Chinese nationalism expressed in the May Fourth Movement.

== Results ==
Japan's participation in World War I on the side of the Allies sparked unprecedented economic growth and earned Japan new colonies in the South Pacific seized from Germany. After the war Japan signed the Treaty of Versailles and enjoyed good international relations through its membership in the League of Nations and participation in international disarmament conferences. However, it resented the sense of superiority among the western powers. The Japanese army was becoming an increasingly independent political force with its own plans on how to deal with Manchuria, China, and Russia regardless of civilian decision-makers.

== See also ==
- Causes of World War I
- Diplomatic history of World War I
- Historiography of the causes of World War I
- History of China–Japan relations
- History of Japanese foreign relations
- International relations of the Great Powers (1814–1919)
- Japan during World War I
- List of territories occupied by Imperial Japan
- Russo-Japanese War of 1904–1905
