= Foreign relations of Meiji Japan =

During the Meiji period, the new Government of Meiji Japan also modernized foreign policy, an important step in making Japan a full member of the international community. The traditional East Asia worldview was based not on an international society of national units but on cultural distinctions and tributary relationships. Monks, scholars, and artists, rather than professional diplomatic envoys, had generally served as the conveyors of foreign policy. Foreign relations were related more to the sovereign's desires than to the public interest.

== Background ==
When the Tokugawa seclusion (the sakoku policy) was forcibly breached in 1853–54 by Commodore Matthew C. Perry of the United States Navy, Japan found that geography no longer ensured security—the country was defenseless against military pressures and economic exploitation by the Western powers. For Japan to emerge from the feudal period, it had to avoid the colonial fate of other Asian countries by establishing genuine national independence and equality.

After the Black Ships, Perry's naval squadron, had compelled Japan to enter into relations with the Western world, the first foreign policy debate was over whether Japan should embark on an extensive modernization to cope with the threat of the "eastward advance of Western power," which had already violated the independence of China, or expel the "barbarians" under the parole sonnō jōi and return to seclusion. Opening the country caused an upheaval that in the end caused the demise of the Tokugawa bakufu, but the shōguns of the period were too weak to pose a serious opposition. The opening of Japan accelerated a revolution that was just waiting to happen.

During the Meiji Restoration, Japan was already in a place slowly increasing its westernization practices brought on by the west. As Commodore Perry, and his team, sailed into the ports of Japan, they brought with them an unusual style of etiquette, such as dictation, books and standard of western technology. Prior to foreigners intruding Japan, the people had never seen steam ships, nevertheless guns with power, such as the ones Perry brought. During the pre-industrial Japan era, the country heavily relied on swords, and other weapons to defend itself. Japan was not used to seeing modern, and industrialized weaponry.

Since the first visit by Commodore Perry, "he brought fear into the lives of Japanese natives", as well as the government, run by the Emperor Mutsuhito. Having little-to-no means of fighting off such a strong, industrialized group, Japan's military officials ultimately gave in to Perry's demand to allow them to freely port, and trade, into Japan's domain. Not only did the feudal lords fail to preserve what they had for so long, but they were also pressured into signing multiple treaties with the Americans known as, “The Unequal Treaties”. Japan used Perry's visit to their advantage, learning from their weaponry, style of public speaking, and with time, was ultimately able to become an industrialized state.

Beginning with the Meiji Restoration of 1868, which established a new, centralized regime, Japan set out to "gather wisdom from all over the world" and embarked on an ambitious program of military, social, political, and economic reforms that transformed it within a generation into a modern nation-state and major world power. “Propelled by both fear and discontent with the old regime, they generated an ambitious agenda, through a process of trial and error, aiming to build a new sort of national power”. Multiple new policies were brought forth, One of the things that was brought forth was the Charter Oath, “The oath called for an assembly of daimyo in which decisions would be made after open discussion; “the high and the low” ( samurai and commoners) to administer together financial affairs; both military and “common people” to be allowed to fulfill their goals without strife; past evil practices to be abandoned and accepted world precepts followed; and, finally, knowledge to be sought worldwide to strengthen the foundation of imperial rule" (Hopper Pg.57). The Meiji oligarchy was aware of Western progress, and "learning missions" were sent abroad to absorb as much of it as possible. The Iwakura Mission, the most important one, was led by Iwakura Tomomi, Kido Takayoshi and Ōkubo Toshimichi, contained forty-eight members in total and spent two years (1871–73) touring the United States and Europe, studying every aspect of modern nations, such as government institutions, courts, prison systems, schools, the import-export business, factories, shipyards, glass plants, mines, and other enterprises. Upon returning, mission members called for domestic reforms that would help Japan catch up with the West.

The revision of unequal treaties, forced on Japan in the 1850s and 60s, became a top priority. The Meiji leaders also sketched a new vision for a modernized Japan's leadership role in Asia, but they realized that this role required that Japan develop its national strength, cultivate nationalism among the population, and carefully craft policies toward potential enemies. No longer could Westerners be seen as "barbarians," for example. In 1890 the emperor and his aids had created a new document concerning how education was to be handled. This was called the, “Rescript on Education”. It had all of the things that were to be adhered to concerning education within it, and this rescript lasted all the way until WW2 was ending. It was composed as follows, “The rescript, which contained the fundamental principles for all elementary education, was based on Confucian morality redefined by late nineteenth-century official doctrine, which embraced the sacredness of the emperor.” In time, Japan formed a corps of professional diplomats through education.

== Military buildup ==
Modern Japan's foreign policy was shaped at the outset by its need to reconcile its Asian identity with its desire for status and security in an international order dominated by the West. The principal foreign policy goals of the Meiji period (1868–1912) were to protect the integrity and independence of the nation against Western domination and to win equality of status with the leading nations of the West by reversing the unequal treaties. Because fear of Western military power was the chief concern of the Meiji leaders, their highest priority was building up the basic requirements for national defense, under the slogan "wealth and arms" (fukoku kyōhei). They saw that a modern military establishment required national conscription drawing manpower from an adequately educated population, a trained officer corps, a sophisticated chain of command, and strategy and tactics adapted to contemporary conditions. Finally, it required modern arms together with the factories to make them, sufficient wealth to purchase them, and a transportation system to deliver them.

An important objective of the military buildup was to gain the respect of the Western powers and achieve equal status for Japan in the international community. Inequality of status was symbolized by the treaties imposed on Japan when the country was first opened to foreign intercourse. The treaties were objectionable to the Japanese not only because they imposed low fixed tariffs on foreign imports and thus handicapped domestic industries, but also because their provisions gave a virtual monopoly of external trade to foreigners and granted extraterritorial status to foreign nationals in Japan, exempting them from Japanese jurisdiction and placing Japan in the inferior category of uncivilized nations. Many of the social and institutional reforms of the Meiji period were designed to remove the stigma of backwardness and inferiority represented by the "unequal treaties", and a major task of Meiji diplomacy was to press for early treaty revision.

== Overseas expansion ==
Once created, the Meiji military machine was used to extend Japanese power overseas, for many leaders believed that national security depended on expansion and not merely a strong defense. Room was also needed for population expansion. Within thirty years, the country's military forces had fought and defeated imperial China in the First Sino-Japanese War (1894–95), winning possession of Taiwan and China's recognition of Korea's independence. Ten years later, in the Russo-Japanese War (1904–5), Japan defeated tsarist Russia and won possession of southern Sakhalin as well as a position of paramount influence in Korea and southern Manchuria. By this time, Japan had been able to negotiate revisions of the unequal treaties with the Western powers and had in 1902 formed an alliance with the world's leading power, Britain.

=== Ryūkyū Islands ===
In 1879, Japan formally annexed the Ryukyuan kingdom, which had been under the control of the Shimazu clan of Satsuma since 1609.

==== Taiwan ====
The island of Formosa (Taiwan) had an indigenous population when Dutch traders in need of an Asian base to trade with Japan and China arrived in 1623. The Dutch East India Company (VOC) soon began to rule the natives. China took control in the 1660s, and sent in settlers.

In 1873 and 1874, friction came about between China and Japan over Taiwan, particularly when the Japanese launched a punitive expedition into Taiwan in the wake of the killing of several Okinawans by Taiwanese aborigines. By the 1890s there were about 2.3 million Han Chinese and 200,000 members of indigenous tribes living on Taiwan. After its victory in the First Sino-Japanese War in 1894–95, the peace treaty ceded the island to Japan.

Japan expected far more benefits from the occupation of Taiwan than they actually received. Japan realized that its home islands could only support a limited resource base, and it hoped that Taiwan, with its fertile farmlands, would make up the shortage. By 1905, Taiwan was producing rice and sugar and paying for itself with a small surplus. Perhaps more important, Japan gained enormous prestige by being the first nonwhite country to operate a modern colony. It learned how to adjust its German-based bureaucratic standards to actual conditions, and how to deal with frequent insurrections. The ultimate goal was to promote Japanese language and culture, but the administrators realize they first had to adjust to the Chinese culture of the people. Japan had a civilizing mission, and it opened schools so that the peasants could become productive and patriotic manual workers. Medical facilities were modernized, and the death rate plunged. To maintain order, Japan installed a police state that closely monitored everyone. In 1945, Japan was stripped of its overseas empire and Taiwan was returned to China.

=== Korea ===
The Korean Peninsula, a strategically located feature critical to the defense of the Japanese archipelago, greatly occupied Japan's attention in the nineteenth century. Earlier tension over Korea had been settled temporarily through the Japan–Korea Treaty of 1876, which opened Korean ports to Japan, and through the Tianjin Convention in 1885, which provided for the removal from Korea of both Chinese and Japanese troops sent to support contending factions in the Korean court. In effect, the convention had made Korea a co-protectorate of Beijing and Tokyo at a time when Russian, British, and American interests in the peninsula also were on the increase.

In 1894, China and Japan went to war over Korea in the First Sino-Japanese War, and the subsequent Treaty of Shimonoseki of April 1895 forced defeated China to recognize Korean independence, and later that year, Japanese agents would assassinate Korea's anti-Japanese Queen Min.

Ironically, a decade after the Treaty of Shimonoseki had forced China to recognize Korean independence, Japan, in the wake of the Russo-Japanese War, effectively forced Korea to sign the Eulsa Protective Treaty, which made Korea a protectorate of Japan. In 1910, Korea was formally annexed to the Japanese empire, beginning a period of Japanese colonial rule of Korea that would not end until 1945.

=== China ===
In 1871, despite Chinese consternation over Japan asserting its control over the Ryukyu Islands the previous year, China and Japan signed the Sino-Japanese Friendship and Trade Treaty.

Two years later, in 1873, the Japanese foreign minister Soejima Taneomi who had won the gratitude of the Chinese government for his handling of the María Luz incident in 1872, was dispatched to Beijing as an ambassador. His trip had three purposes: one was to convey the congratulations of the Emperor Meiji to the sixteen-year-old Tongzhi Emperor for his assumption of personal rule, the second was to exchange documents relating to the Trade and Friendship Treaty and the third was to discuss with the Chinese the punishment of some Taiwanese natives who had killed several shipwrecked Okinawans. Yet, despite the gratitude that the Chinese had expressed towards him for how he handled the Maria Luz case, Soejima found the officials arrogant and difficult to negotiate with. He nevertheless managed to obtain an audience with the emperor of China, and helped negotiate protocol for the audience that the Chinese emperor was to grant to the European and American envoys to China, earning him the gratitude of both the western envoys, and yet again, the Qing imperial court.

In 1874, Chinese and Japanese relations were put under strain when the Japanese took military action against Taiwan in order to pacify natives. Conflict between China and Japan would be averted in Korea in 1885 thanks to the negotiations between Li Hongzhang and Itō Hirobumi which led to the Tianjin Convention, which established a joint protectorate over Korea. This would postpone a war over Korea by a decade.

A crisis was precipitated in 1894 when a leading pro-Japanese Korean political figure was assassinated in Shanghai with Chinese complicity. Prowar elements in Japan called for a punitive expedition, which the cabinet resisted. With assistance from several Japanese nationalistic societies, the illegal Tonghak (Eastern Learning) nationalistic religious movement in Korea staged a peasant rebellion that was crushed by Chinese troops. Japan responded with force and quickly defeated China in the First Sino-Japanese War (1894–95). After nine months of fighting, a cease-fire was called and peace talks were held. The victor's demands were such that a Japanese protectorate over China seemed in the offing, but an assassination attempt on Li Hongzhang, China's envoy to the peace talks, embarrassed Japan, which then quickly agreed to an armistice. The Treaty of Shimonoseki accomplished several things: recognition of Korean independence; cessation of Korean tribute to China; a 200 million tael (Chinese ounces of silver, the equivalent in 1895 of US$150 million) indemnity to Korea from China; cession of Taiwan, the Penghu Islands, and the Liaodong Peninsula to Japan; and opening of Chang Jiang (Yangtze River) ports to Japanese trade. It also assured Japanese rights to engage in industrial enterprises in China.

Having their own imperialist designs on China and fearing China's impending disintegration, Russia, Germany, and France jointly objected to Japanese control of Liaodong. Threatened with a tripartite naval maneuver in Korean waters, Japan decided to give back Liaodong in return for a larger indemnity from China. Russia moved to fill the void by securing from China a twenty-five-year lease of Dalian (Dairen in Japanese, also known as Port Arthur) and rights to the South Manchurian Railway Company, a semiofficial Japanese company, to construct a railroad. Russia also wanted to lease more Manchurian territory, and, although Japan was loath to confront Russia over this issue, it did move to use Korea as a bargaining point: Japan would recognize Russian leaseholds in southern Manchuria if Russia would leave Korean affairs to Japan. The Russians only agreed not to impede the work of Japanese advisers in Korea, but Japan was able to use diplomatic initiatives to keep Russia from leasing Korean territory in 1899. At the same time, Japan was able to wrest a concession from China that the coastal areas of Fujian Province, across the strait from Taiwan, were within Japan's sphere of influence and could not be leased to other powers. In 1900, Japanese forces participated in suppressing the Boxer Rebellion, exacting still more indemnity from China.

=== Philippines ===
Between 1886 and 1891, some Japanese nationalist-activists discussed overseas expansion, including toward the Philippines, reflecting early efforts by ambitions.

Some Filipino revolutionaries viewed modernizing Japan under the Meiji Restoration as a potential source of arms, funds, or political support, inspired by Japan’s successful assertion of national power in East Asia. Emissaries from the Katipunan traveled to Japan to seek Japanese support for the revolution. Petitions were reportedly submitted to the Japanese Emperor to request assistance or even the establishment of a protectorate over the Philippines. The Spanish diplomat F.E. Reynoso stated that during the coronation of Tsar Nicholas II, with Marshal Yamagata, while at Moscow in 1894, the Japanese made an offer of 40 million pounds sterling to buy the Philippines from Spain.

=== British alliance ===
Japan then succeeded in attracting a Western ally to its cause. Japan and Britain, both of whom wanted to keep Russia out of Manchuria, signed the Treaty of Alliance in 1902, which was in effect until in 1921 when the two signed the Four Power Treaty on Insular Possessions, which took effect in 1923. The British recognized Japanese interests in Korea and assured Japan they would remain neutral in case of a Russo-Japanese war but would become more actively involved if another power (probably an allusion to France) entered the war as a Russian ally. In the face of this joint threat, Russia became more conciliatory toward Japan and agreed to withdraw its troops from Manchuria in 1903. The new balance of power in Korea favored Japan and allowed Britain to concentrate its interests elsewhere in Asia. Hence, Tokyo moved to gain influence over Korean banks, opened its own financial institutions in Korea, and began constructing railroads and obstructing Russian and French undertakings on the peninsula.

=== War with Russia ===
When Russia failed to withdraw its troops from Manchuria by an appointed date, Japan issued a protest. Russia replied that it would agree to a partition of Korea at the thirty-ninth parallel, with a Japanese sphere to the south and a neutral zone to the north. But Manchuria was to be outside Japan's sphere, and Russia would not guarantee the evacuation of its troops. Despite the urging of caution by most genro, Japan's hardliners issued an ultimatum to Russia, which showed no signs of further compromise. The Russo-Japanese War broke out in February 1904 with Japanese surprise attacks on Russian warships at Dalian and Chemulpo (in Korea, now called Incheon). Despite tremendous loss of life on both sides, the Japanese won a series of land battles and then decisively defeated Russia's Baltic Sea Fleet (renamed the Second Pacific Squadron) at the Battle of Tsushima in May 1905. At an American-mediated peace conference in Portsmouth, New Hampshire. In the Treaty of Portsmouth Russia acknowledged Japan's paramount interests in Korea and agreed to avoid "military measures" in Manchuria and Korea. Both sides agreed to evacuate Manchuria, except for the Guandong Territory (a leasehold on the Liaodong Peninsula) and restore the occupied areas to China. Russia transferred its lease on Dalian and adjacent territories and railroads to Japan, ceded the southern half of Sakhalin to Japan, and granted Japan fishing rights in the Sea of Okhotsk and the Bering Sea.

Japanese nationalism intensified after the Russo-Japanese War, and a new phase of continental expansion began after 1905. Politically and economically, Korea became a protectorate of Japan and in 1910 was formally annexed as a part of the empire (cf. Korea under Japanese rule). By means of the South Manchurian Railway, Japanese entrepreneurs vigorously exploited Manchuria. By 1907 Russia had entered into a treaty arrangement with Japan whereby both sides recognized the other's sphere of influence in Manchuria.

== Diplomats and scholars ==
- Mutsu Munemitsu
- Iwakura Tomomi
- Although he never assumed a government post, another influential Meiji period figure was Fukuzawa Yukichi (1835–1901). He was a prolific writer on many subjects, the founder of schools and a newspaper, and, above all, an educator bent on impressing his fellow Japanese with the merits of Westernization.
- British observer and diplomat Ernest Satow.

== See also ==
- History of Japanese foreign relations, 1850 to 2000
- History of Japanese foreign relations, 1910 to 1941
- International relations (1814–1919)
- International relations (1919–1939)
- Taishō foreign policy (1912-1926)
- Japanese militarism (1927-1945)
- Mudan incident
- Ōtsu incident
