= History of Japanese foreign relations =

The history of Japanese foreign relations deals with the international relations in terms of diplomacy, economics and political affairs from about 1850 to 2000. The kingdom was largely isolated before the 1850s, with limited contacts through Dutch traders. The Meiji Restoration was a political revolution that installed a new leadership that was eager to borrow Western technology and organization. The government in Tokyo carefully monitored and controlled outside interactions. Japanese delegations to Europe brought back European standards which were widely imposed across the government and the economy. Trade flourished, and Japan rapidly industrialized. In the late 19th century Japan defeated China, and acquired numerous colonies, including Formosa and Okinawa. The rapid advances in Japanese military prowess led to the Russo-Japanese War, the first time a non-Western nation defeated a European power. Imperialism continued as it took control of Korea, and began moving into Manchuria. Its only military alliance was with Great Britain, from 1902 to 1923. In the First World War, it joined the Entente powers, and seized many German possessions in the Pacific and in China.

The Greater East Asia Co-Prosperity Sphere in 1942

Although the political system was officially democratic, the Army increasingly seized control in Japan. In the 1920s, Japan contested Manchuria with the Soviet Union, invading it in 1931. It joined the Axis alliance with Germany, but there was little close cooperation between the two nations until 1943. Japan opened a full-scale war in China in 1937, committing several war crimes. Two puppet regimes were nominally in charge in China and Manchuria. Military confrontations with the Soviet Union led Japan to sign a Neutrality Pact with the Soviet union. American, British, and Dutch economic and financial pressures resulted in the cut off of vitally needed oil supplies in 1941. Japan declared war, and in three months won multiple battles, as well as continuing the war with China. The Japanese economy could not support the large-scale war effort, especially with the rapid buildup of the American navy. By 1944, Japan was heavily on the defensive, as its Greater East Asia Co-prosperity Sphere collapsed, its navy was sunk, and American bombing started to devastate major Japanese cities. Japan surrendered following the atomic bombings of Hiroshima and Nagasaki and Soviet invasion of Manchuria.

Japan was a minor player in international affairs in the late 1940s, but its economy revived in part as a supply base for the Korean War. Non-involvement became the central focus of Japanese foreign policy, together with very rapid growth of its industrial exports. It retains very close relations with the United States, which provides it with military protection. South Korea, China, and other countries in the Western Pacific trade on a very large scale with Japan.

In 2008, China-Japan trade reached $266 billion, making them the top trading partners. However, historical issues, including Japanese war crimes and maritime disputes, have created tensions. Despite this, leaders from both countries have made efforts to improve their relations. In 2021, Japan hosted the Summer Olympics. Following the Russian invasion of Ukraine in 2022, Japan condemned it and implemented sanctions, including freezing assets and banning new investments and exports of high-tech goods. The conflict in Ukraine, along with threats from China and North Korea, led to a shift in Japan's security policy. Japan increased defense spending and announced a major shift in military policy, acquiring counterstrike capabilities and aiming to increase the defense budget to 2% of GDP by 2027.

== Meiji Restoration ==
Beginning with the Meiji Restoration of 1868, which established a new, centralized regime, Japan set out to "gather wisdom from all over the world" and embarked on an ambitious program of military, social, political, and economic reforms that transformed it within a generation into a modern nation-state and major world power. The Meiji oligarchy was aware of Western progress, and "learning missions" were sent abroad to absorb as much of it as possible. The Iwakura Mission, the most important one, was led by Iwakura Tomomi, Kido Takayoshi and Ōkubo Toshimichi, contained forty-eight members in total and spent two years (1871–73) touring the United States and Europe, studying every aspect of modern nations, such as government institutions, courts, prison systems, schools, the import-export business, factories, shipyards, glass plants, mines, and other enterprises. Upon returning, mission members called for domestic reforms that would help Japan catch up with the West.

European powers imposed a series of "unequal treaties" in the 1850s and 1860s that gave privileged roles to their nationals in specially designated treaty ports. Representative was the 1858 Treaty of Amity and Commerce with the United States, also called the "Harris Treaty." It opened the ports of Kanagawa and four other Japanese cities to trade, and provided for the exchange of diplomats. It granted extraterritoriality to foreigners, so that they governed themselves and were not under the control of Japanese courts or authorities. There were numerous trading stipulations favorable to the Americans. The Dutch, British and Russians quickly followed suit with their own treaties, backed up by their own powerful naval forces. The unequal treaties were part of the series imposed on non-Western countries, such as Persia 1857, Turkey 1861, Siam 1855, and China 1858. The inequality was not quite as severe as suffered by these other countries, but it rankled so much that ending the inequality became a priority that was finally achieved in the 1890s. The humiliation was not as bad as China suffered, but it energized anti-foreign forces inside Japan. On the other hand, the new treaties, provided for tariffs on imports from Europe; imports multiplied by a factor of nine between 1860 and 1864, and the tariff revenue provided major financial backing for the Meiji regime. Exports of tea, silk and other Japanese products multiplied by a factor of four in four years, dramatically stimulating the local economy while causing galloping inflation that drove up the price of rice. The Meiji leaders sketched a new vision for a modernized Japan's leadership role in Asia, but they realized that this role required that Japan develop its national strength, cultivate Japanese nationalism among the population, and carefully craft policies toward potential enemies. The skills and tricks of negotiation had to be learned, so they could compete on an equal basis with experienced Western diplomats. No longer could Westerners be seen as "barbarians"; In time, Japan formed a corps of professional diplomats and negotiators.

== Later Meiji and Taishō eras ==
Starting in the 1860s Japan rapidly modernized along Western lines, adding industry, bureaucracy, institutions and military capabilities that provided the base for imperial expansion into Korea, China, Taiwan and islands to the south. It saw itself vulnerable to aggressive Western imperialism unless it took control of neighboring areas. It took control of Okinawa and Formosa. Japan's desire to control Taiwan, Korea and Manchuria, led to the first Sino-Japanese War with China in 1894–1895 and the Russo-Japanese War with Russia in 1904–1905. The war with China made Japan the world's first Eastern, modern imperial power, and the war with Russia proved that a Western power could be defeated by an Eastern state. The aftermath of these two wars left Japan the dominant power in the Far East with a sphere of influence extending over southern Manchuria and Korea, which was formally annexed as part of the Japanese Empire in 1910.

=== Okinawa ===
Okinawa island is the largest of the Ryukyu Islands, and paid tribute to China from the late 14th century. Japan took control of the entire Ryukyu island chain in 1609 and formally incorporated it into Japan in 1879.

=== War with China ===
Friction between China and Japan arose from the 1870s from Japan's control over the Ryukyu Islands, rivalry for political influence in Korea and trade issues. Japan, having built up a stable political and economic system with a small but well-trained army and navy, easily defeated China in the First Sino-Japanese War of 1894. Japanese soldiers massacred the Chinese after capturing Port Arthur on the Liaotung Peninsula. In the harsh Treaty of Shimonoseki of April 1895, China recognize the independence of Korea, and ceded to Japan Formosa, the Pescadores Islands, and the Liaotung Peninsula. China further paid an indemnity of 200 million silver taels, opened five new ports to international trade, and allowed Japan (and other Western powers) to set up and operate factories in these cities. However, Russia, France, and Germany saw themselves disadvantaged by the treaty and in the Triple Intervention forced Japan to return the Liaotung Peninsula in return for a larger indemnity. The only positive result for China came when those factories led the industrialization of urban China, spinning off a local class of entrepreneurs and skilled mechanics.

=== Taiwan ===
The island of Formosa (Taiwan) had an indigenous population when Dutch traders in need of an Asian base to trade with Japan and China arrived in 1623. The Dutch East India Company (VOC) built Fort Zeelandia. They soon began to rule the natives. China took control in the 1660s, and sent in settlers. By the 1890s there were about 2.3 million Han Chinese and 200,000 members of indigenous tribes. After its victory in the First Sino-Japanese War in 1894–95, the peace treaty ceded the island to Japan. It was Japan's first colony.

Japan expected far more benefits from the occupation of Taiwan than the limited benefits it actually received. Japan realized that its home islands could only support a limited resource base, and it hoped that Taiwan, with its fertile farmlands, would make up the shortage. By 1905, Taiwan was producing rice and sugar and paying for itself with a small surplus. Perhaps more important, Japan gained Asia-wide prestige by being the first non-European country to operate a modern colony. It learned how to adjust its German-based bureaucratic standards to actual conditions, and how to deal with frequent insurrections. The ultimate goal was to promote Japanese language and culture, but the administrators realized they first had to adjust to the Chinese culture of the people. Japan had a civilizing mission, and it opened schools so that the peasants could become productive and patriotic manual workers. Medical facilities were modernized, and the death rate plunged. To maintain order, Japan installed a police state that closely monitored everyone. In 1945, Japan was stripped of its empire and Taiwan was returned to China.

=== War with Russia 1904–1905 ===
In 1895, Japan felt robbed of the spoils of her decisive victory over China by the Western Powers (including Russia), which revised the Treaty of Shimonoseki. The Boxer Rebellion of 1899–1901 saw Japan and Russia as allies who fought together against the Chinese, with Russians playing the leading role on the battlefield.

In the 1890s Japan was angered at Russian encroachment on its plans to create a sphere of influence in Korea and Manchuria. Japan offered to recognize Russian dominance in Manchuria in exchange for recognition of Korea as being within the Japanese sphere of influence. Russia refused and demanded Korea north of the 39th parallel to be a neutral buffer zone between Russia and Japan. The Japanese government decided on war to stop the perceived Russian threat to its plans for expansion into Asia. After negotiations broke down in 1904, the Japanese Navy opened hostilities by attacking the Russian Eastern Fleet at Port Arthur, China, in a surprise attack. Russia suffered multiple defeats by Japan. Tsar Nicholas II kept on with the expectation that Russia would win decisive naval battles, and when that proved illusory he fought to preserve the dignity of Russia by averting a "humiliating peace". The war concluded with the Treaty of Portsmouth, mediated by US President Theodore Roosevelt. The complete victory of the Japanese military surprised world observers. The consequences transformed the balance of power in East Asia, resulting in a reassessment of Japan's recent entry onto the world stage. It was the first major military victory in the modern era of an Asian power over a European one.

=== Takeover of Korea ===
In 1905, the Empire of Japan and the Korean Empire signed the Eulsa Treaty, which brought Korea into the Japanese sphere of influence as a protectorate. The Treaty was a result of the Japanese victory in the Russo-Japanese War and Japan wanting to increase its hold over the Korean Peninsula. The Eulsa Treaty led to the signing of the 1907 Treaty two years later. The 1907 Treaty ensured that Korea would act under the guidance of a Japanese resident general and Korean internal affairs would be under Japanese control. Korean Emperor Gojong was forced to abdicate in favour of his son, Sunjong, as he protested Japanese actions in the Hague Conference. Finally in 1910, the Annexation Treaty was signed, formally annexing Korea to Japan.

== Political leaders ==
=== Prime Minister Ito ===
Prince Itō Hirobumi (1841–1909) was prime minister for most of the period 1885–1901 and dominated foreign policy. He strengthened diplomatic ties with Western powers including Germany, the United States and especially Great Britain through the Anglo-Japanese Alliance of 1905. In Asia he oversaw the short, victorious war against China 1894–95. He negotiated Chinese surrender on terms aggressively favourable to Japan, including the annexation of Taiwan and the release of Korea from the Chinese tribute system. He also gained control of the Liaodong Peninsula with Darien and Port Arthur, but was immediately forced by Russia, Germany and France acting together in the Triple Intervention to give that back to China. In the Anglo-Japanese Treaty of Commerce and Navigation of 1894, he succeeded in removing some of the onerous unequal treaty clauses that had plagued Japanese foreign relations since the start of the Meiji period. His major breakthrough was the Anglo-Japanese Alliance signed in 1902. It was a diplomatic milestone, it saw an end to Britain's splendid isolation. The alliance was renewed and expanded in scope twice, in 1905 and 1911, before its demise in 1921. It was officially terminated in 1923.

Itō sought to avoid a Russo-Japanese War through the policy of Man-Kan kōkan – surrendering Manchuria to the Russian sphere of influence in exchange for the acceptance of Japanese hegemony in Korea. A diplomatic tour of the United States and Europe brought him to Saint Petersburg in November 1901, where he was unable to find compromise on this matter with Russian authorities. Soon the government of Katsura Tarō elected to abandon the pursuit of Man-Kan kōkan, and tensions with Russia continued to escalate towards war.

=== Prime Minister Katsura Tarō ===
Prince Katsura Tarō (1848–1913) was an unpopular prime minister in his three terms stretching off and on from 1901 to 1911. During his first term (1901–1906) Japan emerged as a major imperialist power in East Asia. In terms of foreign affairs, it was marked by the Anglo-Japanese Alliance of 1902 and victory over Russia in the Russo-Japanese War of 1904–1905. During his tenure, the Taft–Katsura agreement with the U.S. acknowledged Japanese hegemony over Korea. His second term (1908–1911) was noteworthy for the Japan–Korea Annexation Treaty of 1910.

=== Prince Tokugawa Iesato ===
Prince Tokugawa Iesato (1863-1940) was very much the leading diplomatic representative of Japan when it came international relations during the first four decades of the twentieth century. He and his allies supported a peace and democracy movement. Prince Tokugawa represented Japan at the Washington Naval Conference, promoting an international arms limitation treaty.

== 1910–1941 ==
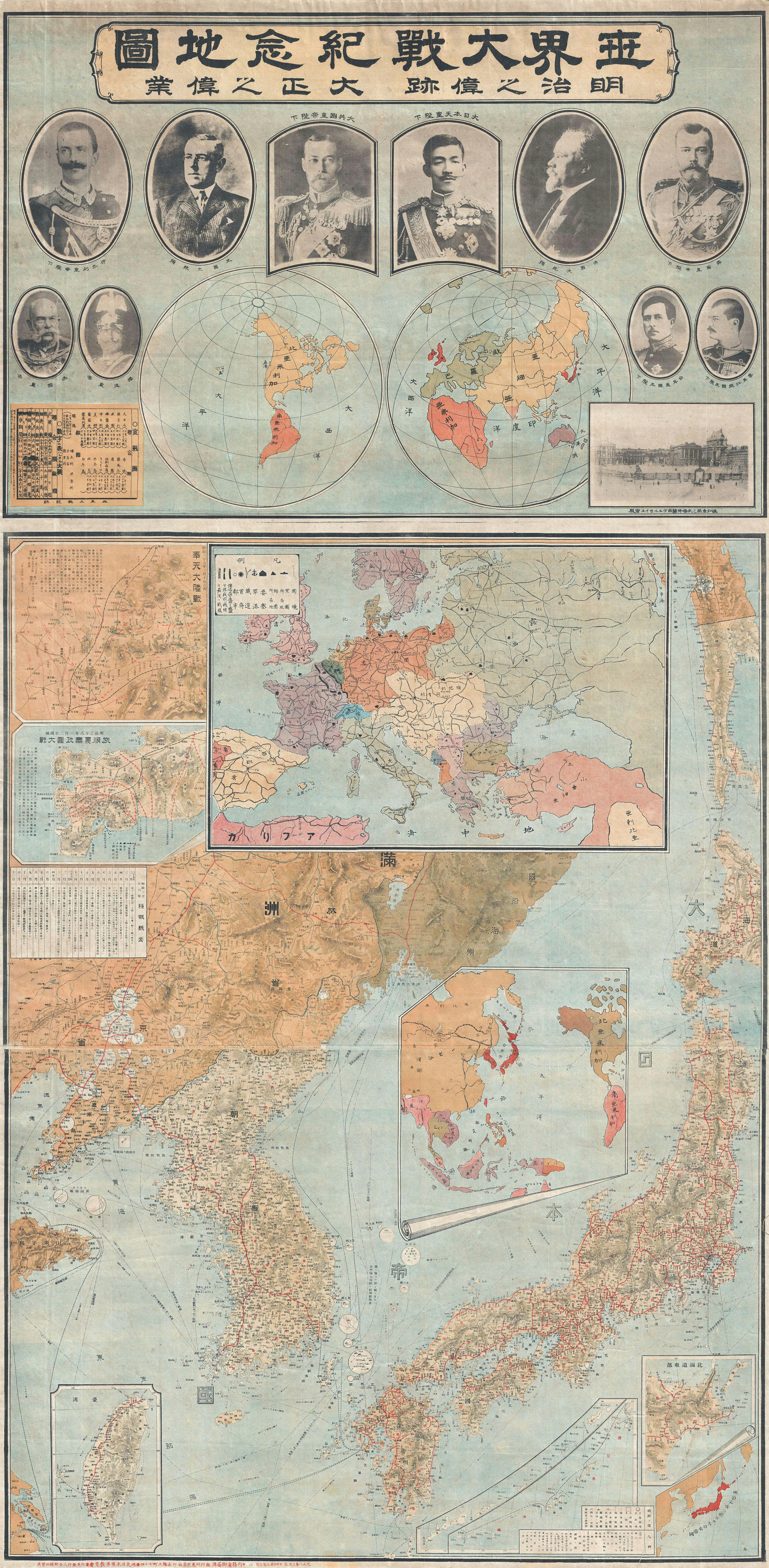
Japanese propaganda map from 1918, celebrating achievements made in the First World War and the Russo-Japanese War

The Japanese modelled their industrial economy closely on the most advanced Western European models. They started with textiles, railways, and shipping, expanding to electricity and machinery. The most serious weakness was a shortage of raw materials. Industry ran short of copper and coal became a net importer. A deep flaw in the strategy of aggressive military expansion was a heavy dependence on imports including for 100 percent of the aluminum, 85 percent of the iron ore, and 79 percent of the oil Japan's economy depended on. It was one thing to go to war with China or Russia, but quite another to be in conflict with key suppliers of raw materials such as the United States, Great Britain and the Netherlands, who supplied a majority of Japan's oil and iron.

=== World War I ===
Japan joined the Allies of the First World War hoping to share in the spoils following victory. Japan made modest territorial gains by conquering Imperial Germany's scattered possessions in the Pacific and China on behalf of the Allied cause however the Entente states pushed back hard against Japan's attempt to dominate China through the Twenty-One Demands of 1915. Its occupation of Siberia proved unproductive. Japan's wartime diplomacy and limited military action ultimately produced few long term results. At the Paris Peace Conference in 1919, Japanese requests for a recognition of racial equality amongst the victorious member states was rejected. Following the conclusion of the war, Japan began to sink increasingly into diplomatic isolation. The 1902 alliance with Britain was not renewed in 1922 because of heavy pressure on Britain from Canada and the United States. In the 1920s Japanese diplomacy was rooted in a largely liberal democratic political system, and favored internationalism. By the mid-1930s, however, Japan was rapidly reversing, rejecting democracy at home, as the Army seized more and more power, and rejecting internationalism and liberalism. By the late 1930s Japan was building closer and closer ties with Nazi Germany and Fascist Italy.

Japan put heavy pressure on China in 1915, especially in the Twenty-One Demands. The U.S. helped China push back, thus moderating the pressure. As the Russian pro-Allied state collapsed into Bolshevik central control and multiple civil wars on the Russian periphery, the Allies deployed forces into Russian territory hoping to bolster the Anti-Communist factions. The United States sent 8,000 troops to Siberia, and Japan sent 80,000. Japan's goal was less about focused on aiding the Allies cause as it was to ultimately take control of the trans-Siberian Railroad, and adjacent properties, giving it massive control over Manchuria. The Americans, originally focused their efforts to help Czechoslovak prisoners escape, increasingly, found their role was to watch and block Japanese expansion. Both nations withdrew their troops in 1920, as Lenin's Bolsheviks solidified their control over Russia.

At the Paris Peace Conference in 1919, Japan was awarded a League of Nations mandate over a number of smaller islands and territory that had previously been part of the German Empire. Japan was disappointed when its draft resolution condemning racism in international affairs, was dropped from the agenda. However, its main demand, which it pursued relentlessly, was to obtain permanent control of Germany's holdings in Shantung, China, which Japan captured early in the war. China protested furiously, but had little leverage. The Shandong Problem appeared initially to be a Japanese victory, but Tokyo soon had second thoughts as widespread protests inside China led to the May Fourth Movement led by angry radical students. Finally in 1922, following mediation by the U.S. and Great Britain, Japan was forced to return Shantung to China.

=== 1920s ===
A sort of rapprochement took place between Washington and Tokyo, although there were still philosophical differences in their approaches. The Japanese operated in terms of traditional Power diplomacy, emphasizing control over distinct spheres of influence, while the United States adhered to Wilsonianism based on the "open door" and internationalist principles. Both sides compromised, and were successful in diplomatic endeavors such as the naval limitations at the Washington conference in 1922. The conference set a naval ratio for capital warships of 5:5:3 among the United States, Britain and Japan. The result was a de-escalation of the naval arms race for a decade. Japan was outraged at the racism inherent in the 1924 American immigration laws, which reduced the long-standing Japanese quota of 100 immigrants annually to zero. Japan was likewise annoyed at similar restrictions imposed by Canada and Australia. Britain, responding to anti-Japanese sentiment in its Commonwealth, and in the United States, did not renew its two-decade-old treaty with Japan in 1923.

In 1930, the London disarmament conference angered the Japanese Army and Navy. Japan's navy demanded parity with the United States and Britain, but was rejected and the conference kept the 1921 ratios. Japan was required to scrap a capital ship. Extremists assassinated Japan's prime minister and the military took more power, leading to the rapid decline in democracy.

==== Japanese invasion of Manchuria ====
In September 1931, the Japanese Army—acting on its own without government approval—seized control of Manchuria, an anarchic area that China had not controlled in decades. It set up a puppet government of Manchukuo. Britain and France sponsored a League of Nations investigation. It issued the Lytton Report in 1932, saying that Japan had genuine grievances, but it acted illegally in seizing the entire province. Japan quit the League; Britain took no action. The United States issued the Stimson Doctrine, announcing that it would not recognize Japan's conquest as legitimate. The short-term impact was slight, but the long-term impact set the stage for American support for China against Japan in the late 1930s.

The civilian government in Tokyo tried to minimize the Army's aggression in Manchuria, and announced it was withdrawing. On the contrary, the Army completed the conquest of Manchuria, and the civilian cabinet resigned. The political parties were divided on the issue of military expansion. The new Prime Minister Inukai Tsuyoshi tried to negotiate with China, but was assassinated in the May 15 Incident in 1932, which ushered in an era of ultranationalism led by the Army and supported by patriotic societies. It ended civilian rule in Japan until after 1945.

The Army, however, was itself divided into cliques and factions with different strategic viewpoints. One faction saw The Soviet Union as the main enemy, the other sought to build a mighty empire based in Manchuria and northern China. The Navy, while smaller and less influential, was also factionalized. Large-scale warfare, known as the Second Sino-Japanese War, began in August 1937, with naval and infantry attacks focused on Shanghai, which quickly spread to other major cities. There were numerous large-scale atrocities against Chinese civilians, such as the Nanking Massacre in December 1937, with mass murder and mass rape. By 1939 military lines had stabilized, with Japan in control of the almost all of the major Chinese cities and industrial areas. A puppet government was set up. Meanwhile, the Japanese Army fared badly in large battles with Soviet forces in Mongolia at Battles of Khalkhin Gol in summer 1939. The USSR was too powerful. Tokyo and Moscow signed a nonaggression treaty in April 1941, as the militarists turned their attention to the European colonies to the south which had urgently needed oil fields.

=== Army's role ===
The Army increasingly took control of the government, assassinated opposing leaders, suppressed the left, and promoted a highly aggressive foreign policy with respect to China. Japanese policy angered the United States, Britain, France, and the Netherlands. Japanese nationalism was the primary inspiration, coupled with a disdain for democracy. The extreme right became influential throughout the Japanese government and society, notably within the Kwantung Army, which was stationed in Manchuria along the Japanese-owned South Manchuria Railroad. During the Manchurian Incident of 1931, radical army officers conquered Manchuria from local officials and set up the puppet government of Manchukuo there without permission from the Japanese government. International criticism of Japan following the invasion led to Japan withdrawing from the League of Nations.

Japan's expansionist vision grew increasingly bold. Many of Japan's political elite aspired to have Japan acquire new territory for resource extraction and settlement of surplus population. These ambitions led to the outbreak of the Second Sino-Japanese War in 1937. After their victory in the Chinese capital, the Japanese military committed the infamous Nanking Massacre. The Japanese military failed to destroy the Chinese government led by Chiang Kai-shek, which retreated to remote areas. The conflict was a stalemate that lasted until 1945. Japan's war aim was to establish the Greater East Asia Co-Prosperity Sphere, a vast pan-Asian union under Japanese domination. Hirohito's role in Japan's foreign wars remains a subject of controversy, with various historians portraying him as either a powerless figurehead or an enabler and supporter of Japanese militarism. The United States grew increasingly worried about the Philippines, an American colony, within close range of Japan and started looking for ways to contain Japanese expansion.

== World War II ==
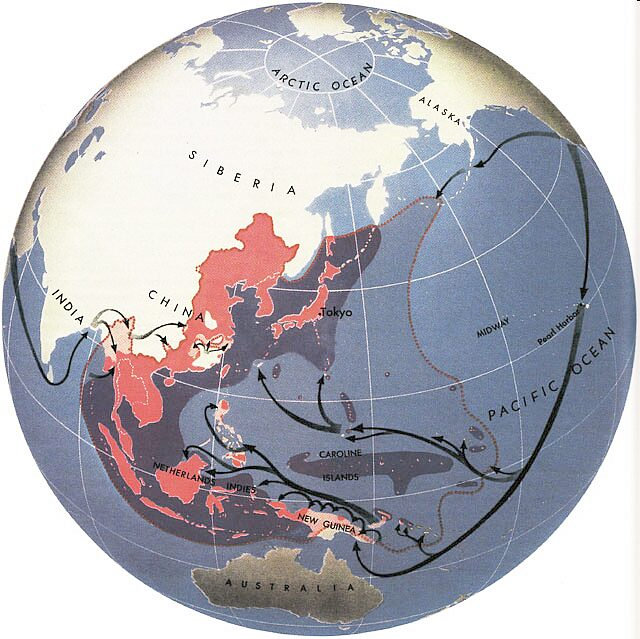
American attack lines against Japan, 1942–1945

American public and elite opinion—including even the isolationists—strongly opposed Japan's invasion of China in 1937. President Roosevelt imposed increasingly stringent economic sanctions intended to deprive Japan of the oil and steel it needed to continue its war in China. Japan reacted by forging an alliance with Germany and Italy in 1940, known as the Tripartite Pact, which worsened its relations with the US. In July 1941, the United States, Great Britain, and the Netherlands froze all Japanese assets and cut off oil shipments—Japan had little oil of its own.

Japan had conquered all of Manchuria and most of coastal China by 1939, but the Allies refused to recognize the conquests and stepped up their commitment. President Franklin Roosevelt arranged for American pilots and ground crews to set up an aggressive Chinese Air Force nicknamed the Flying Tigers that would not only defend against Japanese air power but also start bombing the Japanese islands. Diplomacy provided very little space for the adjudication of the deep differences between Japan and the United States. The United States was firmly and almost unanimously committed to defending the integrity of China. The isolationism that characterized the strong opposition of many Americans toward war in Europe did not apply to Asia. Japan had no friends in the United States, nor in Great Britain, nor the Netherlands. The United States had not yet declared war on Germany, but was closely collaborating with Britain and the Netherlands regarding the Japanese threat. United States started to move its newest B-17 heavy bombers to bases in the Philippines, well within range of Japanese cities. The goal was deterrence of any Japanese attacks to the south. Furthermore, plans were well underway to ship American air forces to China, where American pilots in Chinese uniforms flying American warplanes, were preparing to bomb Japanese cities well before Pearl Harbor. Great Britain, although realizing it could not defend Hong Kong, was confident in its abilities to defend its major base in Singapore and the surrounding Malaya Peninsula. When the war did start in December 1941, Australian soldiers were rushed to Singapore, weeks before Singapore surrendered, and all the Australian and British forces were sent to prisoner of war camps. The Netherlands, with its homeland overrun by Germany, had a small Navy to defend the Dutch East Indies. Their role was to delay the Japanese invasion long enough to destroy the oil wells, drilling equipment, refineries and pipelines that were the main target of Japanese attacks.

Decisions in Tokyo were controlled by the Army, and then rubber-stamped by Emperor Hirohito; the Navy also had a voice. However, the civilian government and diplomats were largely ignored. The Army saw the conquest of China as its primary mission, but operations in Manchuria had created a long border with the Soviet Union. Informal, large-scale military confrontations with the Soviet forces at Nomonhan in summer 1939 demonstrated that the Soviets possessed a decisive military superiority. Even though it would help Germany's war against Russia after June 1941, the Japanese army refused to go north. The Japanese realized the urgent need for oil, over 90% of which was supplied by the United States, Britain and the Netherlands. From the Army's perspective, a secure fuel supply was essential for the warplanes, tanks and trucks—as well as the Navy's warships and warplanes of course. The solution was to send the Navy south, to seize the oilfields in the Dutch East Indies and nearby British colonies. Some admirals and many civilians, including Prime Minister Konoe Fumimaro, believed that a war with the U.S. would end in defeat. The alternative was loss of honor and power. While the admirals were also dubious about their long-term ability to confront the American and British navies, they hoped that a knockout blow destroying the American fleet at Pearl Harbor would bring the enemy to the negotiating table for a favorable outcome. Japanese diplomats were sent to Washington in summer 1941 to engage in high-level negotiations. However, they did not speak for the Army leadership that made the decisions. By early October both sides realized that no compromises were possible between the Japan's commitment to conquer China, and America's commitment to defend China. Japan's civilian government fell and the Army took full control, bent on war.

=== Imperial conquests ===
Japan launched several quick wars in East Asia, and they all worked. In 1937, the Japanese Army invaded and captured most of the coastal Chinese cities such as Shanghai. Japan took over French Indochina (Vietnam, Laos, Cambodia) in 1940–41. After declaring war on the U.S., Britain and the Netherlands in December 1941, it quickly conquered British Malaya (Brunei, Malaysia, Singapore) as well as the Dutch East Indies (Indonesia). Thailand managed to stay independent by becoming a satellite state of Japan. In December 1941 to May 1942, Japan sank major elements of the American, British and Dutch fleets, captured Hong Kong, Singapore, the Philippines and the Dutch East Indies, and reached the borders of India and began bombing Australia. Japan suddenly had achieved its goal of ruling the Greater East Asia Co-Prosperity Sphere.

=== Imperial rule ===
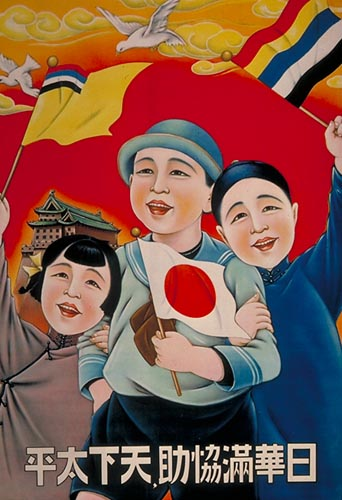
1935 poster of the puppet state of Manchukuo promoting harmony among peoples. The caption reads: "With the help of Japan, China, and Manchukuo, the world can be in peace."

The ideology of Japan's colonial empire, as it expanded dramatically during the war, contained two contradictory impulses. On the one hand, it preached the unity of the Co-Prosperity Sphere, a coalition of Asian races, directed by Japan, against Western imperialism. This approach celebrated the spiritual values of the East in opposition to the "crass" materialism of the West. In practice, it was a euphemistic title for grabbing land and acquiring essential natural resources. The Japanese installed organizationally minded bureaucrats and engineers to run their new empire, and they believed in ideals of efficiency, modernization, and engineering solutions to social problems. Economist Akamatsu Kaname (1896–1974) devised the "Flying geese paradigm" in the late 1930s that provided a model of imperialistic economic behavior. Japan (the lead goose) would specialize in high technology, high-value manufacturing. It would purchase food, cotton, and iron ore at artificially low prices from the trailing Co-Prosperity Sphere geese, and sell them high-priced final products such as chemicals, fertilizers, and machinery. These dealings were carried out by the powerful zaibatsu corporations and supervised by the Japanese government. The Flying geese paradigm was revived after 1950 and was given credit for the rapid economic growth of Japan's East Asia trading partners.

The Imperial Japanese Army operated ruthless governments in most of the conquered areas, but paid more favorable attention to the Dutch East Indies. The main goal was to obtain oil, but Japan sponsored an Indonesian nationalist movement under Sukarno. Sukarno finally came to power in the late 1940s after several years of battling the Dutch. The Dutch destroyed their oil wells but the Japanese reopened them. However most of the tankers taking oil to Japan were sunk by American submarines, so Japan's oil shortage became increasingly acute.

==== Puppet states in China ====
Japan set up puppet regimes in Manchuria ("Manchukuo") and China proper; they vanished at the end of the war.

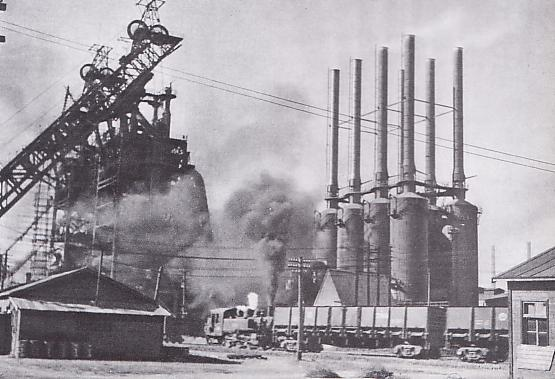
Shōwa Steel Works was a mainstay of the Economy of Manchukuo

Manchuria, the historic homeland of the Manchu dynasty, had an ambiguous character after 1912. It was run by local warlords. The Japanese Army seized control in 1931, and set up a puppet state of Manchukuo in 1932 for the 34,000,000 inhabitants. Other areas were added, and over 800,000 Japanese moved in as administrators. The nominal ruler was Puyi, who as a small child had been the last Emperor of China. He was deposed during the revolution of 1911, and now the Japanese brought him back in a powerless role. Only Axis countries recognized Manchukuo. The United States in 1932 announced the Stimson Doctrine stating that it would never recognize Japanese sovereignty. Japan modernized the economy and operated it as a satellite to the Japanese economy. It was out of range of American bombers, so its factories were expanded and continued their output to the end. Manchukuo was returned to China in 1945. When Japan seized control of China proper in 1937–38, the Japanese Central China Expeditionary Army set up the Reorganized National Government of China, a puppet state, under the nominal leadership of Wang Ching-wei (1883–1944). It was based in Nanjing. The Japanese were in full control; the puppet state declared war on the Allies in 1943. Wang was allowed to administer the International Settlement in Shanghai. The puppet state had an army of 900,000 soldiers, and was positioned against the Nationalist army under Chiang Kai-shek. It did little fighting.

== 1945–1990s ==
=== American Occupation ===
The Americans under General Douglas MacArthur were in ultimate command of Japanese affairs 1945–51. The other allies and former colonial possessions of Japan demanded revenge, but MacArthur operated a highly favorable system in which harsh measures were limited to war criminals, who were tried and executed. Japan lacked sovereignty and had no diplomatic relations—its people were not allowed to travel abroad. MacArthur worked to democratize Japan along the lines of the American New Deal, with the destruction of militarism and monopolistic corporations, and the inculcation of democratic values and electoral practices. MacArthur worked well with Emperor Hirohito, who was kept on the throne as a symbolic constitutional ruler. In practice, the actual administration of national and government was handled by the Japanese themselves under Prime Minister Yoshida Shigeru. His policy, known as the Yoshida Doctrine was to focus Japanese energies on rebuilding the economy, while relying entirely on the United States to handle defense and foreign policy generally. Yoshida shared and implemented MacArthur's goals was to democratize Japanese political, social and economic institutions, while completely de-militarizing the nation and renouncing its militaristic heritage.

MacArthur ordered a limited rearmament of Japan the week after the war broke out in June 1950, calling for a national police reserve of 75,000 men, which would be organized separately from the 125,000 police force that already existed. The Coast Guard grew from 10,000 to 18,000. The argument that these were police forces for domestic internal use carried the day over the objections of the anti-militarists. However, Washington envisioned a quasi-military force that would use military equipment on loan from the United States. Japan now had a small army of its own. Japan became the logistical base for the American and allied forces fighting in Korea, with a surge in orders for goods and services that jump-started the economy.

The occupation culminated in the Peace Treaty of 1951, signed by Japan, the United States, and 47 other involved nations, not including the Soviet Union or either Chinese government. The occupation officially ended in April 1952. American diplomat John Foster Dulles was in charge of drafting the peace treaty. He had been deeply involved in 1919, when severe reparations and the guilt clause was imposed against Germany at the Paris Peace Conference. Dulles thought that was a terrible mistake that energized the far right and the Nazis in Germany, and he made sure it never happened again. Japan was therefore not obligated to pay reparations to anyone.

=== "Economic Miracle" of 1950s ===
From 1950 onward, Japan rebuilt itself politically and economically. The U.S. and its allies used Japan as their logistics base during the Korean War (1950–53), which poured money into the economy. Historian Yone Sugita finds that "the 1950s was a decade during which Japan formulated a unique corporate capitalist system in which government, business, and labor implemented close and intricate cooperation".

Japan's newfound economic power soon gave it far more dominance than it ever had militarily. The Yoshida Doctrine and the Japanese government's economic intervention, spurred on an economic miracle on par with that of West Germany a few years earlier. The Japanese government strove to spur industrial development through a mix of protectionism and trade expansion. The establishment of the Ministry of International Trade and Industry (MITI) was instrumental in the Japanese post-war economic recovery. By 1954, the MITI system was in full effect. It coordinated industry and government action and fostered cooperative arrangements, and sponsored research to develop promising exports as well as imports for which substitutes would be sought (especially dyestuffs, iron and steel, and soda ash). Yoshida's successor, Hayato Ikeda, began implementing economic policies which removed much of Japan's anti-monopoly laws. Foreign companies were locked out of the Japanese market and strict protectionist laws were enacted.

Meanwhile, the United States under President Eisenhower saw Japan as the economic anchor for Western Cold War policy in Asia. Japan was completely demilitarized and did not contribute to military power, but did provide the economic power. The US and UN forces used Japan as their forward logistics base during the Korean War (1950–53), and orders for supplies flooded Japan. The close economic relationship strengthened the political and diplomatic ties, so that the two nations survived a political crisis in 1960 involving left-wing opposition to the U.S.-Japan Security Treaty. The left failed to force the removal of large American military bases in Japan, especially on Okinawa. Shimizu argues that the American policy of creating "people of plenty" was a success in Japan and reached its goal of defusing anti-capitalist protest on the left.

In 1968 Japan's economy surpassed West Germany to become the second-largest economic power in the world after the United States. Japan ascended to great power status again. It kept the 2nd biggest economy position until 2011, when the economy of China surpassed it.

Japan's dealing with its war legacy strained relations with China and Korea. Japanese officials and emperors have made over 50 formal war apologies since the 1950s. However, some politicians of China and Korea found the official apologies, such as those of the Emperor in 1990 and the Murayama Statement of 1995, inadequate or insincere. Nationalist politics have exacerbated this, such as denial of the Nanjing Massacre and other war crimes, revisionist history textbooks, which provoked protests in East Asia. Japanese politicians make frequent visits to Yasukuni Shrine to commemorate the people who died in wars from 1868 to 1954, but convicted war criminals are among the enshrined.

== Since 2000 ==
China's and Japan's economies are respectively the world's second and third-largest economies by nominal GDP and the first and fourth-largest economies by GDP PPP. In 2008, China-Japan trade grew to $266.4 billion, a rise of 12.5 percent on 2007, making China and Japan the top two-way trading partners. China was also the biggest destination for Japanese exports in 2009. Since the end of World War II, Sino-Japanese relations are still mired with geopolitical disagreements. The enmity between these two countries emanated from the history of the Japanese war and the imperialism and maritime disputes in the East China Sea. Thus, although these two nations are close business partners, there is an undercurrent of tension, which leaders of both sides are trying to quell. Chinese and Japanese leaders have met several times face to face to try to build a cordial relationship between the two countries.

In 2020, Tokyo was due to host the Summer Olympics for the second time since 1964. Japan was the first Asian country to host the Olympics twice. However, due to the global outbreak and economic impact of COVID-19 pandemic, the Summer Olympics were postponed to 2021; they took place from 23 July to 8 August 2021. Japan ranked third place, with 27 gold medals.

When the 2022 Russian invasion of Ukraine began, Japan condemned and levied sanctions on Russia for its actions. Ukrainian President Volodymyr Zelenskyy praised Japan as the "first Asian nation that has begun exerting pressure on Russia." Japan froze the assets of Russia's central bank and other major Russian banks and assets owned by 500 Russian citizens and organizations. Japan banned new investments and the export of high tech to the country. Russia's trade status as favored nation was revoked. Japan's swift actions shows its becoming a leading power in the world. The war in Ukraine and threats from China and North Korea caused a shift in Japan's security policy with higher defense spending which erodes its former pacifist stance.

On December 16, 2022, Japan announced a major shift in its military policy by acquiring counterstrike capabilities and a defense budget increase to 2% of GDP (¥43 trillion ($315 billion) by 2027. The impetus are regional security concerns over China, North-Korea and Russia. This will leapfrog Japan from ninth to the world's third-largest defense spender, behind the United States and China.

== See also ==
- History of Japan
- Causes of World War II
- Cold War
  - History of Sino-Japanese relations, China
  - France–Japan relations
  - Germany–Japan relations
  - Greater East Asia Co-Prosperity Sphere, 1930–1945
  - History of Japan–Korea relations
  - Japanese foreign policy on Southeast Asia
  - Empire of Japan–Russian Empire relations to 1917
    - Japan–Soviet Union relations, 1917–1991
    - Japan–Russia relations, since 1991
  - Japan–United Kingdom relations
  - Japan–United States relations
