= Anglo-Japanese Alliance =

1902–1922 defence pact

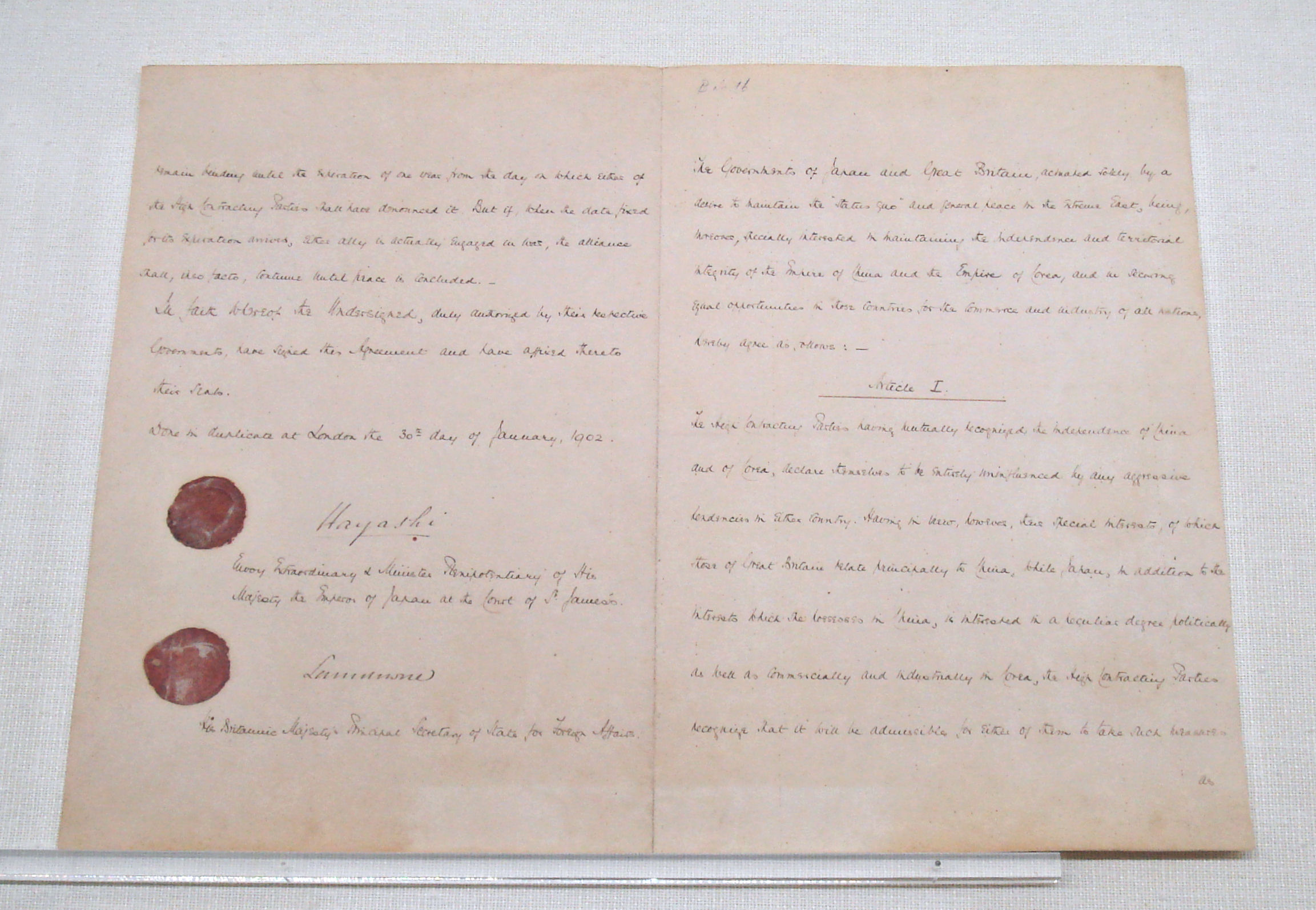
- Japanese copy of the alliance treaty
- Type: Military alliance
- Context: Anti-Russian Empire
- Signed: 30 January 1902
- Location: London, United Kingdom
- Effective: 31 January 1902
- Replaced by: Four-Power Pacific Treaty
- Expiration: 17 August 1923
- Original signatories: Lord Lansdowne, United Kingdom; (Empire of Japan) Count Hayashi Tadasu, Japan
- Parties: British Empire; Japanese Empire
- Languages: English; Japanese

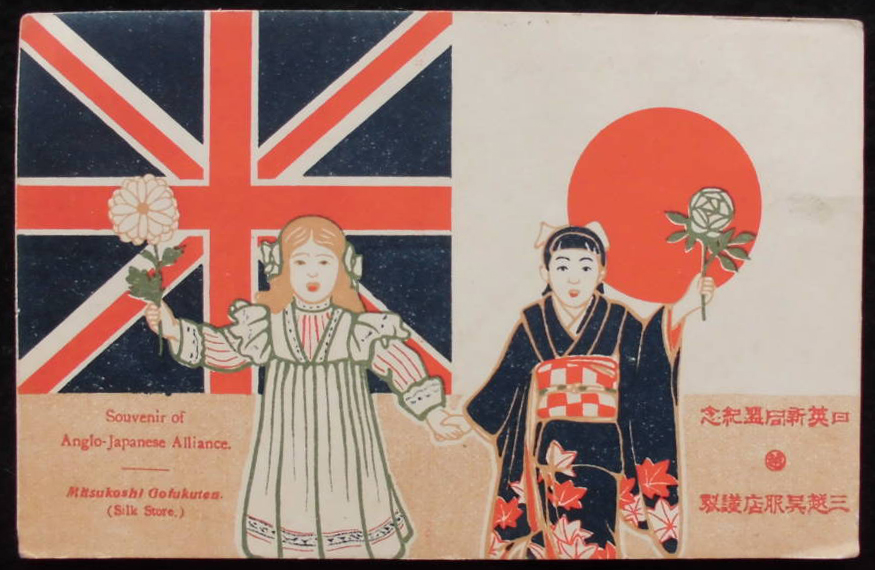
Commemorative postcard 1905

The Anglo-Japanese Alliance (日英同盟, Nichi-Ei Dōmei) was an alliance between the United Kingdom and the Empire of Japan which was effective from 1902 to 1923. The treaty creating the alliance was signed at Lansdowne House in London on 30 January 1902 by British foreign secretary Henry Petty-Fitzmaurice, 5th Marquess of Lansdowne and Japanese diplomat Hayashi Tadasu. After the preceding era of unequal treaties enforced on Asian countries including Japan, the alliance was a military pact concluded on more equal terms between a Western power and non-Western nation. It reflected the success of Meiji era reforms that modernized and industrialized Japan's economy, society and military, which enabled Japan to extract itself from the inferior position it had previously shared with other Asian countries like China, which had been subordinated to Western empires either through formal colonial acquisition or unequal treaties.

One shared motivation for the agreement was that a diplomatic alliance might deter other world powers that might otherwise encroach on British and Japanese imperial interests in Asia. For the British, the alliance marked the end of a period of "splendid isolation" while allowing for greater focus on protecting its rule over India and competing in the Anglo-German naval arms race, as part of a larger strategy to reduce imperial overcommitment and recall the Royal Navy to defend Britain. By contrast, it came at a time of Japan's ascendancy; Japan had not only successfully abrogated the unequal treaties it was previously subject to by the Western powers, but was now a fledging empire in its own right: Japan had imposed its own unequal treaty on Korea in 1876 and now controlled Formosa (Taiwan) as a colony, as Taiwan had been ceded by Qing China to Japan in the Treaty of Shimonoseki, after the First Sino-Japanese War. Consequently, Japan was now developing its own imperial sphere of influence, and felt that a conflict with Russia was imminent over rival ambitions in Manchuria and Korea, especially after the Triple Intervention in 1895, in which Russia, France, and Germany coerced Japan into relinquishing its claim on the Liaodong Peninsula. Article 3 of the alliance promised support if either signatory became involved in war with more than one power, and thus deterred France from assisting its ally Russia in the Russo-Japanese War of 1904–1905. Instead, France concluded the Entente Cordiale with Britain and limited its support of Russia to providing loans. Japan also gained international prestige from the alliance and used it as a foundation for their diplomacy for two decades, although the alliance angered the United States and some British dominions, whose opinion of Japan worsened and gradually became hostile.

After Japan's victory in the Russo-Japanese war and the resulting treaty that granted the Japanese control over Korea, the alliance was renewed in 1905 and 1911. In 1914, it enabled Japan's entry into World War I and capture of German-held territories in Asia. Britain grew increasingly distrustful of Japan over its Asian ambitions, and the alliance was ended with the signing of the Four-Power Treaty in 1921 and terminated upon its ratification in 1923.

== Motivations and reservations ==
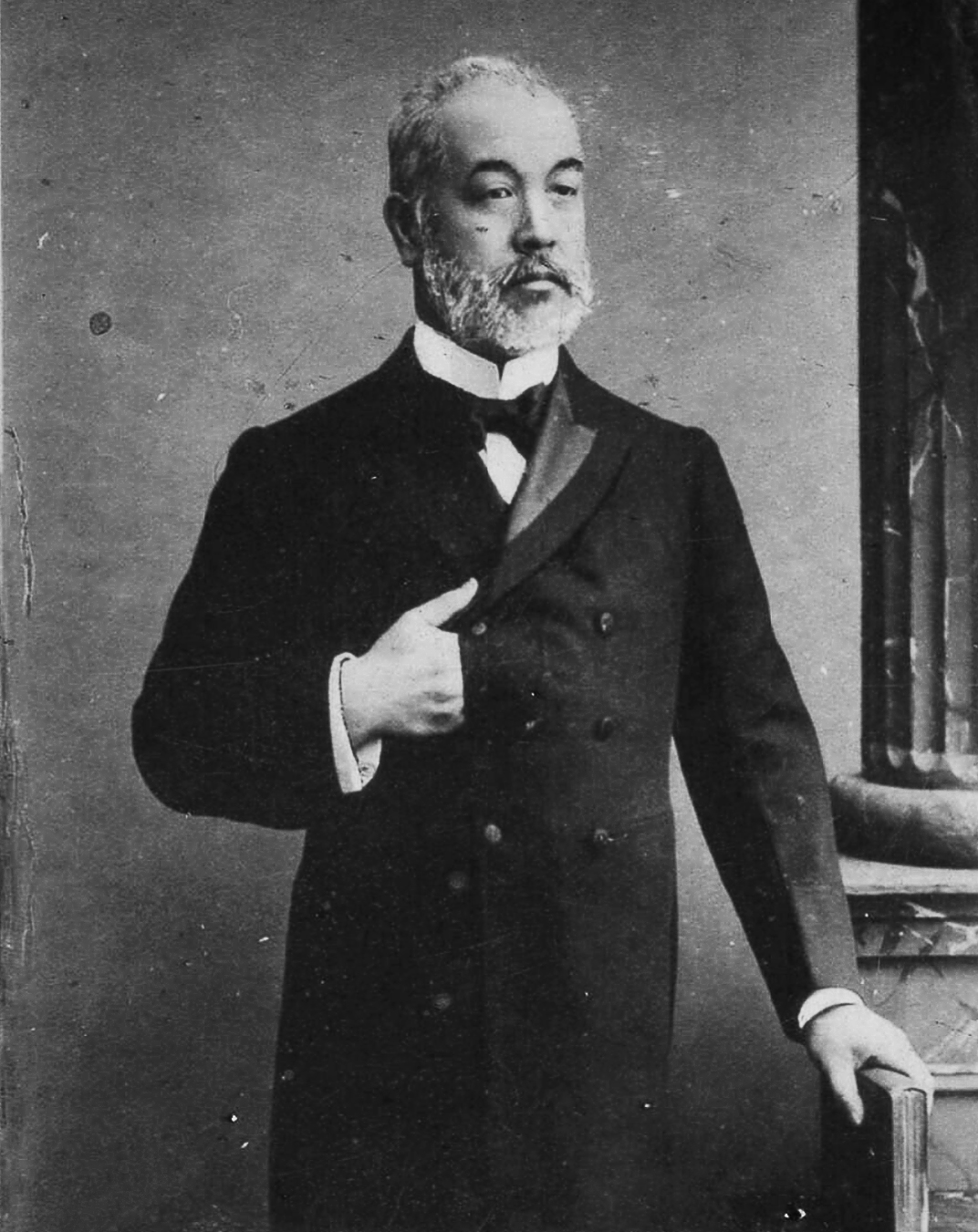
Hayashi Tadasu, (Note: As Envoy Extraordinary to the Court of St. James and Minister Plenipotentiary of the emperor, he held the authority to make state agreements effective immediately without the ratification by cabinet. For this reason, the signed document of this treaty and its revisions are called Anglo-Japanese Alliance ratification papers (日英同盟批准書, Nichi-Ei Dōmei Hijunsho) in Japan.) Japanese signatory of the alliance

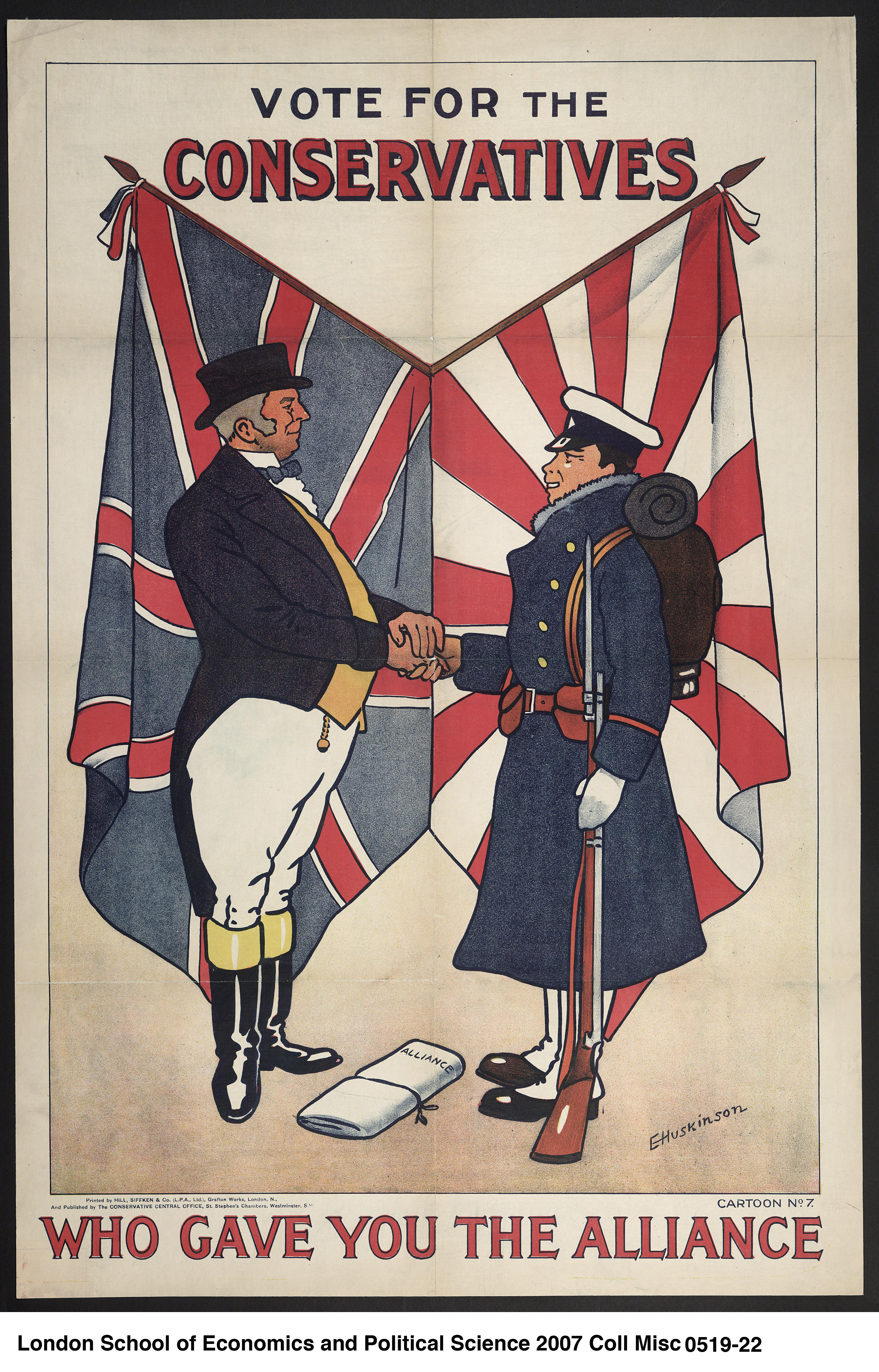
Illustration by E.Huskinson for the Conservative Party c. 1905–1910.

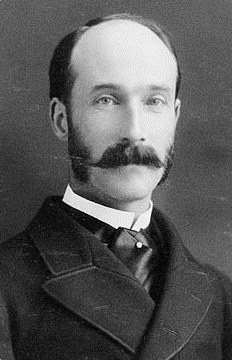
Lord Lansdowne, the British signatory

The possibility of an alliance between Great Britain and Japan had been canvassed since 1895, when Britain refused to join the Triple Intervention of France, Germany and Russia against the Japanese occupation of the Liaodong Peninsula. While this single event was an unstable basis for an alliance, the case was strengthened by the support Britain had given Japan in its drive towards modernisation and their co-operative efforts to put down the Boxer Rebellion. Newspapers of both countries voiced support for such an alliance; in Britain, Francis Brinkley of The Times and Edwin Arnold of The Daily Telegraph were the driving force behind such support, while in Japan the pro-alliance mood of politician Ōkuma Shigenobu stirred the Mainichi and Yomiuri newspapers into pro-alliance advocacy. The 1894 Anglo-Japanese Treaty of Commerce and Navigation had also paved the way for equal relations and the possibility of an alliance.

In the end, the common interest truly fuelling the alliance was opposition to Russian expansion, such as the invasion of Manchuria continuing after the Boxer Rebellion. This was made clear as early as the 1890s, when the British diplomat Cecil Spring Rice identified that Britain and Japan working in concert was the only way to challenge Russian power in the region. Negotiations began when Russia began to move into China. Nevertheless, both countries had their reservations. Britain was cautious about abandoning its policy of "splendid isolation", wary of antagonizing Russia, and unwilling to act on the treaty if Japan were to attack the United States. There were factions in the Japanese government that still hoped for a compromise with Russia, including the highly powerful political figure Hirobumi Itō, who had served four terms as Prime Minister of Japan. It was thought that friendship within Asia would be more amenable to the US, which was uncomfortable with the rise of Japan as a power. Furthermore, Britain was unwilling to protect Japanese interests in Korea and likewise, the Japanese were unwilling to support Britain in India.

Following the accession of Edward VII to the British throne in January 1901, Hayashi and Lansdowne began discussions that July, although disputes over Korea and India stalled them all the way into November. At this point, Itō requested a delay in negotiations in order to attempt a reconciliation with Russia. He found little appetite for such in Saint Petersburg, and with Britain expressing concerns about duplicity on Japan's part, Hayashi hurriedly re-entered negotiations. A workable treaty was agreed to in January of the same winter.

The treaty alliance represented the first on equal terms between Eastern and Western nations. For Britain, it also represented the end of its period of independence from foreign entanglements, and of its role as the world's only superpower, a policy shift soon reinforced within the next 5 years by the Anglo-French Entente Cordiale and Anglo-Russian Convention.

== Terms of the 1902 treaty ==
Punch cartoon (1905) accompanied by a quote from Rudyard Kipling that appeared in the British press after the treaty was renewed in 1905 illustrates the positive light that the alliance was seen in by the British public.

The treaty contained six articles:

Article 1

- The High Contracting parties, having mutually recognised the independence of China and Korea, declare themselves to be entirely uninfluenced by aggressive tendencies in either country, having in view, however, their special interests, of which those of Great Britain relate principally to China, whilst Japan, in addition to the interests which she possesses in China, is interested in a peculiar degree, politically as well as commercially and industrially in Korea, the High Contracting Parties recognise that it will be admissible for either of them to take such measures as may be indispensable in order to safeguard those interests if threatened either by the aggressive action of any other Power, or by disturbances arising in China or Korea, and necessitating the intervention of either of the High Contracting Parties for the protection of the lives and properties of its subjects.

Article 2

- Declaration of neutrality if either signatory becomes involved in war through Article 1.

Article 3

- Promise of support if either signatory becomes involved in war with more than one Power.

Article 4

- Signatories promise not to enter into separate agreements with other Powers to the prejudice of this alliance.

Article 5

- The signatories promise to communicate frankly and fully with each other when any of the interests affected by this treaty are in jeopardy.

Article 6

- Treaty to remain in force for five years and then at one years' notice, unless notice was given at the end of the fourth year.

Articles 2 and 3 were most crucial concerning war and mutual defense.

The treaty laid out an acknowledgment of Japanese interests in Korea without obligating Britain to help if a conflict arose where Japan only had one adversary. Japan was likewise not obligated to defend British interests unless there were two adversaries.

Although written using careful and clear language, the two sides understood the treaty slightly differently. Britain saw it as a gentle warning to Russia, while Japan was emboldened by it. From that point on, even those of a moderate stance refused to accept a compromise over the issue of Korea. Extremists saw it as an open invitation for imperial expansion, many in Japan having long desired a showdown with Russia. The provision on the involvement of more than one power (article 3) recalled the Triple Intervention by the Russian-French-German coalition in 1895, and strengthened Japan's hand both diplomatically and militarily against a potential European coalition.

This treaty was signed by Secretary of State for Foreign Affairs, Henry Petty-Fitzmaurice, 5th Marquess of Lansdowne, and Count Hayashi Tadasu on 30 January, effective 31 January 1902 for five years.

== Intelligence Agreements ==
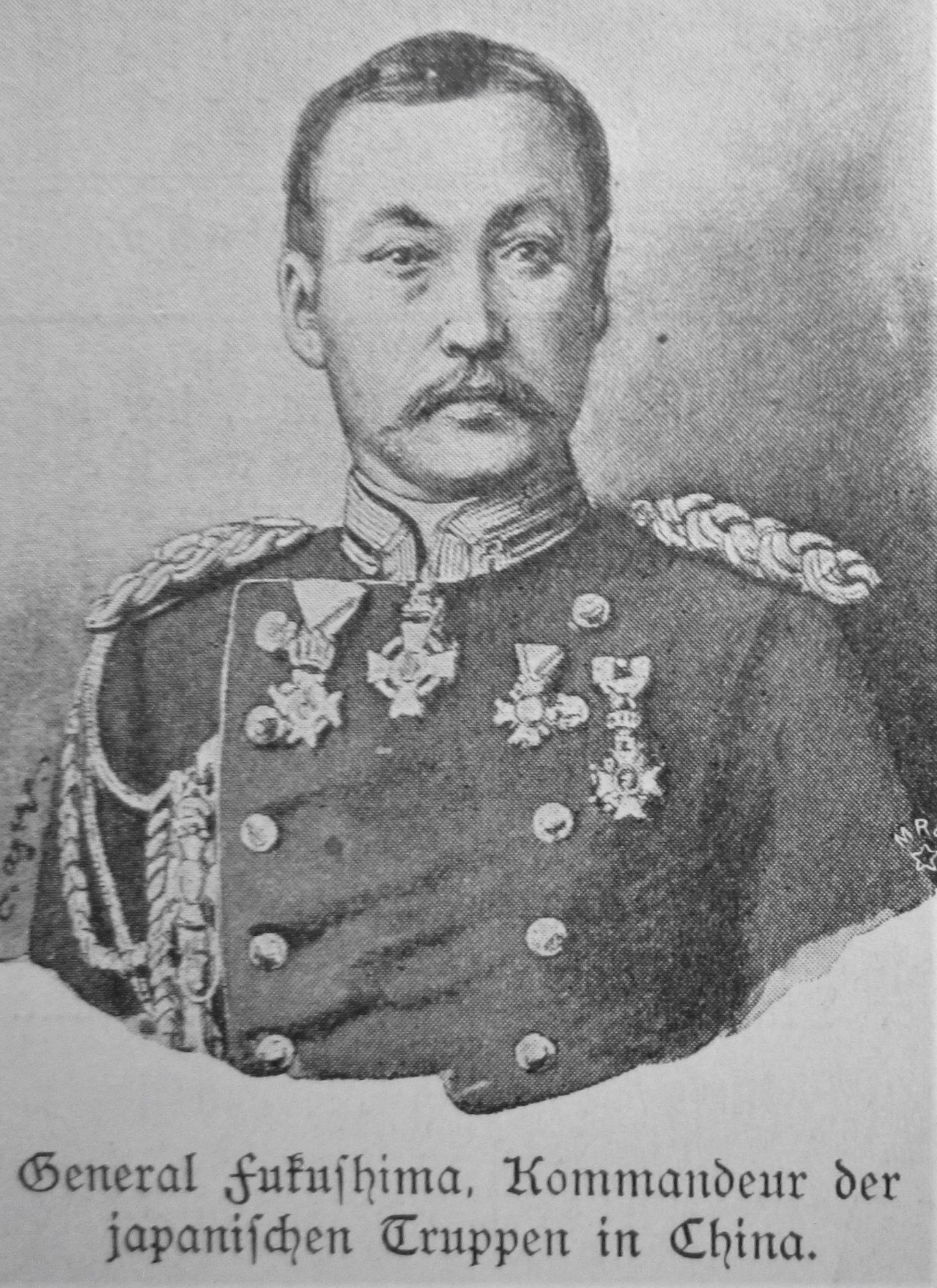
Major General Fukushima Yasumasa in 1900.

In May 1902, Major General Fukushima Yasumasa, who was a senior intelligence officer of the Army General Staff and the initial commander of the Japanese Army sent to China to stop the Boxer Rebellion in 1900, was sent to London to wrap up informal discussions on military intelligence cooperation. Director General of Mobilisation and Military Intelligence, Sir William Nicholson headed the British side of the negotiation, and various intelligence cooperation agreements were signed between the two in July. Fukushima represented Emperor Meiji at the coronation of King Edward VII on 9 August and stayed until September 1902 to work on the details. The existence and contents of the agreements were not made public.

== 1905 Revision ==
The alliance was renewed and expanded in 1905. This was partly prompted by Japan's gains in the Russo-Japanese War, and by the British suspicion about Russian intentions in South Asia, leading to Britain considering asking Japan to help defend India. This August 1905 revision additionally called for Japanese support of British interests in India (if Britain faced more than one adversary as stipulated in the original).

This revision was signed by Lords Lansdowne and Hayashi on 12 August 1905, effective 13 August for 10 years.

Within four months after the signing of this revision, Korea became a Japanese protectorate, and Itō Hirobumi was posted as the Resident-General to Seoul in February 1906.

== 1911 Revision ==
Although the "second" alliance in 1905 was effective for a decade, the alliance was revised earlier in 1911.

As a background, William McKinley won the 1896 United States presidential election, succeeding Grover Cleveland, who was a friend of Queen Liliʻuokalani of Hawaii. This Republican victory led to British-American rapprochement, and the annexation of the Republic of Hawaiʻi by the US, giving impetus to expansionists in the US. As a result of 1898 Spanish–American War, the Mariana Islands (including Guam) came under the United States control in December 1898. The Empire of Japan fought and lost against the US in 1899–1902, supporting the Philippines in Philippine–American War, which resulted in establishing control of the Philippine Islands by the US. The expansionistic policy of the Republican US administration was carried over to Theodore Roosevelt in 1901.
Great power politics substantially changed following the Anglo-Russian entente of 1907, which settled the Russo-British Great Game; continued Japanese negotiations in the wake of the Russo-Japanese War, including a 1907 partitioning of Manchuria with Russia; and the UK's growing rivalry with the German Empire.

With the increasing Japanese and the US influence not only in the Pacific but also in global politics in this context, Britain negotiated a "third" Anglo-Japanese alliance to carefully remove the United States from the possible 'adversary' in the agreement (ARTICLE 4), and Japan agreed in return for restoring Japan's tariff autonomy. Komura Jutarō and later Prime Minister Katō Takaaki were major negotiators during this 1911 revision.

This revision was signed by Secretary of State for Foreign Affairs Edward Grey and Japanese Ambassador to London, Count Katō Takaaki (Note: As Ambassador Extraordinary and Plenipotentiary of the emperor, he had the authority to make an agreement effective immediately on behalf of the Japanese government, without the additional step of ratification after signing.) on 13 July, effective 14 July 1911, with a 10 year term until July 1921.

== Effects ==
=== Forming alliance and rivalries ===
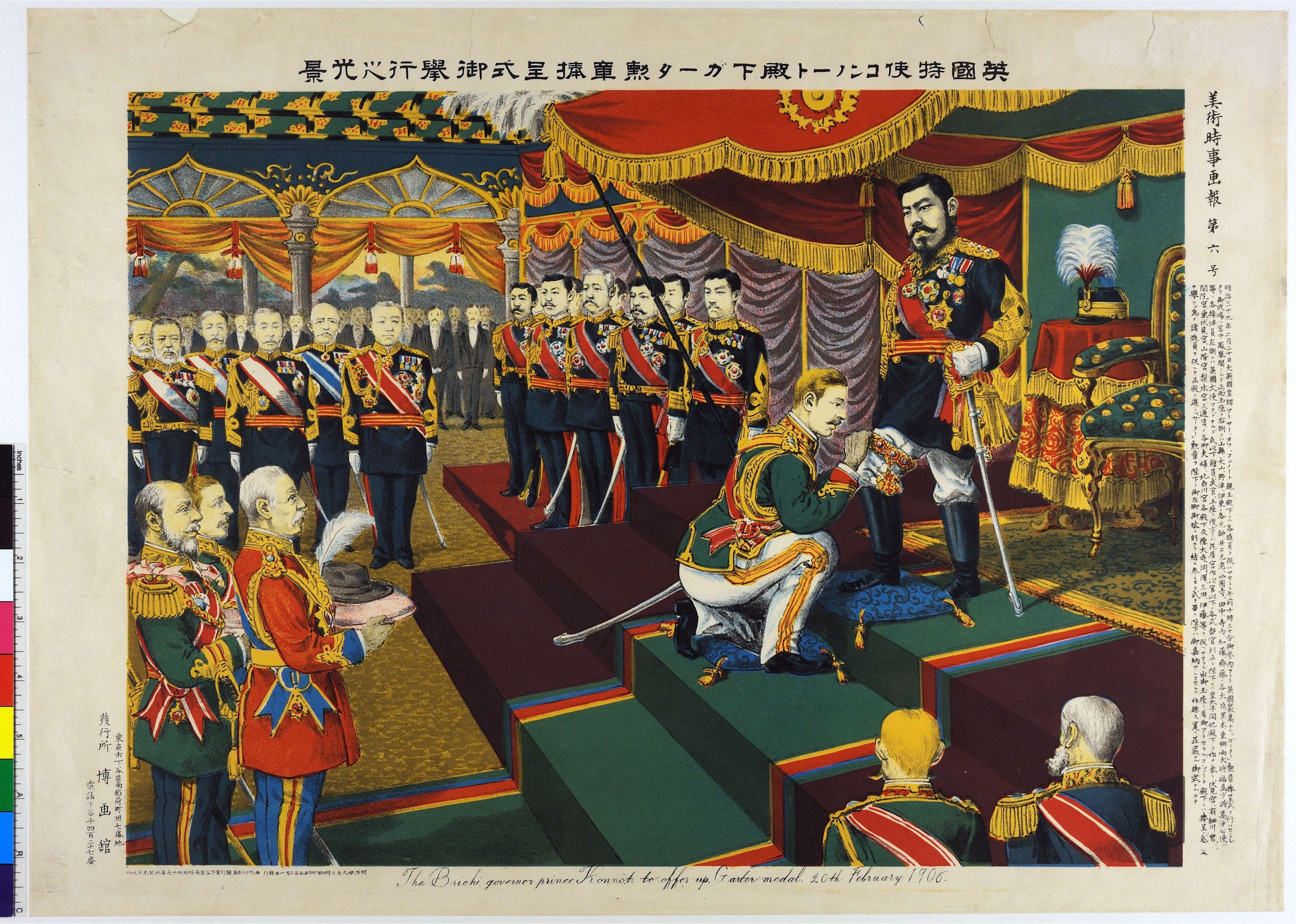
The Meiji Emperor receiving the Order of the Garter in 1906, as a consequence of the Anglo-Japanese Alliance.

The first version of the alliance was announced on 12 February 1902. In response, Russia sought to form alliances with France and Germany, which Germany declined. The French also were reluctant to become more deeply involved with Russia in east Asia. On 16 March 1902, a joint Franco-Russian declaration was issued responding to the alliance, reserving their right to intervene in and around China to defend their interests. The British and later historians found this declaration to be "anodyne", signaling that France was reconsidering its military obligations towards Russia. China and the United States were strongly opposed to the alliance.

=== Unofficial role in Russo-Japanese War ===
The Russo-Japanese War broke out in 1904, as Japan sought to halt the expansion of the Russian Empire's colonies in China. Britain did not officially join the Russo-Japanese War, but supported Japan in espionage, ship design, finance, and diplomacy during the war. (Note: The Anglo-Japanese Alliance was not activated, because its terms stipulated a promise of support only if a signatory entered war with more than one power, whereas Japan was only at war with Russia. However, the nature of the alliance meant that Russia's then closest ally, France, was unable to come to Russia's aid as this would have meant going to war with Britain. This was considered Britain's diplomatic contribution in favour of Japan, and as a result of these factors many Russians blamed the British for their defeat. Outright war between Russia and Britain came close during the Dogger bank incident. Japan, for its part, did not attempt to involve the British, instead going to great pains to show their victories were their own.)

Meanwhile, even before the war, British and Japanese intelligence had co-operated against Russia due to the Anglo-Japanese Alliance. During the war, Indian Army stations in Malaya and China often intercepted and read wireless and telegraph cable traffic relating to the war, which was shared with the Japanese. In their turn, the Japanese shared information about Russia with the British with one British official writing of the "perfect quality" of Japanese intelligence. In particular, British and Japanese intelligence gathered much evidence that Germany was supporting Russia in the war as part of a bid to disturb the balance of power in Europe, which led to British officials increasingly perceiving that country as a threat to the international order.

After the war ended, Britain did not mediate the Treaty of Portsmouth directly; the U.S., under President Theodore Roosevelt, fulfilled that role.

=== World War I ===
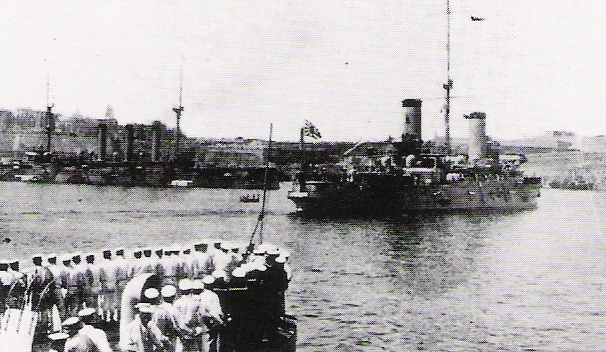
Japanese armoured cruiser Nisshin of the Imperial Japanese Navy, in the Mediterranean (Malta, 1919).

The alliance's provisions for mutual defence required Japan to enter the First World War on the British side. The Treaty made possible the Japanese seizure of German possessions in the Pacific north of the equator during the War. Japan attacked the German base at Qingdao in 1914 and forced the Germans to surrender (see Siege of Tsingtao). Japanese officers onboard British warships were casualties at the Battle of Jutland in 1916, and on HMS Vanguard in 1917. In 1917, Japanese warships were sent to the Mediterranean and assisted in the protection of Allied shipping near Malta from U-boat attacks. A memorial at the Kalkara Naval Cemetery in Malta is dedicated to the 72 Japanese sailors who died in the conflict, including the 1917 torpedoing of the Japanese destroyer Sakaki.

=== Cultural exchanges ===
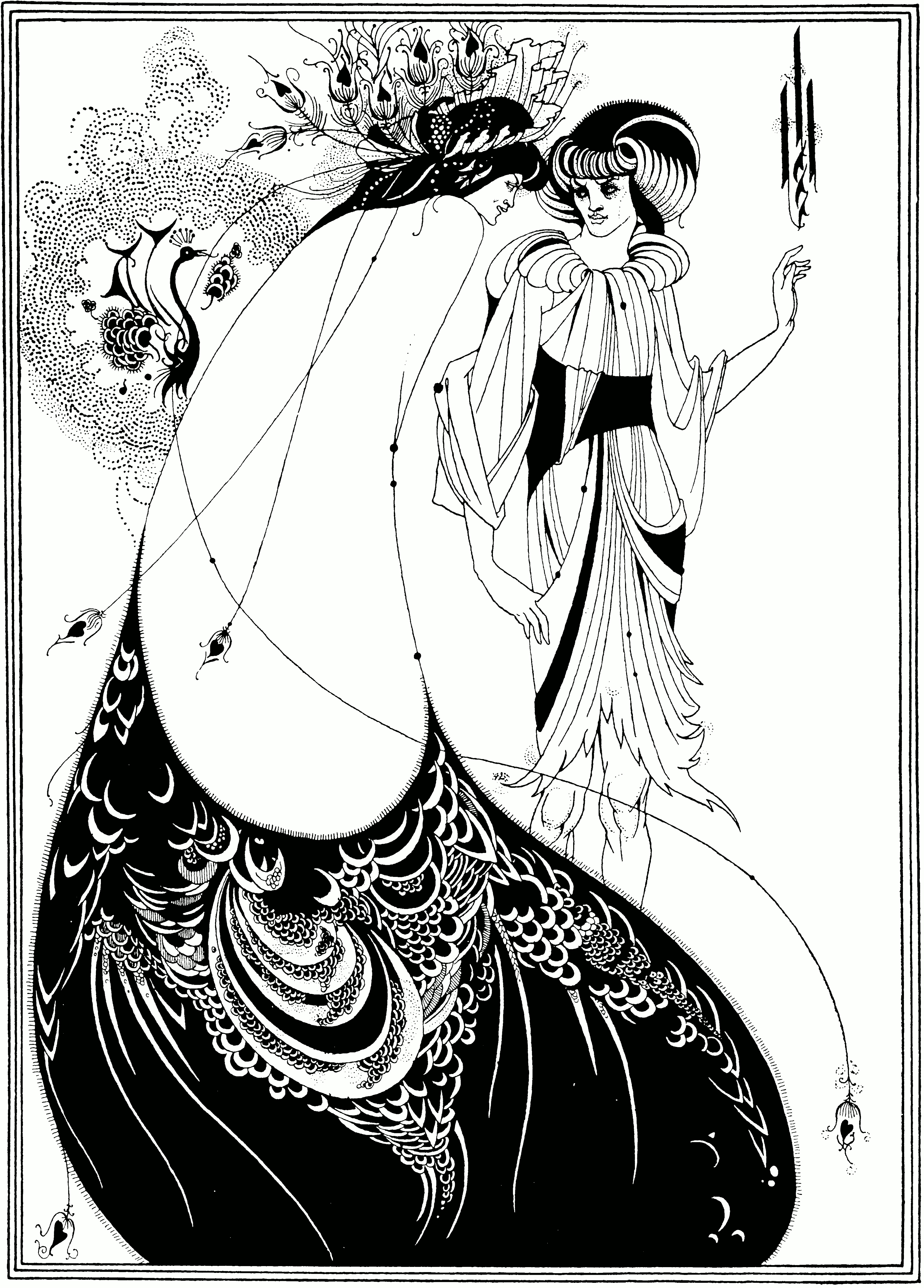
The Peacock Skirt, by Aubrey Beardsley, shows significant Japanese influence

The alliance formed the basis for positive trading and cultural exchanges between Britain and Japan. Japanese agencies published numerous English-language releases and publications. Rapid industrialisation and the development of the Japanese armed forces provided significant new export opportunities for British shipyards and arms manufacturers. Japanese educated in Britain brought new knowledge in science, engineering, and medicine to Japan, such as advances in fluid- and thermo-dynamics, (Note: e.g. the works of Osborne Reynolds, William Rankine, William Thomson, etc.) and ophthalmology. British artists of the time such as James McNeill Whistler, Aubrey Beardsley and Charles Rennie Mackintosh were heavily inspired by Japanese kimono, swords, crafts and architecture.

Unique cultural exchanges included that the author Yoshimoto Tadasu (b. 1878, d. 1973), who wrote True Britain (Shin no Eikoku) in 1902, was the first blind person in Japan to receive higher education, and brought some British ideas on public welfare to Japan. The clergyman Kumagai Tetsutaro (b. 1883, d. 1979) praised the book as having a major impact on opportunities for people with blindness.

The Japan–British Exhibition in 1910 in White City, London had eight million visitors. It sought to promote knowledge of Japan's modernization and the idea of an 'alliance of peoples' between Britain and Japan. It featured Japanese fine arts, musicians, Sumo demonstrations, and influenced by Edwardian expectations, it featured exhibitions of Ainu, Taiwanese and Japanese 'villages'. The organizers portrayed a cultural-historical parallel between Britain and Japan as symmetrical "Island Empires" in East and West. Organized by the Japanese government, it was one of the largest such expositions at its time.

== Limitations ==
Despite the purportedly friendly relations between Britain and Japan during the early 20th century, the relationship started to strain over various issues. One such strain was the issue of the "racial equality clause" as proposed by the Japanese delegation at the Paris Peace Conference. The clause, which was to be attached to the Covenant of the League of Nations, was compatible with the British stance of equality for all subjects as a principle for maintaining imperial unity; however, there were significant deviations in the stated interests of Britain's dominions, notably Australia, and the British delegation ultimately acceded to imperial opposition and declined to support the clause.

Another strain was the Twenty-One Demands issued by Japan to the Republic of China in 1915. The demands would have drastically increased Japanese influence in China and transformed the Chinese state into a de facto protectorate of Japan. Feeling desperate, the Chinese government appealed to Britain and the U.S., which forced Japan to moderate the demands issued; ultimately, the Japanese government gained little influence in China, but lost prestige amongst the Western nations (including Britain, which was affronted and no longer trusted the Japanese as a reliable ally).

Even though Britain was the wealthiest industrialized power, and Japan was a newly industrialized power with a large export market, which would seem to create natural economic ties, those ties were somewhat limited, which provided a major limitation of the alliance. British banks saw Japan as a risky investment due to what they saw as restrictive property laws and an unstable financial situation, and offered loans to Japan with high interest rates, similar to those they offered the Ottoman Empire, Chile, China, and Egypt, which was disappointing to Japan. The banker and later Prime Minister Takahashi Korekiyo argued that Britain was implying, through unattractive loan terms, that Japan had reverted from one of the "civilized nations" to "undeveloped nations", referring that Japan had more easily received foreign capital to fund its First Sino-Japanese War than the Russo-Japanese War. Nathaniel Rothschild was initially skeptical of Japan's economy; however, he would later describe Osaka as the "Manchester of Japan" and Japan as "one of the countries of the future." Henry Dyer wrote after 1906 that Japanese bonds "has aroused keen interest among British investors, who have always been partial to Japanese bonds." Dyer, a recipient of the Order of the Rising Sun from Emperor Meiji, had played a role in the expansion of industrialization and engineering in Japan as part of a significant foreign investment. Dyer criticized what he saw as widespread British skepticism of Japan's economy. Meanwhile, influential industrialists in Japan such as businessman Iwasaki Yanosuke were at times skeptical of foreign investment, which led the Japanese government to channel it through some controlled enterprises acting as intermediaries with the private sector in London and Tokyo, which was seen as excess regulation by some British industrialists. Nevertheless, Britain did lend capital to Japan during the Russo-Japanese War, while Japan provided major loans to the Entente during World War I.

== End of the treaty ==
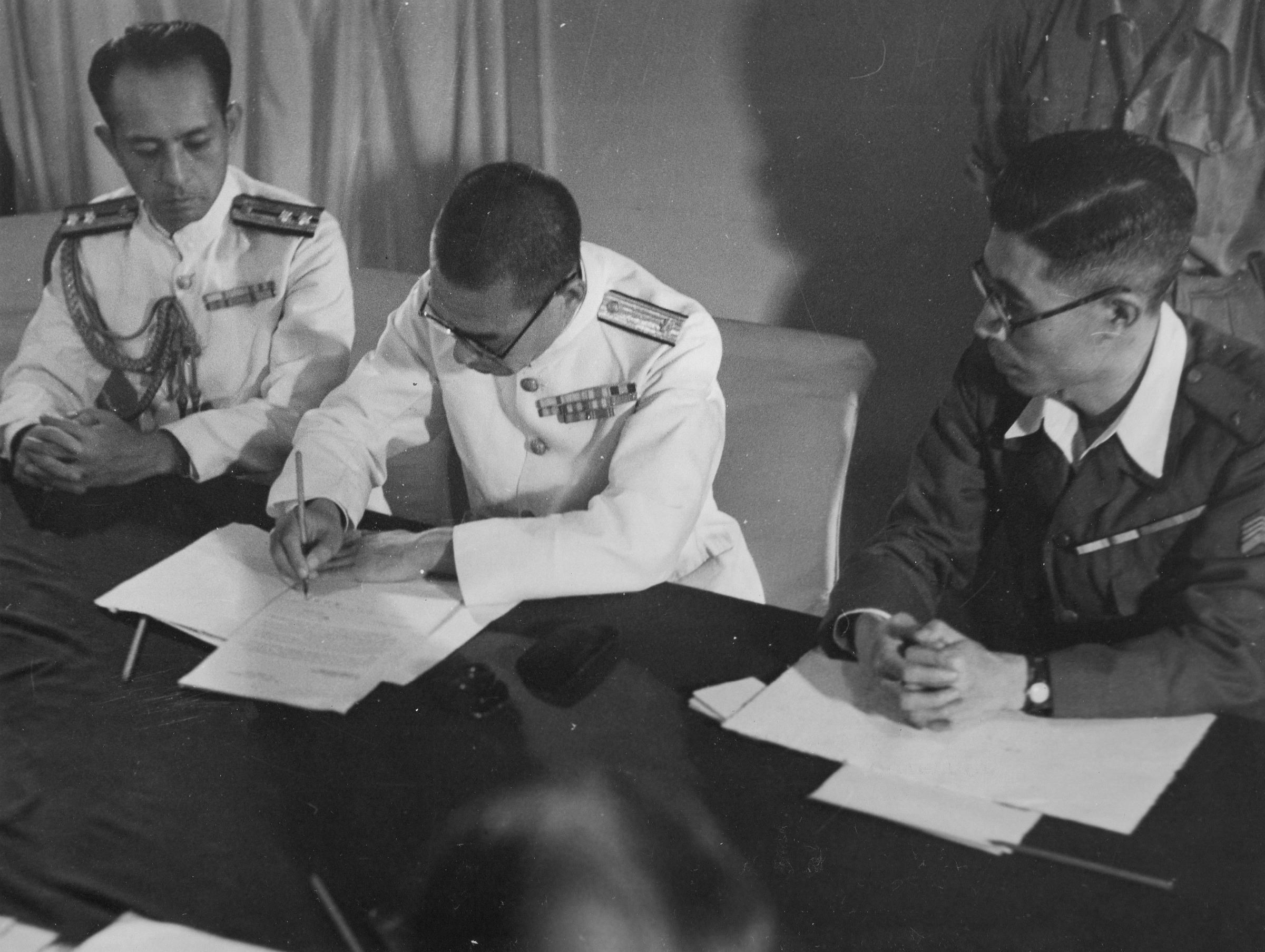
Rear Admiral Jisaku Uozumi signs the surrender of Penang aboard the battleship HMS Nelson on 2 September 1945. He fainted shortly afterward and was rushed to hospital. Note the Distinguished Service Cross ribbon on Uozumi's uniform, which he had earned from the British during the alliance. (Note: "After some delay, and a failure to attend an earlier meeting, the Japanese local commander, Rear Admiral Jisaku Uzumi, came aboard HMS Nelson on the evening of 2 September, wearing the DSC he had earned as Britain's ally in the 1914–18 war, and surrendered the garrison. He fainted and was rushed to hospital; the military policemen who carried him there took his sword as a souvenir." Bayly & Harper, page 49)

The alliance was viewed as an obstacle already at the Paris Peace Conference of 1919–1920. On 8 July 1920, the two governments issued a joint statement to the effect that the alliance treaty "is not entirely consistent with the letter of that Covenant (of the League of Nations), which both Governments earnestly desire to respect".

The demise of the alliance was signaled by the 1921 Imperial Conference, in which British and Dominion leaders convened to determine a unified international policy. One of the major issues of the conference was the renewal of the Anglo–Japanese Alliance. The conference began with all but Canadian Prime Minister Arthur Meighen supporting the immediate renewal of an alliance with Japan. The prevailing hope was for a continuance of the alliance with the Pacific power, which could potentially provide security for British imperial interests in the area. The Australians feared that they could not fend off any advances from the Imperial Japanese Navy, and desired a continuance of the buildup of naval resources for a possible future conflict as they feared that an alliance with the United States (then in a state of post-war isolationism) would provide little protection.

Meighen, fearing that a conflict could develop between Japan and the United States, demanded the British Empire remove itself from the treaty to avoid being forced into a war between the two nations. The rest of the delegates agreed that it was best to court America and try to find a solution that the American government would find suitable, but only Meighen called for the complete abrogation of the treaty. The American government feared that the renewal of the Anglo–Japanese Alliance would create a Japanese-dominated market in the Pacific, and close China off from American trade. These fears were elevated by the news media in America and Canada, which reported alleged secret anti-American clauses in the treaty, and advised the public to support abrogation.

The press, combined with Meighen's convincing argument of Canadian fears that Japan would attack imperial assets in China, caused the Imperial Conference to shelve the alliance. The conference communicated their desire to consider leaving the alliance to the League of Nations, which stated that the alliance would continue, as originally stated with the leaving party giving the other a twelve-month notice of their intentions.

Empire delegates convinced America to invite several nations to Washington to participate in talks regarding Pacific and Far East policies, specifically naval disarmament. When Japan came to the Washington Naval Conference, there was significant distrust of Britain in the press and public opinion, even amongst Japanese papers that had previously been more supportive of the Anglo-Japanese alliance.

Despite the growing rift, Japan joined the conference in hopes of avoiding a war with the United States. The Pacific powers of the United States, Japan, France and Britain would sign the Four-Power Treaty, and adding on various other countries such as China to create the Nine-Power Treaty. The Four-Power Treaty would provide a minimal structure for the expectations of international relations in the Pacific, as well as a loose alliance without any commitment to armed alliances. The Four-Power Treaty at the Washington Conference made the Anglo–Japanese Alliance defunct in December, 1921; however, it would not officially terminate until all parties ratified the treaty on 17 August 1923, as Britain did not notify Japan, nor did Japan notify the UK, of the termination after the July 1921 end of term, as required by ARTICLE 6 of the 1911 revision.

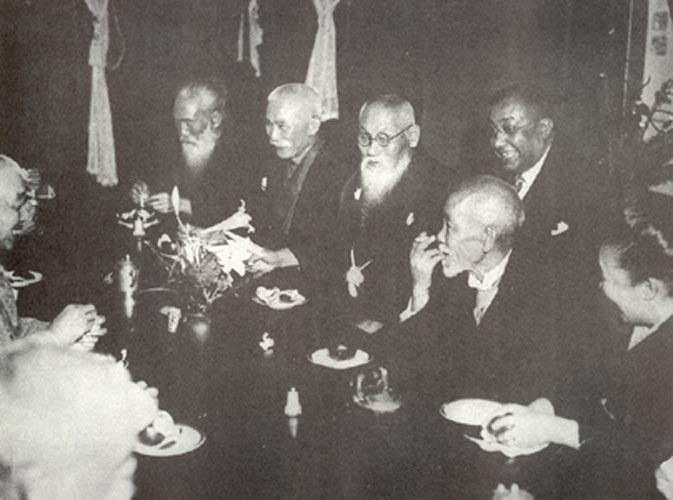
Toyama Mitsuru honours exiled Indian revolutionary Rash Behari Bose, 1915

At that time, the Alliance was officially terminated, as per Article IV in the Anglo–Japanese Alliance Treaties of 1902 and 1911. The distrust between the British Empire and Japan, as well as the manner in which the Anglo–Japanese Alliance concluded, have been suggested by some as being the leading causes of Japan's involvement in World War II, and that had the alliance not been terminated, Anglo-Japanese ties would not have deteriorated to that degree.

However, more recent scholarship has argued that such an interpretation amounts to historical myth-making, because it neglects how the political rivalry resulting from Japan and Britain's increasingly overlapping spheres of imperial influence had already substantially strained the alliance's political rationale for years before its termination. One key line of evidence is that Japan-British imperial interests had substantially conflicted before 1921 because Japan was already perceived to be undermining European colonial rule over Asia. Britain had specifically become increasingly suspicious of a potential Japanese threat to its Asian colonies and interests due to growing Japanese ambitions in China, the rise in Pan-Asianism, as demonstrated by the support shown by Japanese state and non-state actors for Indian revolutionaries, and the presence of Japanese propagandists in Malaya and India. Therefore, the end of the Alliance would instead be symptomatic of the already-present political reality of eroding ties between both countries, rather than its cause.

Such tensions were also evident in then-contemporary British political figures, such as Lord Curzon, who stated in 1920 that the main reason for the alliance with the "insidious and unscrupulous" Japanese was to keep them in order, rather than rooted in a friendly relations and diplomatic trust. These views were also reflected in British papers such as The Times, which even questioned Japanese contributions to the Allied side, and expressed suspicion towards Japan and sympathy with China in the aftermath of the 1919 Paris Peace Conference.

According to Zoltan Buzas, racially shaped threat perceptions led the British and the Americans to push for the termination of the alliance.

== See also ==
- List of military alliances
- Anglo-German naval arms race
- Anglo-Japanese Treaty of Commerce and Navigation
- Franco-Japanese Alliance attempted
- Eight-Nation Alliance
- History of Japanese foreign relations
- Japan–Korea Treaty of 1905
- Franco-Japanese Treaty of 1907
- Japan–United Kingdom relations
- Japanese entry into World War I
- Japan during World War I
- Root–Takahira Agreement
- Open Door Policy
