= Triple Intervention =

Aspect of Asian history

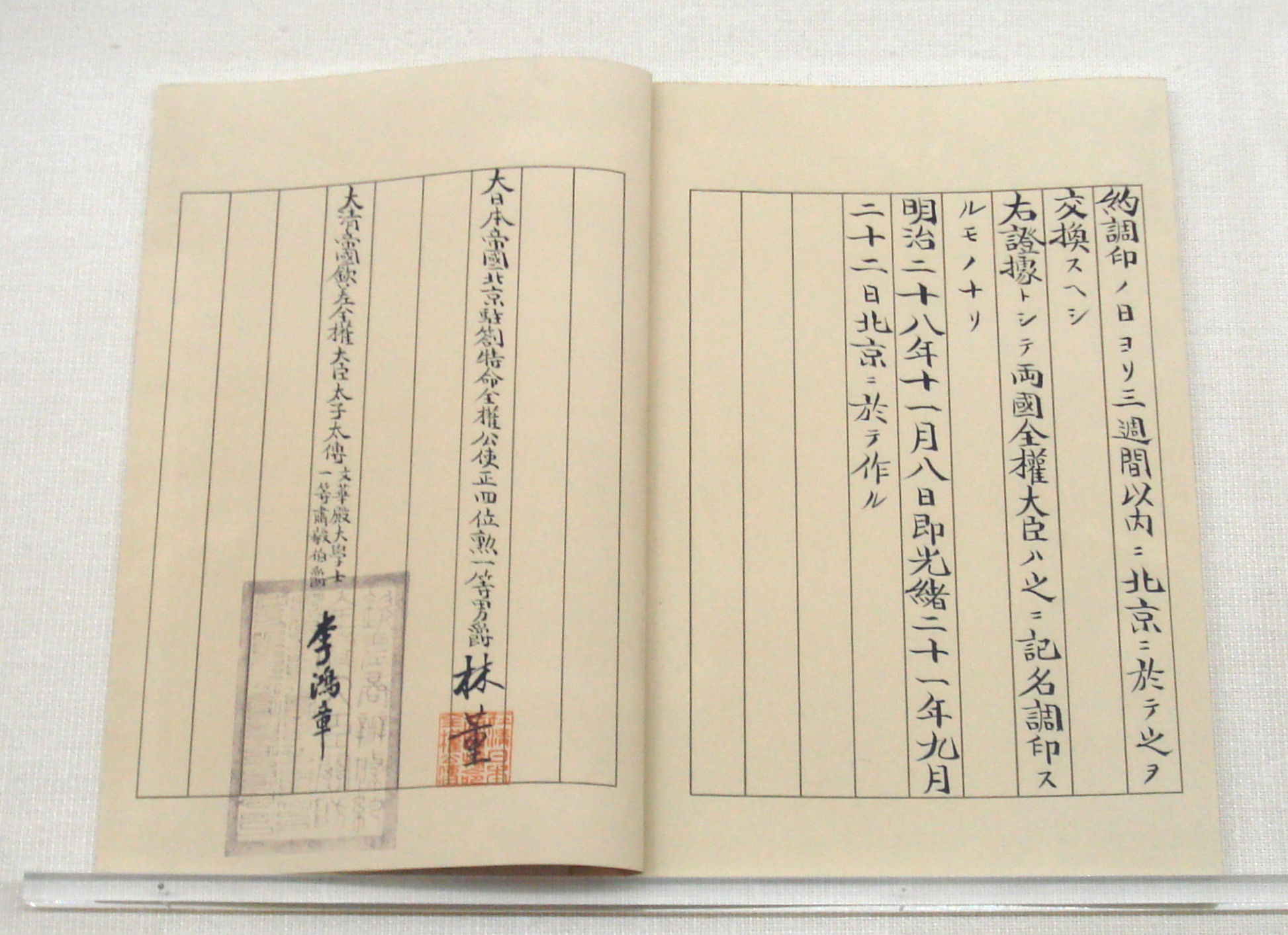
Convention of retrocession of the Liaodong Peninsula, 8 November 1895

The Triple Intervention (Japanese: 三国干渉, romanized: Sangoku Kanshō; German: Intervention von Shimonoseki; Russian: Тройное вмешательство, romanized: Troynoye vmeshatel'stvo), or the Tripartite Intervention, was a diplomatic intervention by Russia, Germany, and France on 23 April 1895 over the terms of the Treaty of Shimonoseki, imposed by Japan on Qing China at the end of the First Sino-Japanese War. The treaty, signed on 17 April, had ceded the island of Taiwan and the Liaodong Peninsula to Japan. In response, the three Western powers advised Japan to renounce the Liaodong Peninsula on the grounds that it would cause instability; Japan, anxious to keep their goodwill, did so by treaty on 8 November. The Japanese public was outraged, especially after Russia obtained a 25-year lease on the peninsula in 1898. The reaction against the Triple Intervention was one of the causes of the Russo-Japanese War of 1904–1905, in which Japan won the Russian lease on the peninsula.

== Treaty of Shimonoseki ==
Per the terms of the Treaty of Shimonoseki, Japan was awarded the Liaodong Peninsula including the harbor city of Port Arthur, which it had conquered from China. Immediately after the terms of the treaty became public, Russia—with its own designs and sphere of influence in China—expressed concern about the Japanese acquisition of the Liaodong Peninsula and the possible impact of the terms of the treaty on the stability of China. Russia persuaded France and Germany to apply diplomatic pressure on Japan for the return of the territory to China in exchange for a larger indemnity.

== The European powers ==
=== Russia ===
Russia had the most to gain from the Triple Intervention. In the preceding years, Russia had been slowly increasing its influence in the Far East since at least the Treaty of Aigun in 1858 and the building of her warm water port in Asian waters, Vladivostok. The construction of the Trans-Siberian Railway and the acquisition of another warm-water port on the China Seas would enable Russia to consolidate her presence in the region and further expand into Asia and the Pacific. Russia did not believe that the Japanese would be victorious against China in 1894. Port Arthur falling into Japanese hands would undermine its own desperate need for a warm-water port in the East.

=== France ===
France was obligated to join Russia due to their 1893 military alliance. French bankers did have financial interests in Russia, especially in railroads. However, France had no territorial ambitions in Manchuria, as its sphere of influence was in southern China (see Sino-French War). The French actually had cordial relations with the Japanese: French military advisors had been sent to train the Imperial Japanese Army since the expedition in 1867 and a number of Japanese ships were built in French shipyards. However, France did not wish to be diplomatically isolated, as she had been previously during Bismarck’s diplomatic quarantine of revanchist France after the Franco-Prussian War, especially given the growing power of Germany.

=== Germany ===
Germany had two reasons to support Russia. Firstly, it desired to draw Russia's attention to the east, away from itself. Secondly, to enlist Russia's support in establishing German territorial concessions in China. Germany hoped that supporting Russia would encourage Russia, in turn, to support Germany's colonial ambitions, which were especially vexed since Germany had only recently formed itself into a unified nation and had arrived late in the colonial "game". Germany herself had been recently converted to a colonies-seeking Power after the deposition of Bismarck as too conservative and traditionalist by the pro-Weltpolitik and blue-water navy policy Kaiser Wilhelm II, who was also by many accounts taken by a profound anti-Asian racial attitude, fearing the rise of Japanese domination years later after Russia’s defeat in 1905 in the Russo-Japanese War.

== Conclusion ==
The Japanese government reluctantly acceded to the intervention, as British and American diplomatic intercession was not forthcoming, and Japan was in no position to militarily resist three major European powers simultaneously. The three powers had 38 warships with a displacement of 95,000 tons already deployed in East Asia, whereas the Imperial Japanese Navy had only 31 warships in total with a displacement of 57,000 tons.

After futile diplomatic efforts to enlist the support of the United States and Great Britain, on 5 May 1895, Prime Minister Itō Hirobumi announced the withdrawal of Japanese forces from the Liaodong Peninsula in exchange for an additional indemnity of 30 million kuping taels (450 million yen). The last Japanese troops departed in December.

Much to Japan's astonishment and consternation, Russia moved almost immediately to occupy the entire Liaodong Peninsula and especially to fortify Port Arthur. Germany secured control over concessions in Shandong Province. France and even Great Britain took advantage of a weakened China to seize the port cities of Guangzhouwan and Weihaiwei, respectively, on various pretexts and to expand their spheres of influence.

Japan's government felt it had been cheated of its deserved spoils of war by this intervention. This humiliation at the hands of the European powers helped lead to the Gashin Shōtan (臥薪嘗胆) movement. Figuratively translated as "Persevering through Hardship (for the sake of revenge)", the saying is derived from the Chinese chengyu of wòxīnchángdǎn (臥薪嘗膽), literally meaning "sleeping on sticks and tasting gall", that alludes to the perseverance of King Goujian of Yue (reigned 496–465 BC) in the war between Wu and Yue. For modern Japan, this ideology meant an increase in heavy industry and the strength of the armed forces, especially the navy, at the expense of individual wants and needs.

The Triple Intervention had a profound effect on Japanese foreign relations, as Japanese diplomacy sought to avoid a reconstitution of a combination of European powers against Japan. It led directly to the Anglo-Japanese Alliance of 1902 which was explicitly intended to shield Japan from interference from other European great powers, and from Russia in particular.
