= Racial Equality Proposal =

Japanese proposed amendment to the Treaty of Versailles

The Racial Equality Proposal (Japanese: 人種的差別撤廃提案; lit. "Proposal to abolish racial discrimination") was an amendment to the Treaty of Versailles that was considered at the 1919 Paris Peace Conference.

Though it was broadly supported, the proposal did not become part of the treaty, largely because of opposition by the United States and the dominions of the British Empire delegation, namely Australia, Canada, and New Zealand.

The principle of racial equality was revisited after the war and incorporated into the United Nations Charter in 1945 as a fundamental principle of international justice. However, several countries, including members of the United Nations, would continue to retain racially discriminatory laws for decades after the end of the war.

== Background ==
Japan attended the 1919 Paris Peace Conference as one of five great powers, the only one which was non-Western. The presence of Japanese delegates in the Hall of Mirrors in Versailles signing the Treaty of Versailles on 28 June 1919 reflected the culmination of a half-century intensive effort by Japan to transform the nation into a modern state on the international stage.

=== Japanese domestic politics ===
Prime Minister Hara Takashi had come into power in September 1918 and was determined for Japan to adopt a pro-western foreign policy (欧米協調主義, ōbei kyōchō shugi) at the peace conference. That was largely in consequence of the World War I governments under Prime Ministers Ōkuma Shigenobu and Terauchi Masatake, whose expansionist policies had the effect of alienating Japan from both the United States and Britain. Takashi was determined to support the creation of the League of Nations at the peace conference to steer Japan back to the West. However, there was quite a bit of scepticism towards the League. Domestic opinion was divided into Japanese who supported the League and those who opposed it, the latter being more common in national opinion (国論, kokuron). Hence, the proposal had the role of appeasing the opponents by allowing Japan's acceptance of the League to be conditional on having a Racial Equality Clause inserted into the covenant of the League.

== Proposal ==
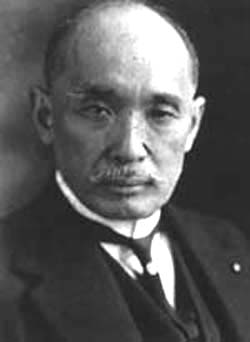
Baron Makino Nobuaki

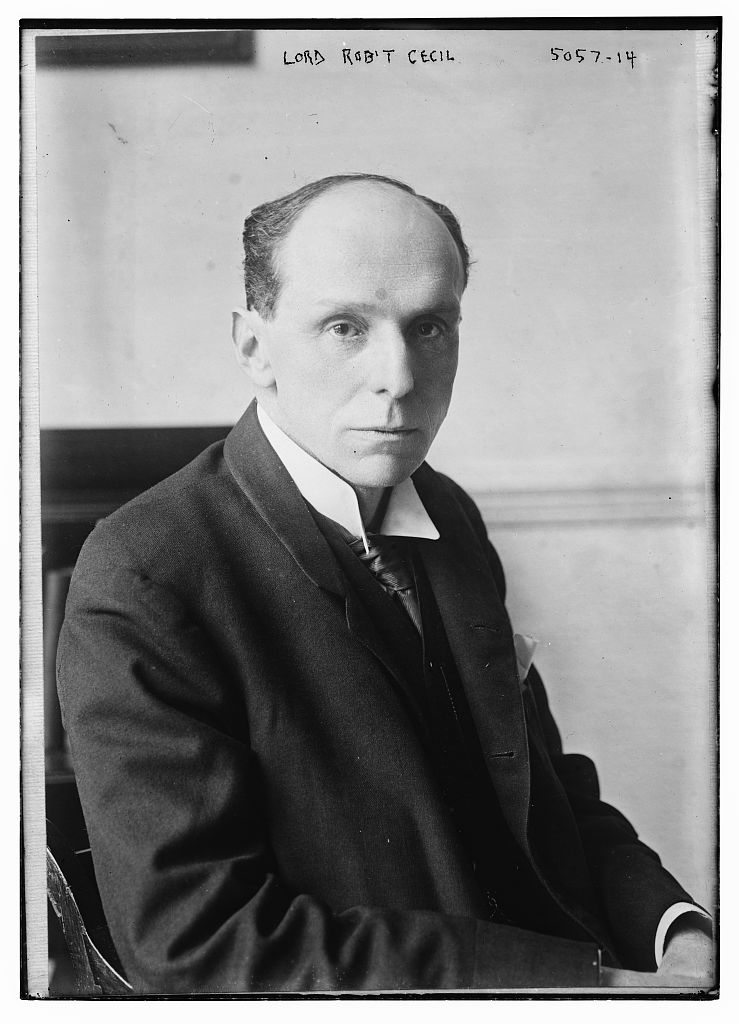
Lord Cecil

After the end of seclusion in the 1850s, Japan signed unequal treaties, the so-called Ansei Treaties, but soon came to demand equal status with the Western powers. Correcting that inequality became the most urgent international issue of the Meiji government. In that context, the Japanese delegation to the Paris peace conference proposed the clause in the Covenant of the League of Nations. The first draft was presented to the League of Nations Commission on 13 February as an amendment to Article 21:

The equality of nations being a basic principle of the League of Nations, the High Contracting Parties agree to accord as soon as possible to all alien nationals of states, members of the League, equal and just treatment in every respect making no distinction, either in law or in fact, on account of their race or nationality.

In a speech, the Japanese diplomat Makino Nobuaki stated that during the war men of different races had fought together on the Allied side, leading to say: "A common bond of sympathy and gratitude has been established to an extent never before experienced." The intention of the Japanese was to secure equality of their nationals and the equality for members of the League of Nations, but a universalist meaning and implication of the proposal became attached to it within the delegation, which drove its contentiousness at the conference.

After Makino's speech, Lord Cecil stated that the Japanese proposal was a very controversial one and he suggested that perhaps the matter was so controversial that it should not be discussed at all. Greek Prime Minister Eleftherios Venizelos also suggested that a clause banning religious discrimination should also be removed since that was also a very controversial matter.

Cecil removed all references to clauses that forbade racial and religious discrimination from the text of the peace treaty, but the Japanese made it clear that they would seek to have the clause restored. By then, the clause was beginning to draw widespread public attention. Demonstrations in Japan demanded the end of the "badge of shame" as policies to exclude Japanese immigration in the United States, Canada, Australia, and New Zealand received much attention in the Japanese media.

In the United States, the clause received much negative media coverage on the West Coast.

The Chinese delegation, which was otherwise in bitter enmity with the Japanese over the question of the former German colony of Qingdao and the rest of the German concessions in Shandong, also said that it would support the clause. However, one Chinese diplomat said at the time that the Shandong question was far more important to his government than the clause.

Australian Prime Minister Billy Hughes clarified his opposition and announced at a meeting that "ninety-five out of one hundred Australians rejected the very idea of equality." Hughes had entered politics as a trade unionist and, like most others in the working class, was very strongly opposed to Asian immigration to Australia. (The exclusion of Asian immigration was a popular cause with unions in Canada, the US, Australia, and New Zealand in the early 20th century.) Hughes believed that accepting the clause would mean the end of the White Australia immigration policy that had been adopted in 1901 and wrote: "No Gov't could live for a day in Australia if it tampered with a White Australia." Hughes stated, "The position is this-either the Japanese proposal means something or it means nothing: if the former, out with it; if the latter, why have it?" New Zealand Prime Minister William Massey also came out in opposition to the clause though not as vociferously as Hughes.

Makino Nobuaki, the career diplomat who headed the Japanese delegation, then announced at a press conference: "We are not too proud to fight but we are too proud to accept a place of admitted inferiority in dealing with one or more of the associated nations. We want nothing but simple justice." France declared its support for the proposal since the French position had always been that the French language and culture was a "civilizing" force open to all regardless of skin color. British Prime Minister David Lloyd George found himself in an awkward situation since Britain had signed an alliance with Japan in 1902, but he also wanted to hold the British Empire's delegation together. South African Prime Minister General Jan Smuts and Canadian Prime Minister Sir Robert Borden tried to work out a compromise by visiting Makino and Chinda Sutemi and Hughes, serving as mediators. Borden and Smuts were able to arrange a meeting between Makino, Chinda, and Hughes, which ended badly. The Japanese diplomats wrote that Hughes was a vulgar "peasant" who was loud and obnoxious, and Hughes complained that the Japanese had been "beslobbering me with genuflexions and obsequious deference." However, Borden and Smuts were able to persuade Hughes to accept the clause if it was declared that it did not affect immigration. Makino and Chinda then rejected the compromise.

== Vote ==
On 11 April 1919, the commission held a final session. Makino stated the Japanese plea for human rights and racial equality. The British representative Robert Cecil spoke for the British Empire and addressed opposition to the proposal. Italian Prime Minister Vittorio Orlando spoke in favor of the statement on human rights. French Senator Léon Bourgeois urged its adoption and stated that it would be impossible to reject the proposal, which embodied "an indisputable principle of justice."

The proposal received a majority vote on the day, with 11 of the 17 delegates present voted in favor of its amendment to the charter, and no negative vote was taken:

- Japan (2) Yes
- France (2) Yes
- Italy (2) Yes
- Brazil (1) Yes
- China (1) Yes
- Greece (1) Yes
- Serbia (1) Yes
- Czechoslovakia (1) Yes

Total: 11 Yes

- British Empire (2) – Not Registered
- United States (2) – Not Registered
- Portugal (1) – Not Registered
- Romania (1) – Not Registered
- Belgium (2) – Absent

The chairman, Woodrow Wilson, overturned it by saying that although the proposal had been approved by a clear majority, the particular matter had strong opposition manifest itself (despite the lack of any actual votes against the proposal) and that on this issue, a unanimous vote would be required. French delegate Ferdinand Larnaude immediately stated that "a majority had voted for the amendment." Meanwhile, the Japanese delegation wanted the transcript to show that a clear majority had been voted for the amendment.

Though the proposal itself was compatible with the British stance of equality for all subjects as a principle for maintaining imperial unity, there were significant deviations in the stated interests of its dominions, notably Australia. As it risked undermining the White Australia policy, Billy Hughes and Joseph Cook vigorously opposed the proposal behind the scenes and advocated against it through the British delegation. Without the support of its dominions, the British delegation could not take such a stand on principle. According to the diary of Cecil, the delegate representing the British Empire at the conference:

...it is curious how all the foreigners perpetually harp on principle and right and other abstractions, whereas the Americans and still more the British are only considering what will give the best chance to the League of working properly.

To placate Japan, Wilson promised to support the Japanese claims on the former German possessions in China and said that it would be Japan's reward for accepting the rejection of the proposal. Furthermore, over the advice of the US Navy, Wilson also agreed to support Japanese claims to the Marianas, Marshall, and Caroline islands in the Pacific Ocean, which Japan had occupied in 1914, as mandates that Japan would administer on behalf of the League of Nations, instead of allowing the Japanese to annex the islands outright, as they had wanted. In May 1919, the peace conference formally decided that Japan would receive the Carolines, Marshall, and Marianas Islands as Class C League of Nations mandates. In the 1920s, Japan violated the terms of the mandates by preventing representatives of the League from visiting the islands, by bringing in settlers on the islands, and by building military bases, most notably at Truk, which became the main Japanese naval base in the Pacific. The Canadian historian Margaret MacMillan noted that some of the islands (most notably Truk, Tinian, and Saipan) that had been awarded to Japan in 1919 to be developed peacefully would become the scenes for famous battles in World War II.

== Aftermath ==
Cecil felt that British support for the League of Nations was far more important than the clause. The Japanese media fully covered the progress of the conference, which led to the alienation of public opinion towards the US and would foreshadow later, broader conflicts.

In the United States, racial riots resulted from deliberate inaction.

The international mood had changed so dramatically by 1945, that the contentious point of racial equality would be incorporated into that year's United Nations Charter as a fundamental principle of international justice.

Some historians consider that the rejection of the clause could be listed among the many causes of conflict that led to World War II. They maintain that the rejection of the clause proved to be an important factor in turning Japan away from co-operation with the West and toward militarism. In 1923, the Anglo-Japanese Alliance expired. Militarists came to power resulting in Japan's rapprochement with Hitler. Prussian militarism had already become entrenched in the Imperial Japanese Army, many of whose members had expected Germany to win World War I. However, relations with Germany became even stronger in the mid-1930s while Germany had greater ties with Nationalist China.

After the Nazis gained power in Germany, Japan decided to not expel Jewish refugees from China, Manchuria, and Japan and advocated the political slogan hakkō ichiu (literally "eight crown cords, one roof", or "all the world under one roof").

== See also ==
- Woodrow Wilson and race
- The Race Question, UNESCO 1950
- Yellow Peril

== References and further reading ==
- Dickinson, Frederick R. "More than a ‘moment’: Woodrow Wilson and the foundations of twentieth century Japan." Japanese Journal of Political Science 19.4 (2018): 587-599.
- Dikötter, Frank (2006). The construction of racial identities in China and Japan:historical and contemporary perspectives. Stanford University Press. ISBN 0-8047-5408-X.
- Kiyoshi Kari Kawakami (1919). "The Race Problem and the World League". Japan and World Peace. New York: MacMillan. pp. 45–62 online, A Japanese perspective.
- Lauren, Paul Gordon (1988). Power And Prejudice: The Politics And Diplomacy Of Racial Discrimination. Westview Press. ISBN 0-8133-0678-7.
- MacMillan, Margaret (2003). Paris 1919: Six Months That Changed the World. Random House. ISBN 0-375-76052-0.
- Nimmo, William F. (2001). Stars and Stripes Across the Pacific: The United States, Japan, and Asia/Pacific Region, 1895–1945. Greenwood Publishing Group. ISBN 0-275-96453-1.
- Osborne, Sidney. " The Questions of Race Equality and Shantung" in Osborne, The New Japanese Peril (1921) pp 62-71. online
- Russell, John G. (2009). "Chapter 5: The other other". Japan's Minorities: The Illusion of Homogeneity. Taylor & Francis. ISBN 978-0-415-77263-1.
- Shimazu, Naoko (1998). Japan, Race and Equality. Routledge. ISBN 0-415-17207-1.
- Shin, Gi-Wook (1997). Ethnic nationalism in Korea: genealogy, politics, and legacy. C. Hurst & Co. Publishers. ISBN 1-85065-353-4.
- Steeds, David. "Anglo-Japanese Relations, 1902–23: a Marriage of Convenience." The History of Anglo-Japanese Relations (Palgrave Macmillan, London, 2000) pp. 197-223.
- Temperley, H.W.V. (1924). A History of the Peace Conference of Paris. Vol. 6. London: Henry Frowde and Hodder Stoughton.
