= German colonial empire =

German colonies from 1884 to 1920

German Colonial empire Deutsches Kolonialreich (German)
- 1884–1920
- Flag Coat of arms
- Motto: Gott mit uns "God with us"
- Anthem: "Heil dir im Siegerkranz" (German) (English: "'Hail to Thee in the Victor's Crown")
- Areas of the world that were subject to German colonization at some point in history
- Status: Colonial Empire
- Capital: Berlin
- Common languages: German; Local: Swahili, Rwanda-Rundi (Burundi, Rwanda, Buha kingdom in Tanzania), Papuan, Samoan (in New Guinea and Samoa)
- Emperor
  - 1871 - 1888: Wilhelm I
  - 1888: Frederick III
  - 1888 - 1918: Wilhelm II
- State Secretary for the Colonies
  - 1890: Friedrich Richard Krauel (first)
  - 1919: Johannes Bell (last)
- Chancellor of the German Empire
  - 1871 - 1890: Otto von Bismarck (first)
  - 1918 - 1920: Friedrich Ebert (last)
- History
  - Established: 1884
  - Abushiri revolt: 1888
  - Heligoland–Zanzibar Treaty: 1890
  - Adamawa Wars: 1899
  - Herero Wars: 1904
  - Maji Maji Rebellion: 1905
  - Treaty of Versailles: 1919
  - Disestablished: 1920

Area
- 1912: 3,494,019 km^{2} (1,349,048 sq mi)

Population
  - 1912: 11,979,000

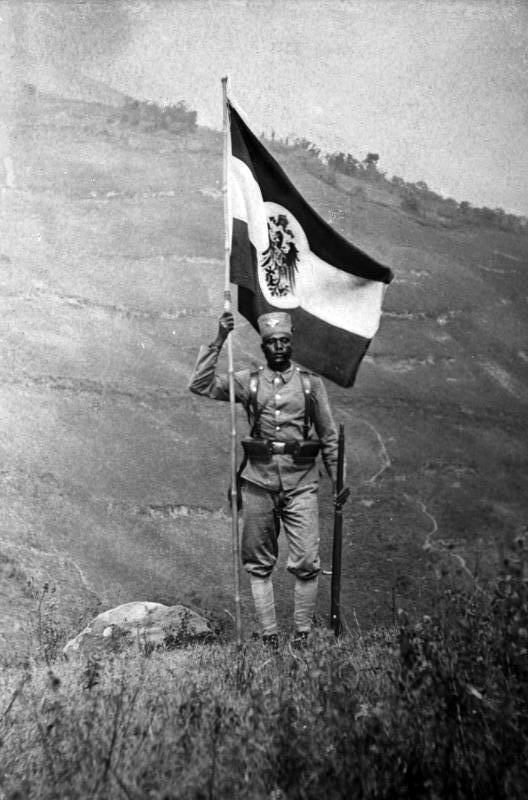
An East African Askari soldier holding Germany's colonial flag

The German colonial empire (German: deutsches Kolonialreich) constituted the overseas colonies, dependencies, and territories of the German Empire. Unified in 1871, the chancellor of this time period was Otto von Bismarck. Short-lived attempts at colonization by individual German states had occurred in preceding centuries, but Bismarck resisted pressure to construct a colonial empire until the Scramble for Africa in 1884. Claiming much of the remaining uncolonized areas of Africa, Germany built the third-largest colonial empire at the time, after the British and French. The German colonial empire encompassed parts of Africa and Oceania.

Germany lost control of most of its colonial empire at the beginning of the First World War in 1914, but some German forces held out in German East Africa until the end of the war. After the German defeat in World War I, Germany's Colonial Empire was officially confiscated as part of the Treaty of Versailles between the Allies and German Weimar Republic. Each colony became a League of Nations mandate under the administration, although not sovereignty, of one of the Allied powers. Talk of regaining the colonies persisted in Germany until 1943, but never became an official goal of the German government.

== Origins ==
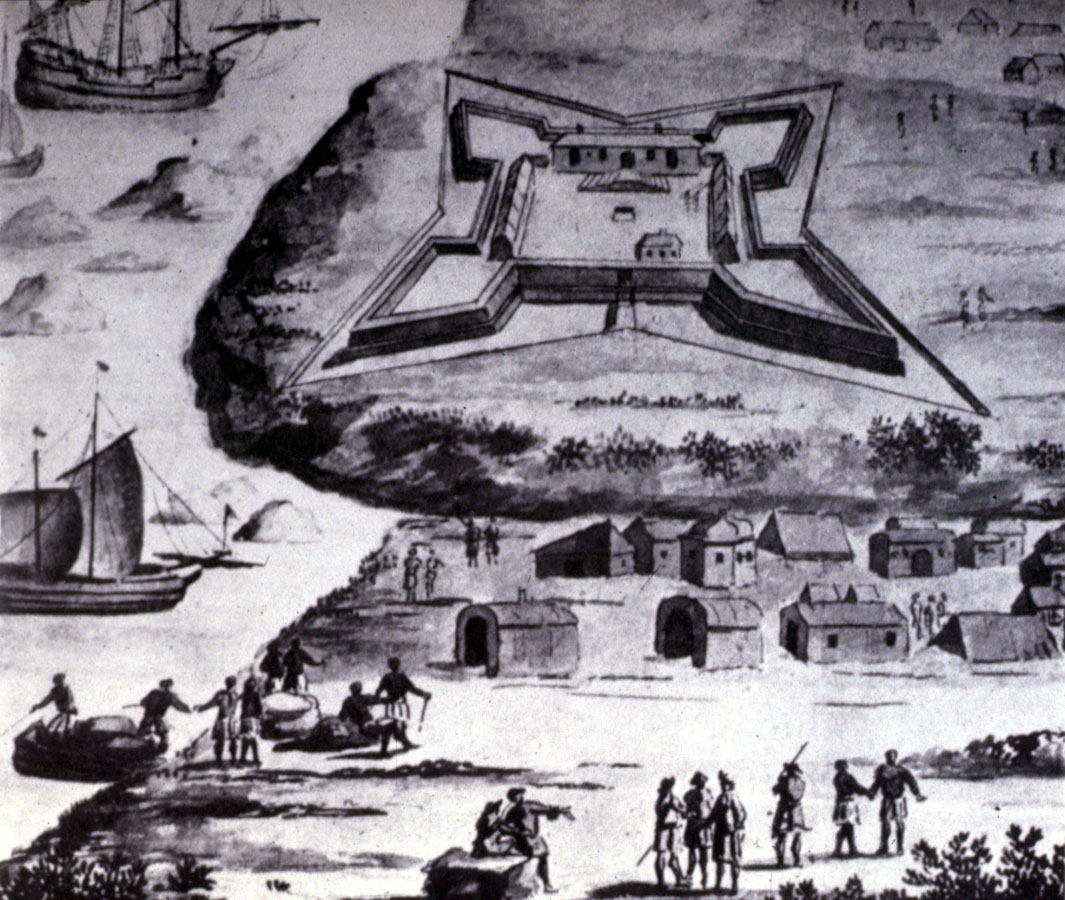
Groß-Friedrichsburg, a Brandenburg colony (1683–1717) in the territory of modern Ghana

Germans had traditions of foreign sea-borne trade dating back to the Hanseatic League; German emigrants had flowed eastward in the direction of the Baltic littoral, Russia and Transylvania and westward to the Americas; and North German merchants and missionaries showed interest in overseas engagements. The Hanseatic republics of Hamburg and Bremen sent traders across the globe. Their trading houses conducted themselves as successful Privatkolonisatoren [independent colonizers], concluding treaties and land purchases in Africa and the Pacific with chiefs and/or other tribal leaders. These early agreements with local entities later formed the basis for annexation treaties, diplomatic support, and military protection by the German government.

However, until their 1871 unification, the German states had not concentrated on the development of a navy, and this essentially had precluded German participation in earlier imperialist scrambles for remote colonial territory. Without a blue-water navy, a would-be colonial power could not reliably defend, supply, or trade with overseas dependencies. The German states before 1870 had retained separate political structures and goals, and German foreign policy up to and including the age of Otto von Bismarck (1815–1898; in office as Prussian Foreign Minister from 1862 to 1890) concentrated on resolving the "German question" in Europe and on securing German interests on the continent. However, by 1891 the Germans were mostly united under Prussian rule. They also sought a more clear-cut "German" state, and saw colonies as a good way to achieve that.

=== German Confederation and the Zollverein ===
In the states of the German Confederation founded in 1815 and the Zollverein established in 1834, there was some call from private and economic interests for the establishment of German colonies, especially in the 1840s. However, governments had no such aspirations. In 1839, private interests founded the Hamburg Colonial Society, which sought to purchase the Chatham Islands east of New Zealand and settle German emigrants there, but Great Britain had a preexisting claim to the island. Hamburg relied on the Royal Navy for its worldwide shipping interests and therefore gave no political support to the Colonial Society. The Society for the Protection of German Immigrants to Texas, established in Mainz in 1842, sought to expand the German settlements into a colony of "New Germany" (German: Neu Deutschland). About 7,400 settlers were involved. The venture proved a complete failure. There was a constant lack of supplies and land and around half of the colonists died. The plan was definitively ended with the annexation of Texas by the United States in 1845.

Starting in the 1850s German commercial enterprises spread into areas that would later become German colonies in West Africa, East Africa, the Samoan Islands, the unexplored north-east quarter of New Guinea with its adjacent islands, the Douala delta in Cameroon, and the mainland coast across from Zanzibar.

=== First state-sponsored colonial venture (1857–1862) ===
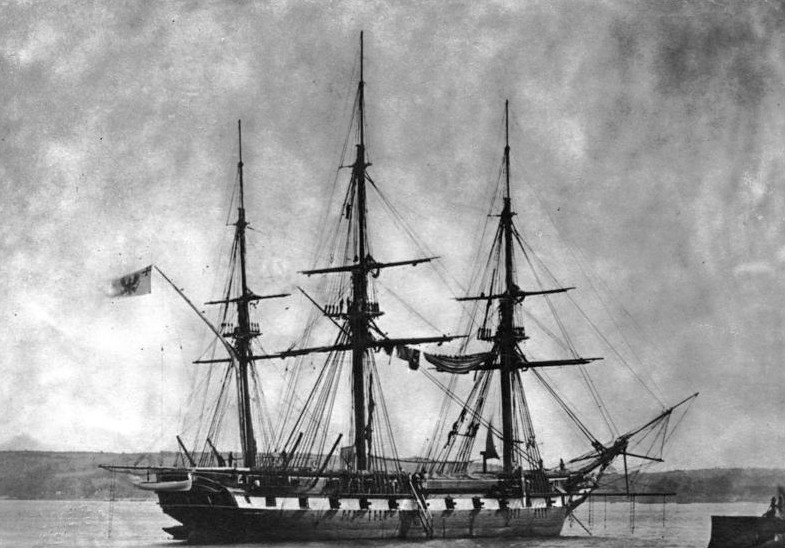
The Thetis, one of the ships of the East Asia Squadron

In 1857, the Austrian frigate Novara departed from Triest on the Novara Expedition, which aimed to explore and take possession of the Nicobar Islands in the Indian Ocean. The Novara arrived at the Nicobars in 1858, but the Austrians did not subsequently claim the islands.

The next state-sponsored attempt to acquire a colony occurred in 1859, when Prussia attempted to claim the island of Formosa (modern Taiwan). Prussia had already sought the approval of the French Emperor Napoleon III for the undertaking since France was also seeking to acquire colonies in East Asia at that time. Since French interests focused on Vietnam, not Formosa, Prussia could seek to acquire the island. A Prussian naval expedition, which departed Germany at the end of 1859, was tasked with concluding trade treaties in Asia for Prussia and the other states of the Zollverein and with occupying Formosa. However, this task was not carried out, due to the limited strength of the expedition forces and because they did not wish to preclude a trade treaty with Qing China. In a cabinet order of 6 January 1862, the expedition's ambassador, Friedrich Albrecht zu Eulenburg was "released from carrying out the part of his task concerned with the identification of overseas settlements suitable for Prussian settlement."

Despite this, one ship from the expedition, the Thetis was sent to Patagonia in South America to investigate its prospects as a colony, since the Prussian naval command in particular were interested in the establishment of a naval strong point on the South American coast. The Thetis had already reached Buenos Aires and the commander of the ship decided to return to Germany due to the exhaustion of the men after the year-long expedition and the need for repairs to the ship.

=== Bismarck's rejection of colonization (1862–1871) ===
Otto von Bismarck, foreign minister and minister president of the Kingdom of Prussia and later chancellor of Germany, was opposed to any state-sponsored efforts to establish overseas colonies, a sentiment summarized in the influential biography Bismarck: The Man and the Statesman as "he said repeatedly: 'I am no man for colonies'".

While notably not rooted in humanitarian, legal or moral concerns like later anti-colonialism, Bismarck's scepticism was based on the perceived non-profitability, infeasibility, lack of strategic relevance and incompatibility with his balance-of-power-based foreign policy approach (see Kissingen Dictation).

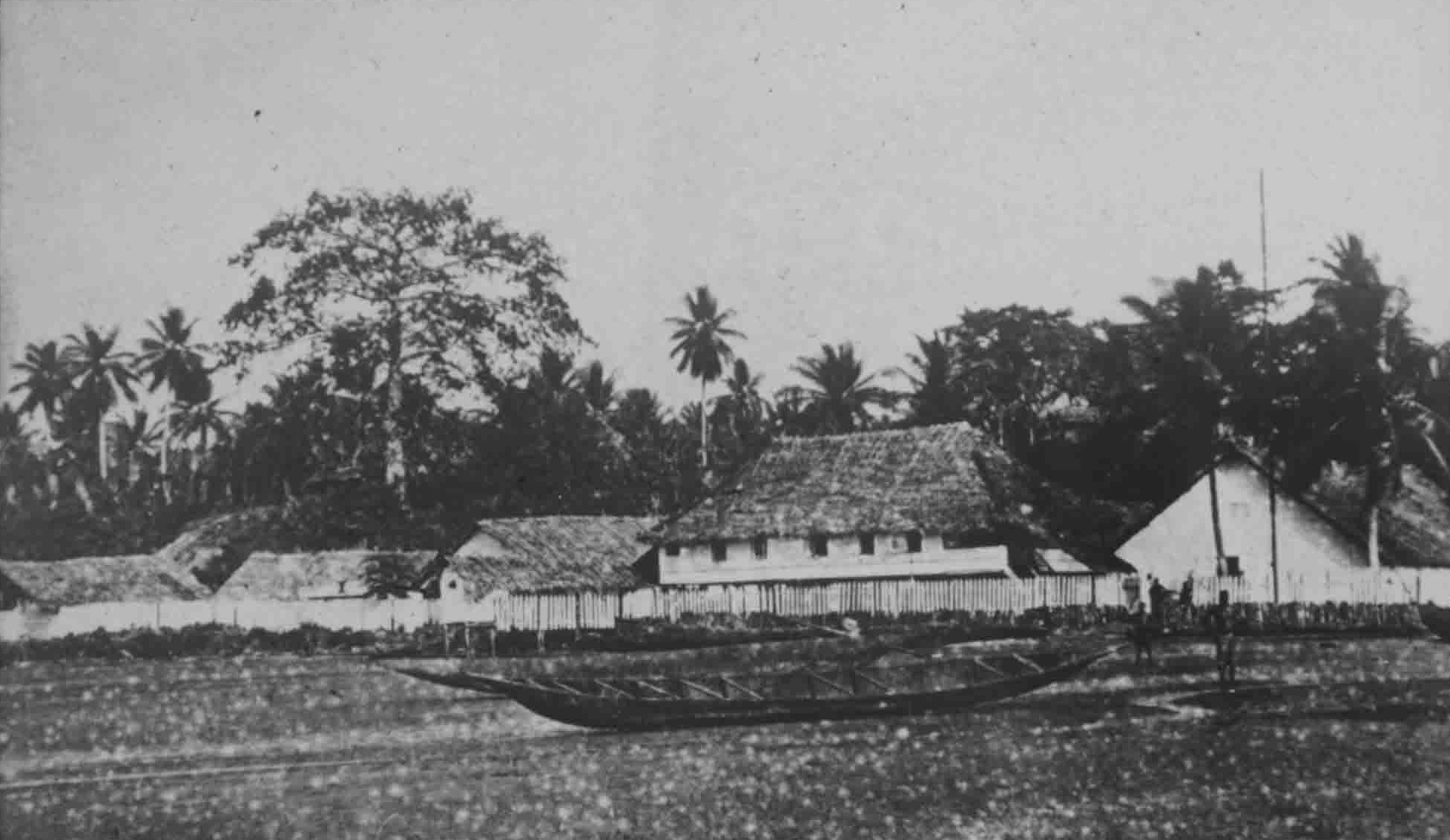
Woermann-Linie factory in Cameroon. From the 1830s, German shipping participated in trade with Africa and established factories there. From the 1850s, trade and plantation agriculture were undertaken by German companies in the South Seas. Some of these economic enterprises eventually formed the basis for the regions' conversion into German colonies.

After the Second Schleswig War in 1864, colonialist societies in Prussia aspired to take possession of the Nicobar Islands which had previously been in Danish possession. For its part, Denmark unsuccessfully proposed to exchange the Danish West Indies for some of the lost territory in Schleswig in 1865. In 1866 and then again in 1876, Jamal ul-Azam, Sultan of the Sulu Islands, located between Borneo and the Philippines, offered to place his islands under Prussian and then Imperial German control, but both times he was rebuffed. Ahmad ibn Fumo Bakari, the Sultan of Wituland asked the Prussian traveler Richard Brenner to establish a Prussian protectorate over his lands, but this request was never considered in Berlin.

In the 1867 constitution of the North German Confederation, article 4.1 declared "colonization" as one of the areas under the "oversight of the Confederation", which remained the case in the Imperial constitution established in 1871.

In 1867/1868, Otto von Bismarck dispatched the screw corvette Augusta to the Caribbean to show the flag of the North German Confederation. At the personal urging of Prince Adalbert, the commander of the North German Federal Navy, and without Bismarck's knowledge, the commander of the Augusta, Franz Kinderling conducted negotiations with José María Castro Madriz, President of Costa Rica with a view to establishing a naval base at Puerto Limón. Bismarck rejected the acquisition, due to the American Monroe Doctrine. This desire to avoid antagonising the United States also led him to reject a Dutch offer to establish a naval base on the Dutch island of Curaçao.

In 1868, Bismarck made his opposition to any colonial acquisitions clear in a letter to the Prussian Minister of War Albrecht von Roon:

On the one hand, the benefits which one might derive from colonies for the Motherland's trade and industry are mostly illusory. Then, the costs which the foundation, maintenance, and especially the establishment of claims to colonies entail very often exceed the utility which the Motherland gets from them, entirely apart from the fact that it is difficult to justify placing significant tax burdens on the whole nation for the benefit of individual commercial and industrial interests. On the other hand, our navy is not sufficiently developed to be able to undertake the task of firmly protecting distant states.

The policy of the North German Confederation at this time focussed on the acquisition of individual naval bases, not colonies. With these it would be able to use gunboat diplomacy to protect the global trade interests of the Confederation through a kind of informal imperialism. In 1867, it was decided to establish five overseas bases. Accordingly, in 1868, land was bought in Yokohama in Japan for a German naval hospital, which remained in operation until 1911. In 1869 the "East Asian Station" (Ostasiatische Station) was established there by the navy as the first overseas base, with a permanent presence of German warships. Until the German Empire's acquisition of Qingdao in China as a military port in 1897, Yokohama remained the base of the German fleet in East Asia. It later proved useful following the acquisition of colonies in the Pacific and in Kiaochow.

In 1869, the Rhenish Missionary Society, which had been established in southwestern Africa for several decades asked King William of Prussia for protection and suggested the establishment of a naval station at Walvis Bay. William was very interested in this suggestion, but the matter was forgotten following the outbreak of the Franco-Prussian War.

=== Debate and tentative steps under the new German Empire (1871–1878) ===
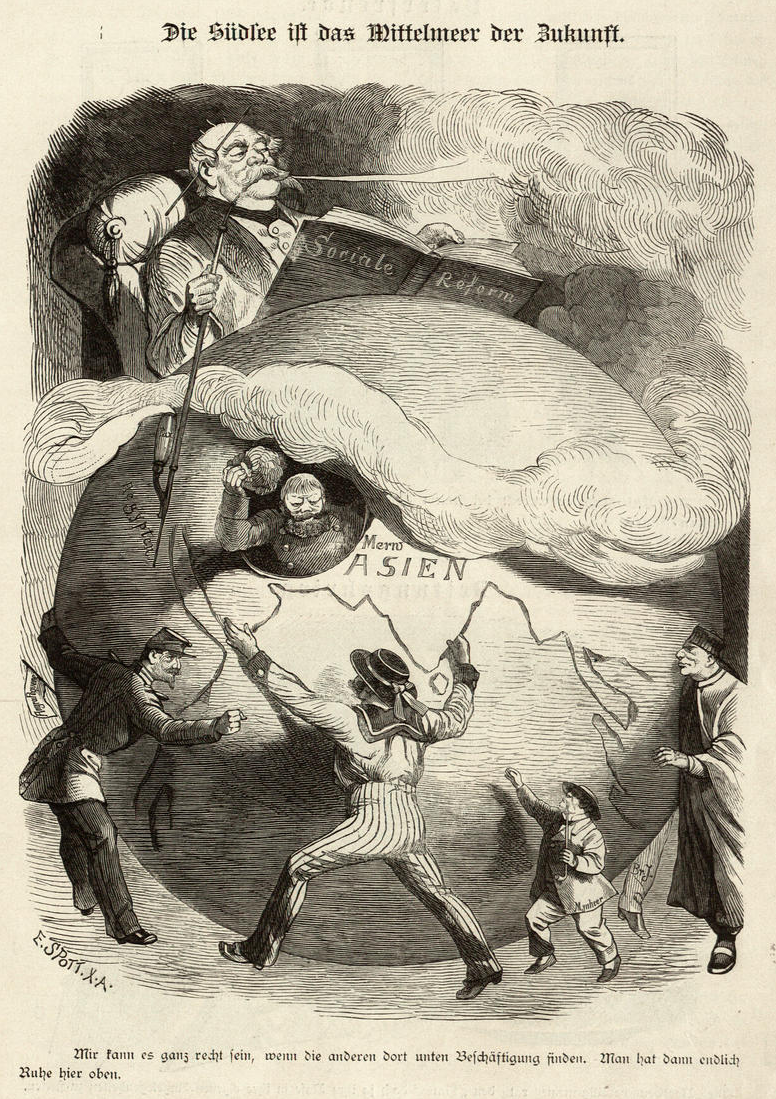
Kladderadatsch caricature, 1884. Bismarck sits atop the globe, smoking a long pipe and reading a book entitled "Social Reforms", while personifications of Britain, France, Russia, and other nations quarrel below. The title reads "The South Seas are the Mediterranean of the Future" and the caption says "I'm fine with the others keeping themselves busy down there. Then there will finally be peace up here."

A French proposal after the Franco-Prussian War to hand over the French colony of Cochinchina instead of Alsace–Lorraine, was rejected by Bismarck and a majority of the delegates in the North German Reichstag in 1870. After German Unification in 1871, Bismarck maintained his earlier position. During the 1870s, colonialist propaganda achieved increasing public profile in Germany. In 1873, the African Society in Germany was established, which considered exploration of Africa its main function. In 1878 the foundation of the Central Society for Commercial Geography and Promotion of German Interests Abroad was established, which sought to acquire colonies for Germany, and in 1881 West German Society for Colonization and Export was founded, which included the "acquisition of agricultural and commercial colonies for the German Empire" in its founding statute. In 1882, the first Society for German Colonization was established, which was a lobby group for colonialist propaganda. In 1887, the competing Society for German Colonization was established with the goal of actually undertaking colonization. The two societies merged in 1887 into the German Colonial Society. Generally, four arguments were advanced in favor of the acquisition of colonies:

- Once developed, colonies would offer captive markets for German industrial products and thus provide a substitute for the decreasing consumer demand in Germany following the Panic of 1873.
- Colonies would provide a space for the German diaspora, so that they would not be lost to the nation. Since the diaspora had mainly emigrated to English-speaking areas up to this point, the prominent colonialist Wilhelm Hübbe-Schleiden held that if they were allowed to leave, the Anglo-Saxon race would irretrievably overtake the German one demographically.
- Germany had, as the theologian Friedrich Fabri put it, a "cultural mission" to spread its supposedly superior culture across the globe.
- The acquisition of colonies provided a possible solution for the social question – workers would commit themselves to an absorbing national task and abandon social democracy. Through this and through the emigration of the overly rebellious masses to the colonies the internal unity of the nation would be strengthened.

Moreover, German public opinion in the late-19th century viewed colonial acquisitions as a true indication of having achieved full nationhood, and eventually arrived at an understanding that prestigious African and Pacific colonies went hand-in-hand with dreams of a High Seas Fleet.

Bismarck remained opposed to these arguments and preferred an informal commercial imperialism, in which German companies carried out profitable trade with areas outside Europe and made economic inroads without the occupation of territories or the construction of states. Bismarck and many deputies in the Reichstag had no interest in making colonial conquests merely to acquire square miles of territory.

As a result, the first colonial enterprises abroad were extremely hesitant: a Treaty of Friendship between the German Empire and Tonga was signed in 1876, which provided for the establishment of a coal station on the Tongan island of Vavaʻu, guaranteeing all usage rights of the specified area to the German Empire, but leaving the King of Tonga's sovereignty untouched. No actual colonization occurred. On 16 July 1878, the commander of the screw corvette SMS Ariadne, Bartholomäus von Werner occupied Falealili and Saluafata on the Samoan island of Upolu "in the name of the Empire". The German occupation of these places was revoked in January 1879 with the conclusion of a treaty of friendship between the local rulers and Germany. On 19 November 1878, von Werner established a treaty with the leaders of Jaluit Atoll and the Ralik islands of Lebon and Letahalin, granting privileges like the exclusive right to establish a coal station. An official German colony in the Marshall Islands was only established in 1885. Von Werner also acquired a harbor on the islands of Makada and Mioko in the Duke of York Islands in December 1878, which would become a component part of the future protectorate of German New Guinea in 1884. On 20 April 1879, the commander of the screw corvette SMS Bismarck, Karl August Deinhard and the German Consul for the South Seas Islands, Gustav Godeffroy Junior established a treaty of commerce and friendship with "the government" of Huahine, one of the Society Islands, which granted the German fleet the right to anchor at all harbors on the island, among other things.

== Establishment of the empire (1884–1890) ==
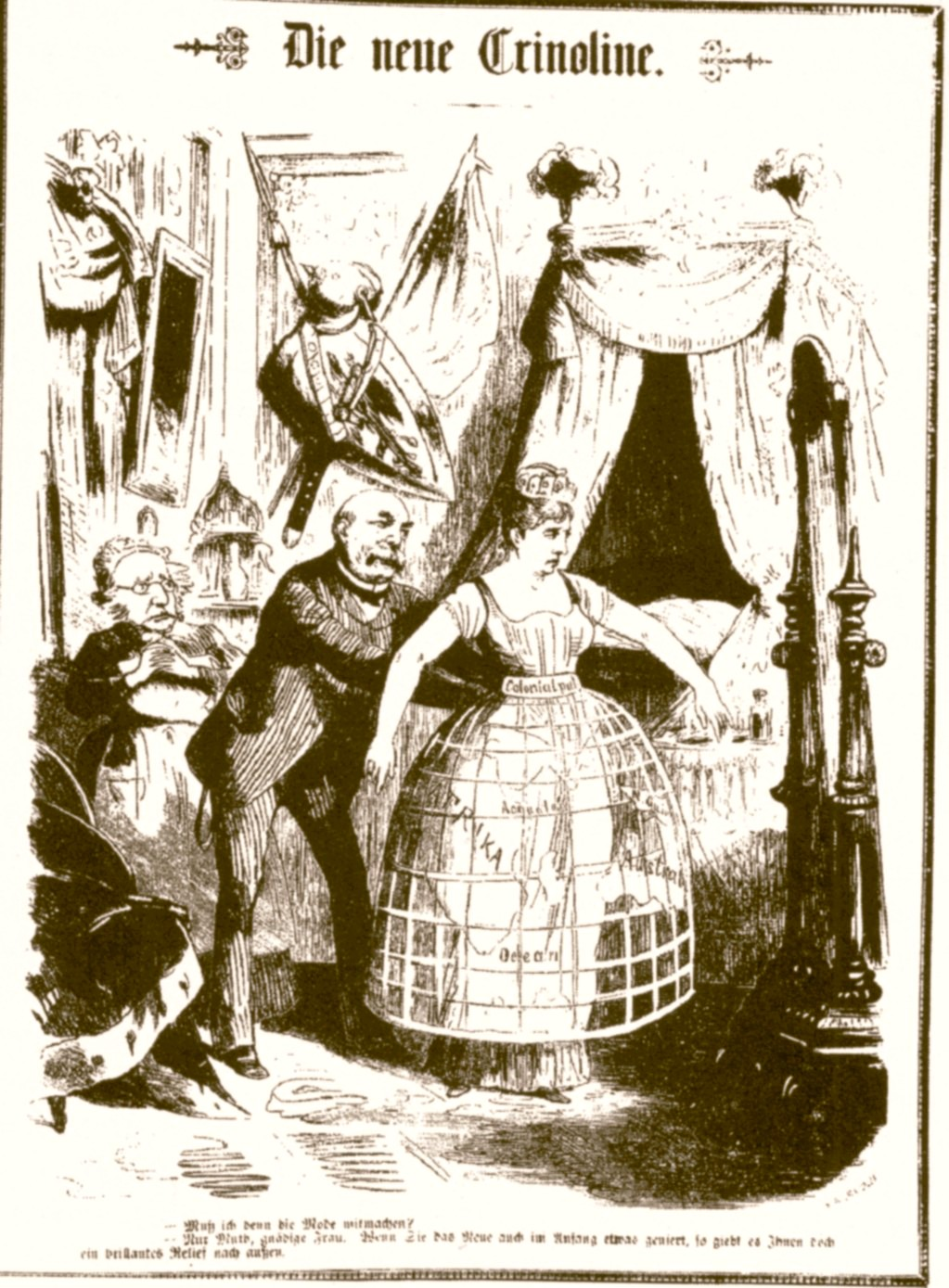
Cartoon on Bismarck's colonial policy: "The new crinoline." The caption reads: "Must I then participate in the fashion? – Have courage, good lady! Even if you are a bit embarrassed by the novel to start with, it will give you a brilliant appearance on the outside." At left in the background, the German Centrist Ludwig Windthorst is depicted as a governess. Engraving by Gustav Heil for the satirical magazine Berliner Wespen, 13 March 1885

Although Bismarck "remained as contemptuous of all colonial dreams as ever", in 1884, he consented to the acquisition of colonies by the German Empire, in order to protect trade, safeguard raw materials and export-markets and to take advantage of opportunities for capital investment, among other reasons. In the very next year Bismarck shed personal involvement when "he abandoned his colonial drive as suddenly and casually as he had started it" – as if he had committed an error in judgment that could confuse the substance of his more significant policies. "Indeed, in 1889, [Bismarck] tried to give German South West Africa away to the British. It was, he said, a burden and an expense, and he would like to saddle someone else with it."

Following 1884, Germany invaded several territories in Africa: German East Africa (including present-day Burundi, Rwanda, and the mainland part of Tanzania); German South West Africa (present-day Namibia), German Cameroon (including parts of present-day Cameroon, Gabon, Congo, Central African Republic, Chad and Nigeria); and Togoland (present-day Togo and parts of Ghana). Germany was also active in the Pacific, annexing a series of islands that would be called German New Guinea (part of present-day Papua New Guinea and several nearby island groups). The northeastern region of the island of New Guinea was called Kaiser-Wilhelmsland; the Bismarck Archipelago to the islands' east also contained two larger islands named New Mecklenburg and New Pomerania. They also acquired the Northern Solomon Islands. These islands were given the status of protectorate.

=== Bismarck moves towards a colonial policy (1878–1883) ===
The shift in Bismarck's policy on the acquisition of colonies began as part of his 1878 Schutzzollpolitik policy on the protection of the German economy from foreign competition. The beginning of his colonial policy in connection with the Schutzzollpolitik was the acquisition of Samoa, where there were significant German economic interests. In June 1879, as Imperial Chancellor, he acknowledged the "Treaty of Friendship" agreed between the Samoan chiefs and the German consul in Samoa in January 1879, with the result that the consul assumed control of the administration of the city of Apia on the island of Upolu, along with the consuls of Britain and America. In the 1880s, Bismarck would unsuccessfully attempt to annex Samoa several times. The western Samoan islands, which included Apia, the main city, became a German colony in 1899.

In April 1880, Bismarck actively intervened in domestic politics in favor of colonial matters, when he presented the Samoa Bill to the Reichstag. It had been endorsed by the Federal Council, but was rejected by the Reichstag. The bill would have provided German financial support to a private German colonial trade company that had fallen into difficulties.

In May 1880, Bismarck asked the banker Adolph von Hansemann to produce a report on German colonial goals in the Pacific and the possibility of enforcing them. Hansemann submitted his Memorandum on Colonial Aspirations in the South Seas to Bismarck in September of the same year. The proposed territorial acquisitions were almost all taken or claimed as colonies four years later. Those Pacific territories that were claimed in 1884 but not taken were finally brought under German colonial administration in 1899. Significantly, Hausemann was a founding member of the New Guinea Consortium for the acquisition of colonies in New Guinea and the Pacific in 1882.

In November 1882, the Bremen-based tobacco merchant Adolf Lüderitz contacted the Foreign Office and requested protection for a trade station south of Walvis Bay on the southwest African coast. In February and November 1883, he asked the British government whether the United Kingdom would provide protection to Lüderitz's trade station. Both times the British government refused.

From March 1883, Adolph Woermann, a Hamburg bulkgoods trader, shipowner, and member of the Hamburg Chamber of Commerce, engaged in extremely confidential negotiations with the Foreign Office, which was headed by Bismarck, for the acquisition of a colony in West Africa. The reason for this was the fear of tariffs that Hamburg traders might have to pay if the whole of West Africa were to come under British or French control. Finally, a secret request from the Chamber of Commerce to Bismarck for the establishment of a colony in West Africa was submitted on 6 July 1883, stating that "through such acquisitions, German trade in Trans-Atlantic lands could only be given a firmer position and a surer support, while without political protection trade cannot now thrive and progress."

After this, in March 1883, the Sierra Leone Convention between the United Kingdom and France was published, in which the two countries' spheres of interest were laid out without consideration of other trading nations. In response the German government asked the senates of the cities of Lübeck, Bremen, and Hamburg for their opinions. In their answer, the Hamburg merchants demanded the acquisition of colonies in West Africa. In December 1883, Bismarck let Hamburg known that an Imperial commissioner would be sent to West Africa to secure the safety of German trade and to conclude a treaty with "independent Negro states". The screw corvette Sophie would be sent to provide military protection. Additionally, Bismarck requested suggestions on this plan and asked for Adolph Woermann's advice personally on what instructions should be given to the Imperial commissioner. In March 1884, Gustav Nachtigal was named as the Imperial Commissioner for the West African Coast and set sail for West Africa in the gunboat SMS Möwe.

=== Colonization under Bismarck (1884–1888) ===
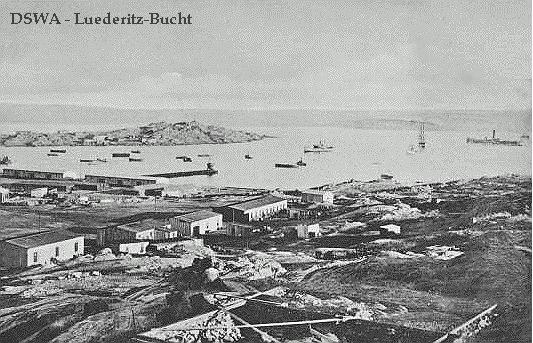
Lüderitz Bay (around 1900), the first colonial acquisition of the German Empire

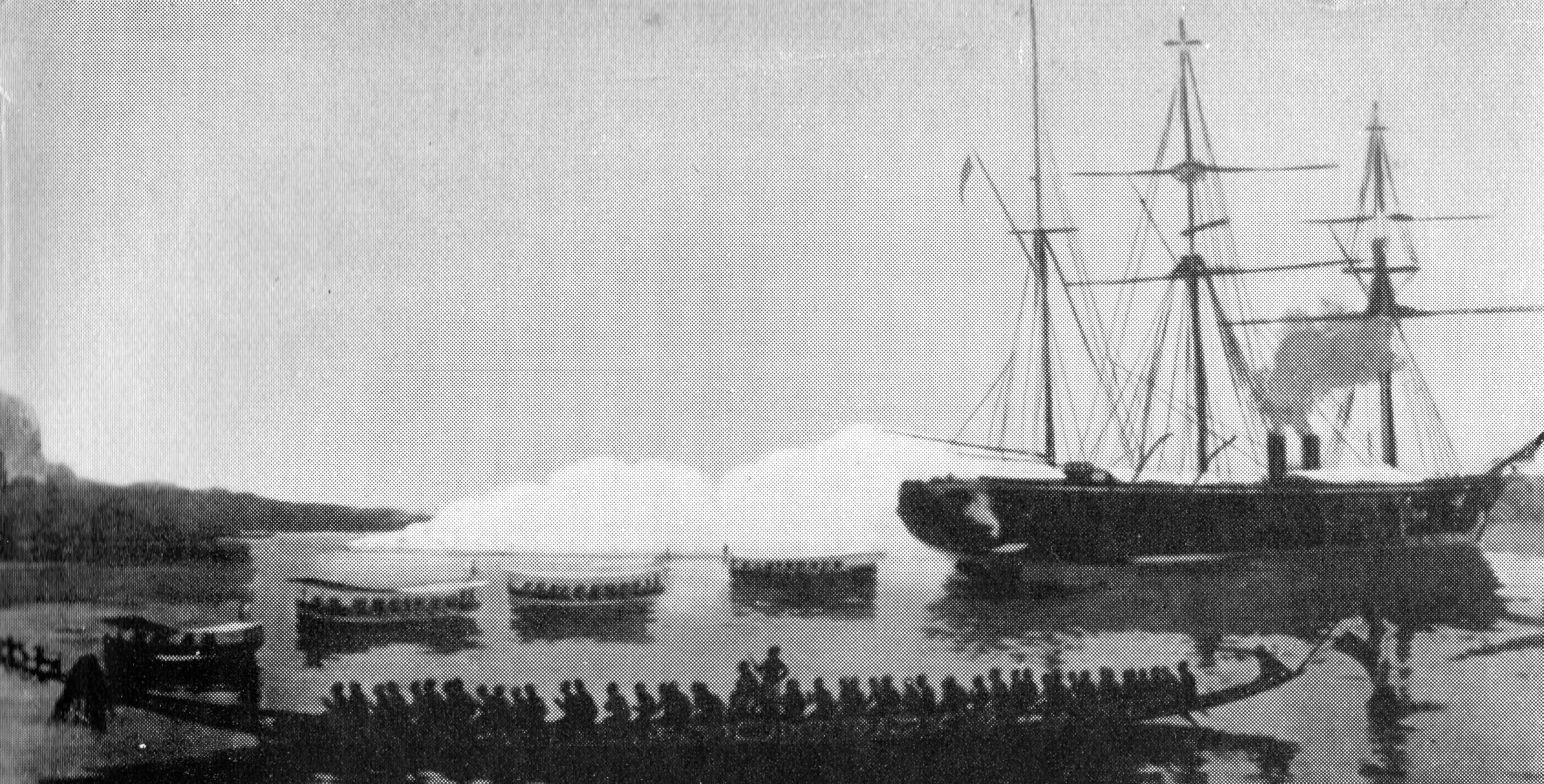
SMS Olga during the bombardment of Hickorytown (Douala), Cameroon, December 1884

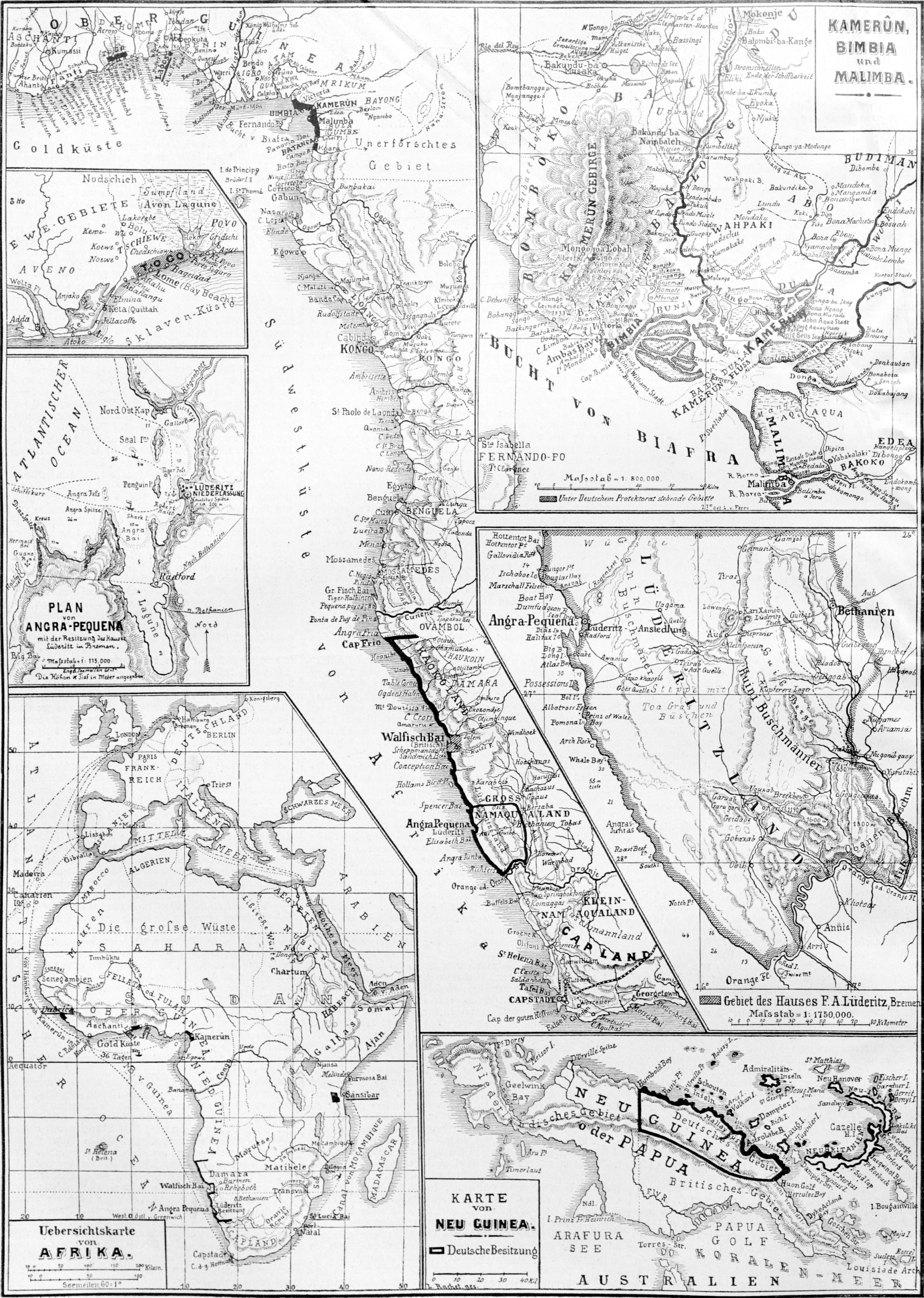
German colonies in Africa and Papua New Guinea in 1885

The year 1884 marks the beginning of actual German colonial acquisitions, building on the overseas possessions and rights that had been acquired for the German Empire since 1876. In one year, Germany's holdings became the third-largest colonial empire, after the British and French empires. Following the British model, Bismarck placed many possessions of German merchants under the protection of the German empire. He took advantage of a period of foreign peace to begin the "colonial experiment", which he remained skeptical of. The transition to official acceptance of colonialism and to colonial government thus occurred during the last quarter of Bismarck's tenure of office.

First, Adolf Lüderitz's trading post in the Bay of Angara Pequena ('Lüderitz Bay') and the surrounding hinterland ('Lüderitzland') was placed under the protection of the German Empire in April 1884 as German South West Africa. In July, Togoland and Adolph Woermann's possessions in Cameroon followed, then the northeastern section of New Guinea ('Kaiser-Wilhelmsland') and the neighboring islands ('the Bismarck Archipelago'). In January 1885, the German flag was raised at Kapitaï and Koba on the west African coast. In February, imperialist and "man-of-action" Carl Peters accumulated vast tracts of land for his Society for German Colonization, "emerging from the bush with X-marks [affixed by unlettered tribal chiefs] on documents ... for some 160,000 km^{2} (60,000 mi^{2}) of the Zanzibar Sultanate's mainland property." which became German East Africa. Such exploratory missions required security measures that could be solved with small private, armed contingents recruited mainly in the Sudan and usually led by adventurous former military personnel of lower rank. Brutality, hanging and flogging prevailed during these land-grab expeditions under Peters' control as well as others as no-one "held a monopoly in the mistreatment of Africans", and in April 1885, the brothers Clemens and Gustav Denhardt acquired Wituland in modern Kenya. With this, the first wave of German colonial acquisitions was largely completed.

The raising of German flags on Pacific islands claimed by Spain between August and October 1885 sparked the Carolines Crisis, in which Germany ultimately backed down.

In October 1885, the Marshall Islands were also claimed and finally several of the Solomon Islands in October 1886. In 1888, Germany ended the civil war on Nauru and annexed the island.

==== Causes ====
The causes of Bismarck's sudden shift to a policy of colonial acquisition remain a matter of controversy among historians. There are two dominant schools of thought: one which focuses on German domestic politics and one which focuses on foreign affairs.

In terms of internal politics, the key aspect is the public pressure which led to the development of a "Colonial fever" (Kolonialfieber) among the German populace. Although the colonial movement was not very strong institutionally, it succeeded in bringing its position into the public debate. A memorandum authored by Adolph Woermann and sent to Bismarck by the Hamburg Chamber of Commerce on 6 July 1883 is considered to have been particularly important in this respect. The approach of the 1884 German federal election and Bismarck's desire to strengthen his own position and bind the National Liberal Party, which supported colonialism, to himself, have also been proposed as domestic factors in the adoption of the colonial policy. Hans-Ulrich Wehler advanced the social imperialism thesis, which holds that the colonial expansion served to "divert" social tensions created by economic crisis to the foreign sphere and helped to reinforce Bismarck's authority. The so-called "Crown-prince thesis" holds that Bismarck was attempting to deliberately worsen the German relationship with the United Kingdom before the anticipated succession of the "anglophile" Frederick III to the German throne in order to prevent him from instituting liberal English-style policies.

In terms of foreign policy, the decision to colonize is seen as an extension of the concept of the European balance of power to a global context. Participating in the Scramble for Africa would also reinforce its position as one of the Great Powers. Improving relations with France through a "colonial entente" that would divert French attention from revanchism related to Alsace-Lorraine, which had been annexed by Germany in 1871, has also been seen as a motive.

==== Company land acquisitions and stewardship ====
It is no longer believed that the initiation of colonial expansion represented a radical reversal of Bismarck's politics. The liberal-imperialist ideal of an overseas policy grounded in private economic initiatives, which he had held from the beginning, was not changed much by placing German merchants' possessions under the protection of the Empire.

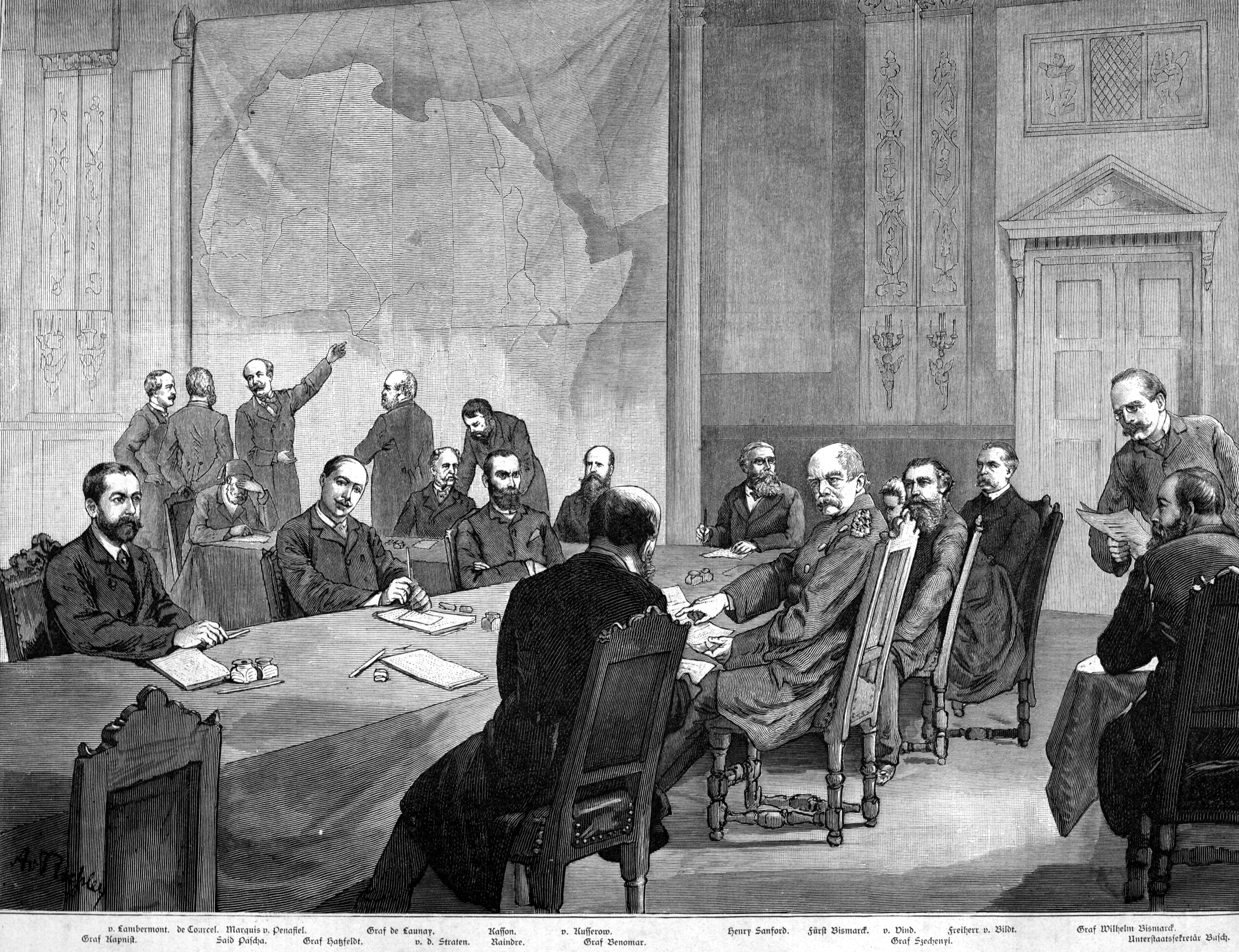
The Congo conference 1884/1885 in Berlin laid the basis for the Scramble for Africa, the colonial division of the continent.

As Bismarck was converted to the colonial idea by 1884, he favored "chartered company" land management rather than establishment of colonial government due to financial considerations. He used official letters of protection to transfer the commerce and administration of individual "German protectorates" to private companies. The administration of these areas was assigned to the German East Africa Company (1885–1890), the German Witu Company (1887–1890), the German New Guinea Company (1885–1899), and the Jaluit Company in the Marshall Islands (1888–1906). Bismarck would have liked the German colonies in west Africa and southwest Africa to be administered in this way as well, but neither the Deutsche Kolonialgesellschaft für Südwestafrika nor the Syndicate for West Africa were willing to take on the role.

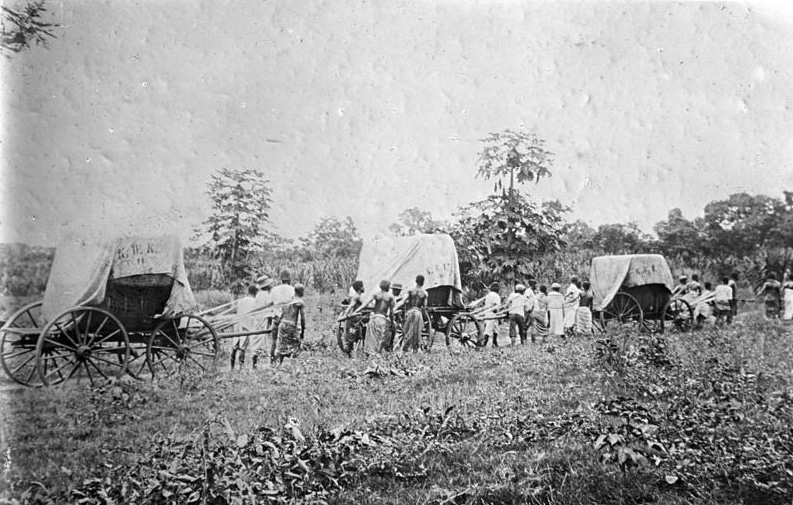
Cotton transport in Togo, c. 1900. Coffee, cacao, cotton, and products from the coconut palm were pretty much the only goods produced for the German and international markets in Togo, as in the other German tropical colonies.

These areas were brought into German possession with extremely unequal treaties following demonstrations of military power. Indigenous rulers ceded vast areas, which they often had no legal claim to, in exchange for vague promises of protection and laughably low purchase prices. Details of the treaties often remained unclear to them due to the language barrier. They engaged with these deals, however, because the long negotiations with the colonizers and the ritual act of signing a treaty enormously enhanced their authority. These treaties were approved by the German government, which granted complete authority without oversight to the colonial companies, while retaining for itself only ultimate sovereignty and a few unspecified rights to intervene. In this way, state financial and administrative engagement with the colonies was kept to a minimum.

However, this strategy failed within a few years. The poor financial situation of almost all of the "protectorates" as well as the precarious security situation (indigenous revolts broke out in South West Africa and East Africa in 1888, while in Cameroon and Togo border conflicts with the neighboring British colonies were feared, and in general the demands of efficient administration overwhelmed the colonial companies) compelled Bismarck and his successors to implement direct and formal rule in all the colonies.

Although temperate zone cultivation flourished, the demise and often failure of tropical low-land enterprises contributed to changing Bismarck's view. He reluctantly acquiesced to pleas for help to deal with revolts and armed hostilities by often powerful rulers whose lucrative slaving activities seemed at risk. German native military forces initially engaged in dozens of punitive expeditions to apprehend and punish freedom fighters, at times with British assistance. The author Charles Miller offers the theory that the Germans had the handicap of trying to colonize African areas inhabited by aggressive tribes, whereas their colonial neighbors had more docile peoples to contend with. At that time, the German penchant for giving muscle priority over patience contributed to continued unrest. Several of the African colonies remained powder kegs throughout this phase (and beyond).

=== Halt to colonial acquisitions (1888–1890) ===
After 1885, Bismarck opposed further colonial acquisitions and maintained his policy focus on maintaining good relationships with the Great Powers of England and France. In 1888, when the journalist Eugen Wolf urged him to acquire further colonies for Germany, so that it would not fall behind in the scramble with the other Great Powers for colonies, which he understood in a social Darwinian sense, Bismarck replied that his priority was rather the protection of the recently won national unity, which he considered to be under threat due to Germany's central location:

Your map of Africa is very pretty, but my map of Africa lies in Europe. Here is Russia, here is France, and we are in the middle. That is my map of Africa.

In 1889, Bismarck considered withdrawing Germany from colonial policy, wishing to entirely end Germany's activities in East Africa and Samoa, according to eyewitnesses. It was further reported that Bismarck wanted nothing more to do with the administration of the colonies and intended to hand them over to the admiralty. In May 1889, Bismarck offered to sell the German possessions in Africa to the Italian Prime Minister, Francesco Crispi – who countered with an offer to sell Italy's colonies to Germany.

Bismarck also found the colonies useful as bargaining chips. At the Congo Conference held in Berlin from 1884 to 1885, Africa was divided up between the Great Powers. In 1884, a treaty was concluded in the name of Lüderitz with the Zulu king Dinuzulu, which would have given Germany a claim to St Lucia Bay in Zululand. However, the claim was dropped as part of a concession to Britain in May 1885, along with a claim to Pondoland. Also in 1885, Germany waived its claim to the west African territories of Kapitaï and Koba and Mahinland, in favor of France and Britain respectively. In 1886, Germany and Britain agreed on the boundaries of their spheres of interest in East Africa.

After Bismarck had ended the policy of colonial acquisition in March 1890, he concluded the Heligoland–Zanzibar Treaty with Britain on 1 July 1890, in which Germany renounced all remaining claims north of German East Africa. In this way, he established a balance with Great Britain. Renouncing the German claims to the Somali coast between Burgabo and Alula also improved relations with Italy, one of Germany's partners in the Triple Alliance. In exchange for this, Germany acquired the Caprivi Strip, which extended German South West Africa east to the Zambezi River (it was hoped that the river would enable overland transport between German South West Africa and German East Africa). In these circumstances, further German colonial aspirations in South East Africa were brought to an end.

German interest in African colonies was accompanied by a growth of scholarly interest in Africa. In 1845, the orientalist Heinrich Leberecht Fleischer of Leipzig University and others founded the Deutsche Morgenländische Gesellschaft. The linguist Hans Stumme, also of Leipzig, researched African languages. Leipzig established a professorship of Anthropology, Ethnography, and Pre-history in 1901 (Karl Weule, who established an ethnological and biological determinist school of African research) and a professorship for "Colonial geography and colonial policy" in 1915. The researcher Hans Meyer was director of the "Institute for Colonial Geography". In 1919, the Seminar for Colonial geography and colonial policy" was established.

== The empire under Kaiser Wilhelm II (1890–1914) ==
Kaiser Wilhelm II (1888–1918) was keen for Germany to expand its colonial holdings. Bismarck's immediate successor in 1890, Leo von Caprivi, was willing to maintain the colonial burden of what already existed, but opposed new ventures. Others who followed, especially Bernhard von Bülow, as foreign minister and chancellor, sanctioned the acquisition of further Pacific Ocean colonies and provided substantial treasury assistance to existing protectorates to employ administrators, commercial agents, surveyors, local "peacekeepers" and tax collectors. This accorded with the expansionistic policy and a forced upgrade of the Imperial German Navy. Colonial acquisition became a serious factor in German domestic politics. The German colonial society was joined in 1891 by the extremely nationalistic Pan-German League. In addition to the arguments previously made in support of colonialism, it was now argued that Germany had a duty to end the slave trade in the colonies and free indigenous people from their Muslim enslavers. These abolitionist demands, with their clear anti-Muslim bias turned the 1888 "Arab revolt" on the East African coast into a holy war. Pre-eminent, however, was the matter of German national prestige and the belief that Germany was locked in a Social Darwinist competition with the other Great Powers, in which Germany as a "late-comer" had to claim her due share.

Wilhelm himself lamented his nation's position as colonial followers rather than leaders. In an interview with Cecil Rhodes in March 1899, he stated the alleged dilemma clearly: "... Germany has begun her colonial enterprise very late, and was, therefore, at the disadvantage of finding all the desirable places already occupied." Under the new Weltpolitik ("Global policy"), a "place in the Sun" was sought for the "latecoming nation" (as the chancellor Bernhard von Bülow put it in a speech to the Reichstag on 6 December 1897), which entailed the possession of colonies and a right to have a say in other colonial matters. This policy focussed on national prestige sharply contrasted with the pragmatic colonial policy advanced by Bismarck in 1884 and 1885.

=== Acquisitions after 1890 ===
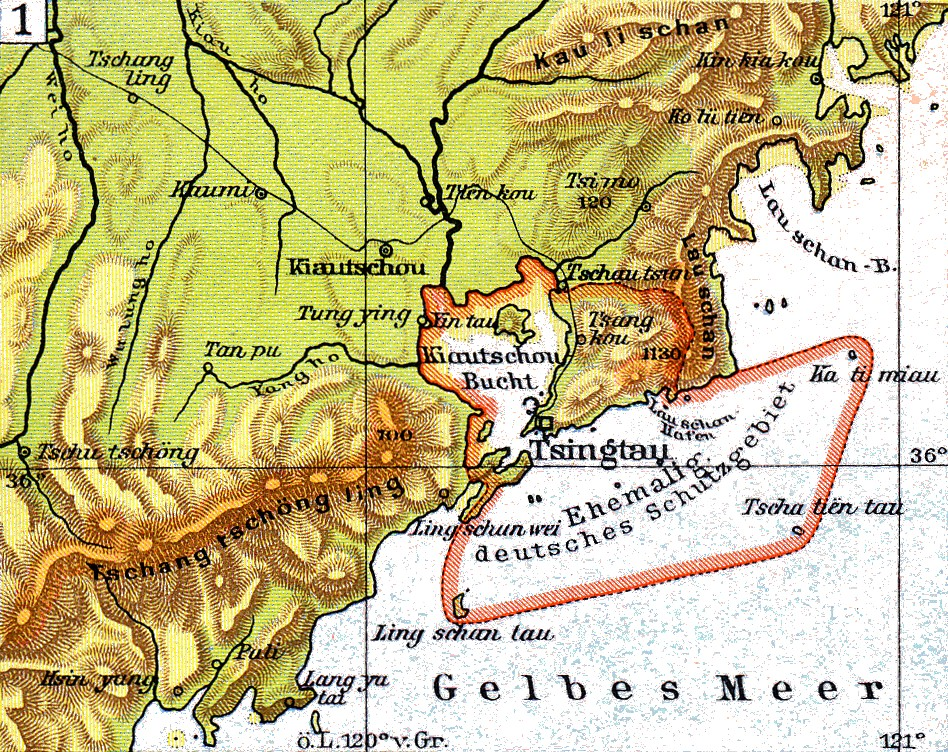
The German-leased territory of Kiautschou and the port of Qingdao

After 1890, Germany succeeded in acquiring only relatively minor territories. In 1895, concessions were acquired from Qing China in Hankau and Tientsin (modern Wuhan and Tianjin). Following the Juye Incident of 1 November 1897, in which two German missionaries from the Society of the Divine Word were murdered, Kaiser Wilhelm dispatched the East Asia Squadron to occupy Jiaozhou Bay and its chief port Qingdao on the southern coast of the Shandong peninsula. This became the Kiautschou Bay Leased Territory and the area within 50 km of Jiaozhou Bay became a "Neutral Zone" in which Chinese sovereignty was limited in favor of Germany. Furthermore, Germany received mining and railway concessions in Shandong province.

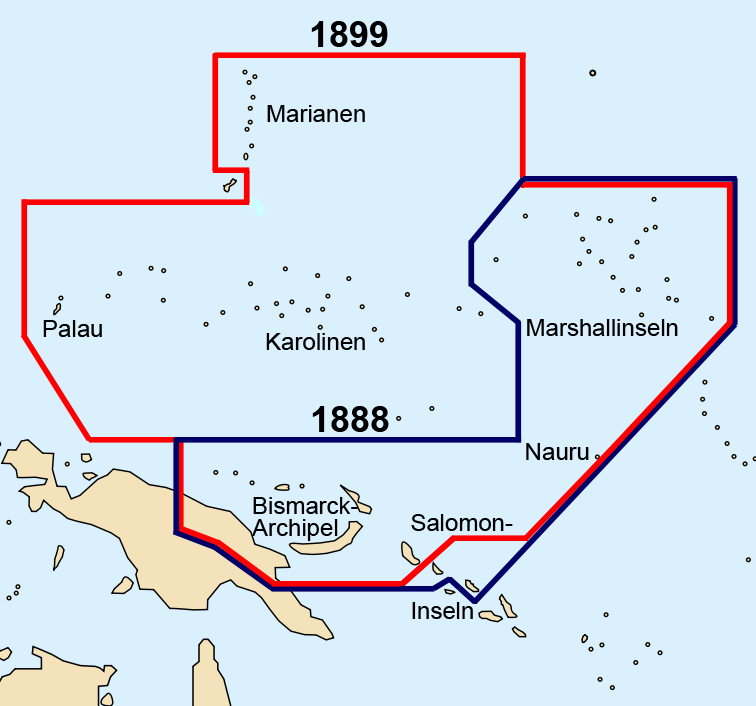
Borders of German New Guinea before (in blue) and after (in red) the 1899 German-Spanish Treaty

Through the German–Spanish Treaty of 1899, Germany acquired the Caroline Islands, Mariana Islands, and Palau in Micronesia for 17 million gold marks. Through the Tripartite Convention of 1899, the west part of the Samoan islands became a German protectorate. Simultaneously, the control of existing colonies was extended inland; for example the kingdoms of Burundi and Rwanda were added to German East Africa. However, from 1891, German efforts in this regard encountered sharp resistance in the Bafut Wars in Cameroon and the conflict with the Hehe in East Africa.

The German journalist and adventurer Theodor Lerner visited the Arctic Bear Island, Svalbard, 1898 and 1899 and claimed rights of ownership. In 1899, the German fishery association Deutscher Seefischerei-Verein (DSV) started investigations of whaling and fishery in the Barents Sea. The DSV was secretly in contact with the German naval command and considered the possibility of an occupation of Bear Island. In reaction to these advances, the Russian Navy sent out the protected cruiser Svetlana to investigate, and the Russians hoisted their flag over Bear Island on 21 July 1899. Although Lerner protested the action, no violence occurred and the matter was settled diplomatically with no definitive claims of sovereignty over Bear Island by any nation.

On 6 March 1901, as part of preparatory work by the Imperial postal service for laying a German underwater telegraph cable, the colonial official Arno Senfft took possession of Sonsorol island. The next day, he also claimed the islands of Merir and Pulo Anna, followed on 12 April by the island of Tobi and the Helen Reef. These islands were placed under the administration of German New Guinea.

In 1900, the Imperial Navy attempted to lease the island of Langkawi from the Sultan of Kedah for fifty years through the Behn Meyer company, based in Singapore. The deal fell through when the British government intervened based on a secret 1897 treaty with Siam which gave England the right to veto any Siamese concessions to a third power, so Kedah, which was a vassal of the Bangkok government, was prevented from loaning Langkawi to the German government. The Kaiser's attempt to acquire the Baja California peninsula from Mexico as another naval base for the German fleet in the Pacific also failed.

Kamerun, annexed to French Cameroon Kamerun, annexed to British Northern Cameroons Kamerun, annexed to British Southern Cameroons Neukamerun, annexed to French Equatorial Africa Kamerun, annexed to French Chad

During the Agadir Crisis in 1911, the German government attempted to get the whole of French Congo as compensation for German recognition of the French protectorate in Morocco. In the end they were given parts of northwestern French Congo, which were added to German Cameroon and dubbed Neukamerun. This acquisitive German colonial policy led to the increasing isolation of Germany among the Great Powers, seen in Germany as an "encirclement".

For the academic development of the colonies, the Kolonialwirtschaftliches Komitee was established in 1896. In 1898, the Deutsche Kolonialschule für Landwirtschaft, Handel und Gewerbe was established in Witzenhausen, to provide agricultural training to people for settlement in the colonies. It is now part of the University of Kassel. In 1900, the Institute for Naval and Tropical Medicine was established in Hamburg to train naval and colonial doctors.

Of the German colonies, only Togoland and German Samoa became profitable and self-sufficient; the balance sheet for the colonies as a whole revealed a fiscal net loss for Germany. Despite this, the leadership in Berlin committed the nation to the financial support, maintenance, development and defense of these possessions.

From 1911 until July 1914, the German and British governments had held negotiations about the possibility of annexing Portuguese Angola. In such a case most of the colony would fall into the hands of the Germans. Angola-Bund, founded in 1912, was the German organization promoting the takeover.

=== Anti-colonial resistance (1897–1905) ===
The forcefulness with which the German colonial rulers imposed their claim to control led to ever more revolts by the indigenous population. The native population was forced into unequal treaties by the German colonial governments. This led to the local tribes and natives losing their influence and power and eventually forced some of them to become slave laborers. The result was several military and genocidal campaigns by the Germans against the natives. Both the colonial authorities and settlers were of the opinion that native Africans were to be a lower class, their land seized and handed over to settlers and companies, while the remaining population was to be put in reservations; the Germans planned to make a colony inhabited predominantly by whites: a "new African Germany".

Since the Germans were materially and technologically superior but had only a minimal military presence, the indigenous peoples largely adopted guerrilla tactics. The German colonial forces reacted similarly to other cases of asymmetric warfare involving colonial powers: they waged war against the whole population. In a scorched earth strategy, they destroyed villages, prevented economic activity, and withheld any protection against wild animals. Through these actions, they forced the population to flee into inhospitable regions, where many starved to death. Through this conscious strategy, the Germans caused lasting changes to the whole landscape, making it uninhabitable for decades.

The most significant of these actions against local populations were reprisals against the Chinese following the Boxer Rebellion in 1901–1902, the Herero and Nama genocide in 1904–1905, and the suppression of the Maji Maji Rebellion in 1905–1907.

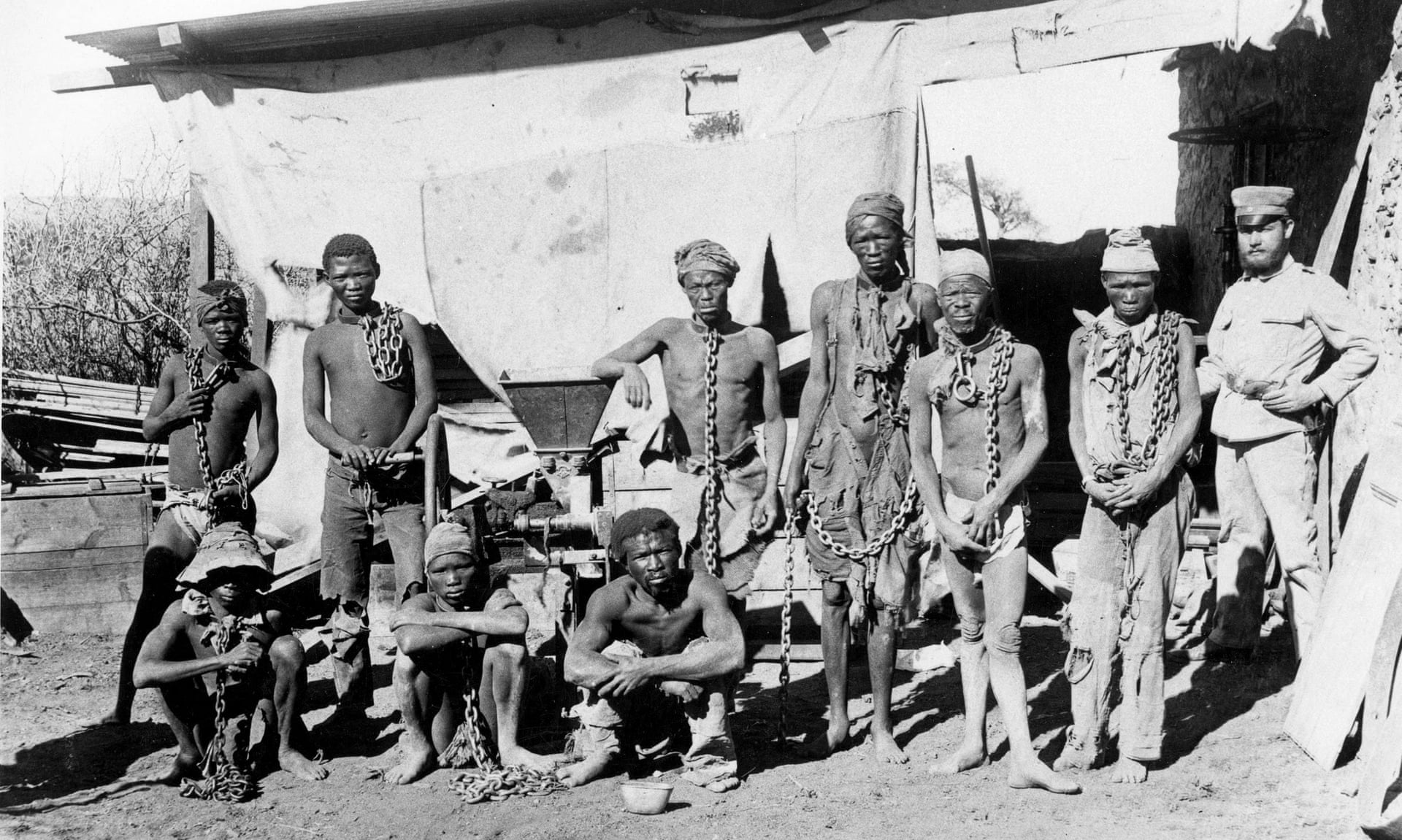
A photograph of chained Herero and Nama prisoners during the genocide

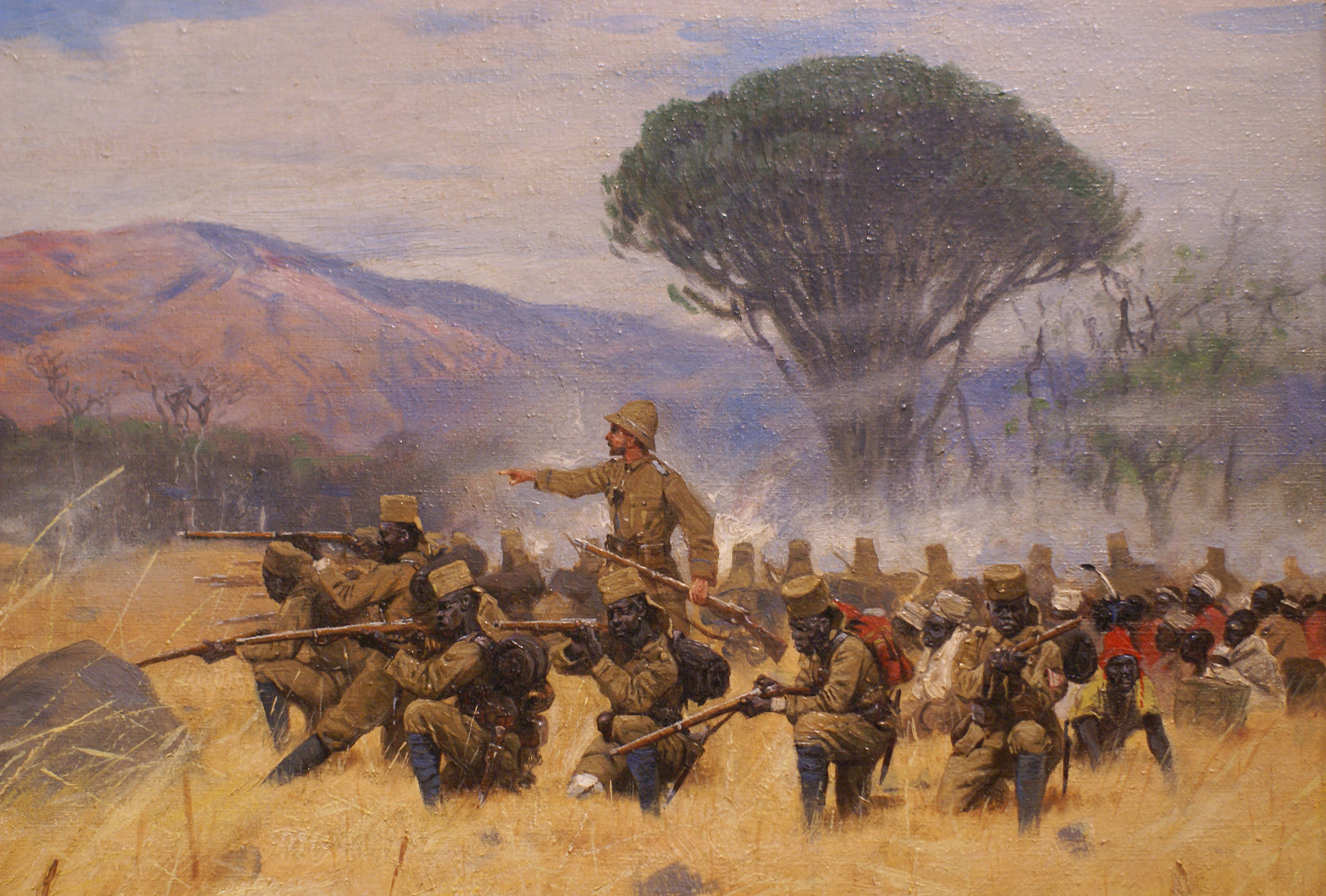
"Battle of Mahenge", Maji-Maji rebellion, painting by Friedrich Wilhelm Kuhnert, 1908

After the outbreak of a cattle disease in South West Africa in 1897, the Herero spread their surviving cattle out over the area of the colony. However, these new pastures had been bought by settlers, who now claimed the Herero's cattle for themselves. In 1904, the situation finally escalated into the revolt of the Herero and the Nama, which the understaffed Imperial Schutztruppe for German South West Africa were not able to quell. The German government therefore dispatched a naval expeditionary force and subsequently reinforcement Schutztruppe. In total, around 15,000 men under Lieutenant-general Lothar von Trotha defeated the Herero forces in August 1904 at the Battle of Waterberg. Von Trotha issued the so-called "extermination order" (Vernichtungsbefehl), under which the surviving Herero were driven into the wilderness. 1800 of the survivors had reached British Bechuanaland by the end of November 1904, while thousands more fled to the northernmost parts of South West Africa, and into the desert. At this time, the Herero population was estimated at 50,000, of which around half had died by 1908. The Nama suffered 10,000 deaths, also around half of their population. They had fought on the German side against the Herero until the end of 1904. This was the first genocide of the 20th century.

The Maji-Maji rebellion broke out in German East Africa in 1905/6 and its suppression led to an estimated 100,000 native deaths, many from famine resulting from German scorched earth tactics.

The lack of any true war in Togoland led some in Europe to call it Germany's "model colony." But it saw its own share of bloodshed. The Germans used forced labor and harsh punishment to keep the Africans in line.

To minimize dissent the German Colonial Press Law (written 1906–1912) kept the pugnacious settler press under control with censorship and prohibition of unauthorized publications. However, in Togoland, African writers avoided the law by publishing critical articles in the adjacent British Gold Coast Colony. In the process they built an international network of sympathizers. Exposés followed in the print media throughout Germany of the Herero rebellions in 1904 in German South West Africa (Namibia today) where in military interventions between 50% and 70% of the Herero population perished, known as the Herero and Nama genocide. The subduing of the Maji Maji uprising in German East Africa in 1905 was prominently published. The rejection of a supplementary budget to provide further funding for colonial conflicts at the end of 1906 led to the dissolution of the Reichstag and new elections. "A wave of anti-colonial feeling began to gather momentum in Germany" and resulted in large voter turnouts in the so-called "Hottentot election" for the Reichstag in January 1907. The conservative Bülow government barely survived, but in January 1907 the newly elected Reichstag imposed a "complete overhaul" upon the colonial service.

=== New colonial policies (1905–1914) ===
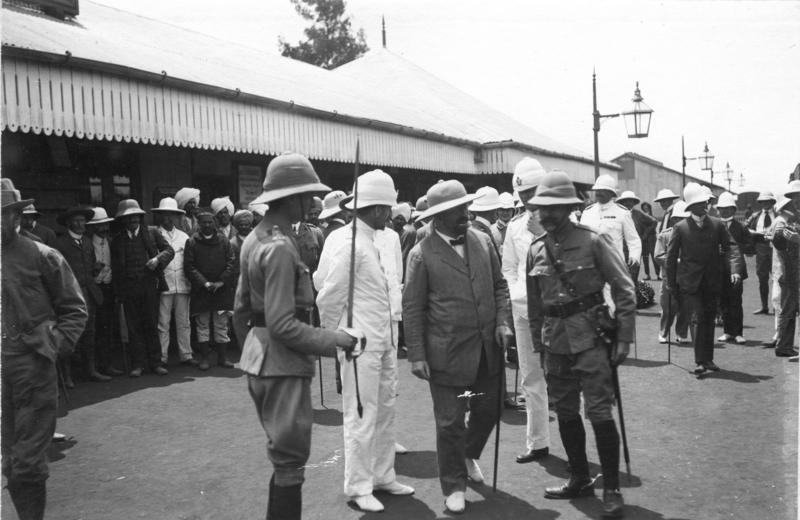
German Colonial Secretary Bernhard Dernburg (2nd from right) on an inspection tour in East Africa, with British officials at Nairobi in 1907

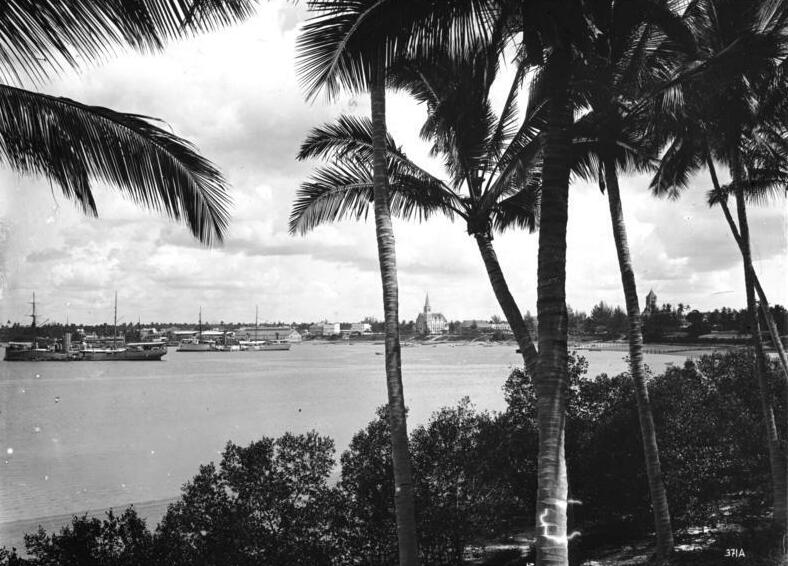
Port of Dar es Salaam, German East Africa, c. 1910

As a result of the colonial wars in South West Africa and East Africa, which had been caused by poor treatment of native peoples, it was considered necessary to change the German colonial administration, in favor of a more scientific approach to the employment of the colonies that improved the lives of the people in them. Therefore, the highest authority in colonial administration, the Colonial Department (Kolonialabteilung) was separated from the Foreign Office and, in May 1907, it became its own ministry, the Imperial Colonial Office (Reichskolonialamt).

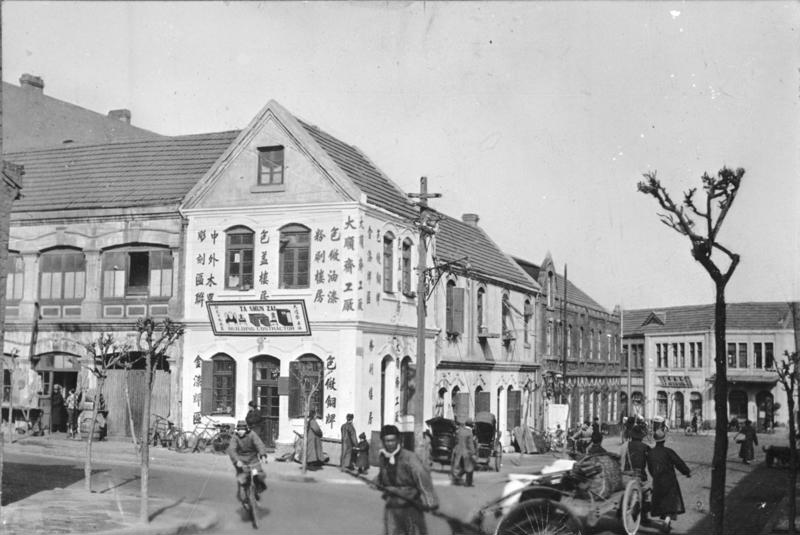
Tsingdao with German buildings, c. 1900

The creator of the new colonial policy was a banker and private-sector restructurer, Bernhard Dernburg from Darmstadt, who was placed in charge of the Colonial Department in September 1906 and retained the role as Secretary of State of the revamped Colonial Office until 1910. Entrenched incompetents were screened out and summarily removed from office and "not a few had to stand trial. Replacing the misfits was a new breed of efficient, humane, colonial civil servant, usually the product of Dernburg's own creation, the ... Colonial Institute at Hamburg." In African protectorates, especially Togoland and German East Africa, "improbably advanced and humane administrations emerged." Dernburg went on tours of the colonies, to learn about their problems first-hand and find solutions. Capital investments by banks were secured with public funds of the imperial treasury to minimize risk. Dernburg, as a former banker, facilitated such thinking; he saw his commission to also turn the colonies into paying propositions. He oversaw large-scale expansion of infrastructure. Every African protectorate built rail lines to the interior. Dar es Salaam evolved into "the showcase city of all of tropical Africa," Lomé grew into the "prettiest city in western Africa", and Qingdao in China was, "in miniature, as German a city as Hamburg or Bremen". Whatever the Germans constructed in their colonies was made to last. Scientific and technical institutions for colonial purposes were established or expanded, in order to develop the colonies on these terms. Two of these, the Hamburg Colonial Institute and the German Colonial School are predecessor organizations of the modern universities of Hamburg and Kassel.

Dernburg declared that the indigenous population in the protectorates "was the most important factor in our colonies" and this was affirmed by new laws and initiatives. Corporal punishment was abolished. Every colony in Africa and the Pacific established the beginnings of a public school system, and every colony built and staffed hospitals. In some colonies, native agricultural holdings were encouraged and supported. In January 1909, Derburg said "The goal must be colonies closely bound to the Fatherland, administratively independent, intellectually self-sufficient, and healthy."

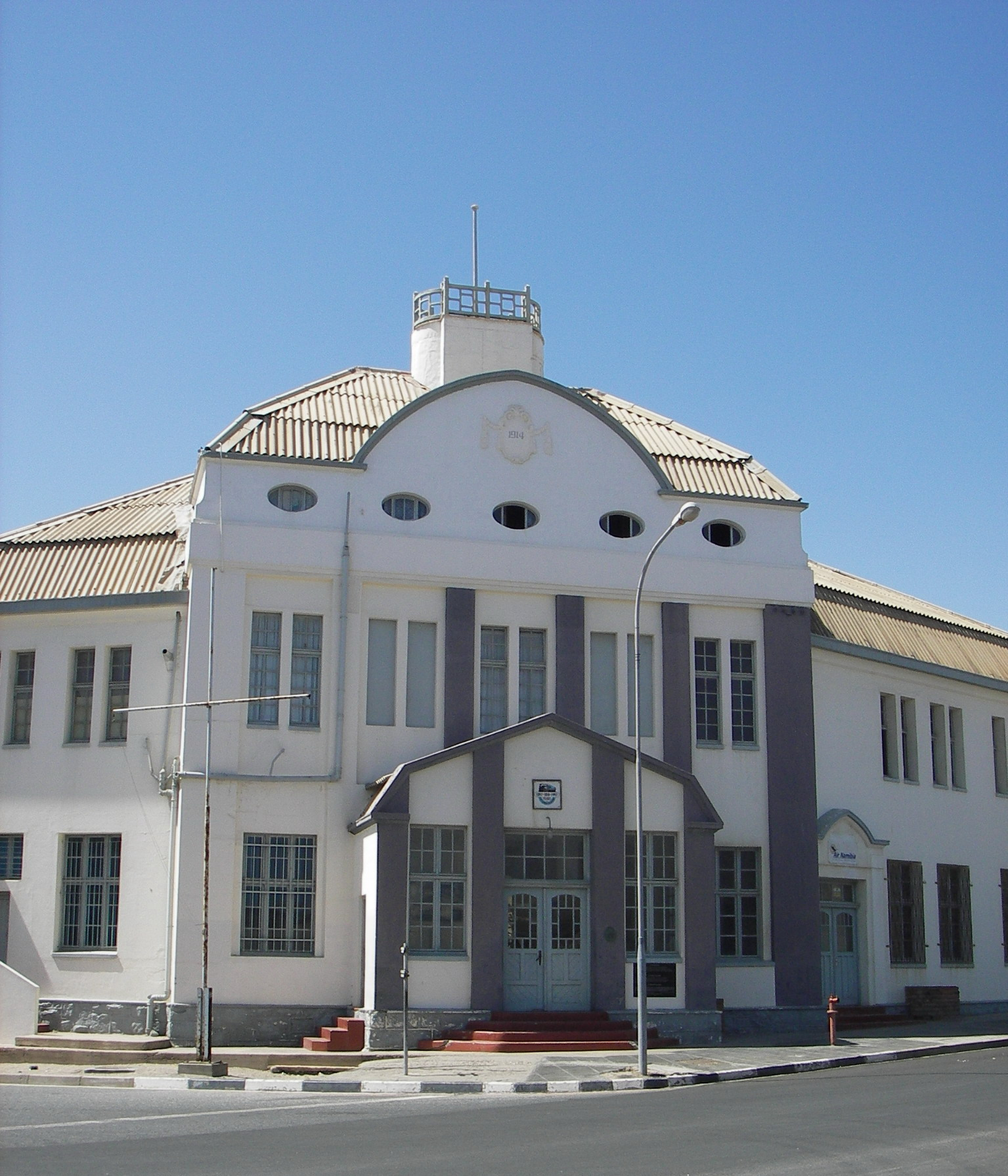
Railway station (1914) in Lüderitz, Namibia, pictured in 2006

Wilhelm Solf, who was Colonial Secretary from 1911 until 1918, also undertook tours in Africa in 1912 and 1913. The resulting impressions informed his colonial plans, which included an expansion of the powers of the governors and a ban on forced labor for Africans. As governor of Samoa, he had referred to the islanders as "unsere braunen Schützlinge" (our brown charges), who could be guided but not forced. Similarly, Heinrich Schnee, governor of East Africa from 1912, proclaimed that "the dominant feature of my administration [will be] ... the welfare of the natives entrusted into my care." Solf also advocated a network of motorways in the colonies. He secured support for this comparatively peaceful colonial policy, instead of the highly militarized approach that had been taken up to this point, from all parties in the Reichstag, except for the right.

There were no further major revolts in the German colonies after 1905 and the economic efficiency of the overseas possessions rapidly increased, as a result of these new policies and improvements in shipping, especially the establishment of scheduled services with refrigerated holds, increased the amount of agricultural products from the colonies, exotic fruits and spices, that were sold to the public in Germany. Between 1906 and 1914, the production of palm oil and cocoa in the colonies doubled, the rubber production of the African colonies quadrupled, and the cotton exports from German East Africa increased tenfold. The total trade between Germany and its colonies increased from 72 million marks in 1906 to 264 million marks in 1913. Due to this economic growth, the income from colonial taxes and duties increased sixfold. Instead of being dependent on financial support from Germany, the colonies became or were on track to become financially independent. By 1914, only German New Guinea, Kiautschou, and the African Schutztruppen were subsidized. "The colonial economy was thriving ... and roads, railways, shipping and telegraph communications were up to the minute."

The colonies were romanticized. Geologists and cartographers explored what were then unmarked regions on European maps, identifying mountains and rivers, and demarcating boundaries. Hermann Detzner and one Captain Nugent, R. A., had charge of a joint project to demarcate the British and German frontiers of Cameroon, which was published in 1913. Travelers and newspaper reporters brought back stories of black and brown natives serving German managers and settlers. There were also suspicions and reports of colonial malfeasance, corruption and brutality in some protectorates, and Lutheran and Roman Catholic missionaries dispatched disturbing reports to their mission headquarters in Germany.

Idealists often volunteered for selection and appointment to government posts; the commercially minded, to grow dividends at home for the Hanseatic trading houses and shipping lines. Subsequent historians would commend German colonialism in those years as "an engine of modernization with far-reaching effects for the future."

Postcards depicted romanticized images of natives and exotic locales, such as this early 20th-century card of the German colonial territory in New Guinea.

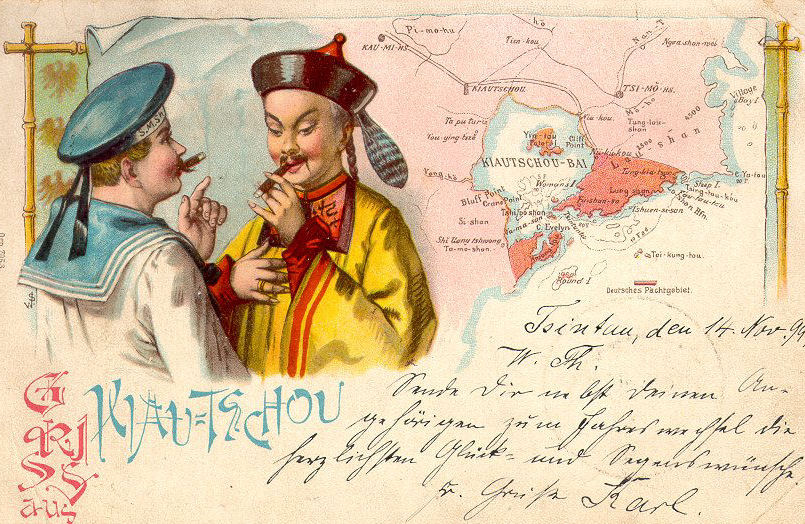
Colonial postcard from Qingdao, c. 1900

== End of the German colonial empire (1914–1918) ==
=== Conquest in World War I ===
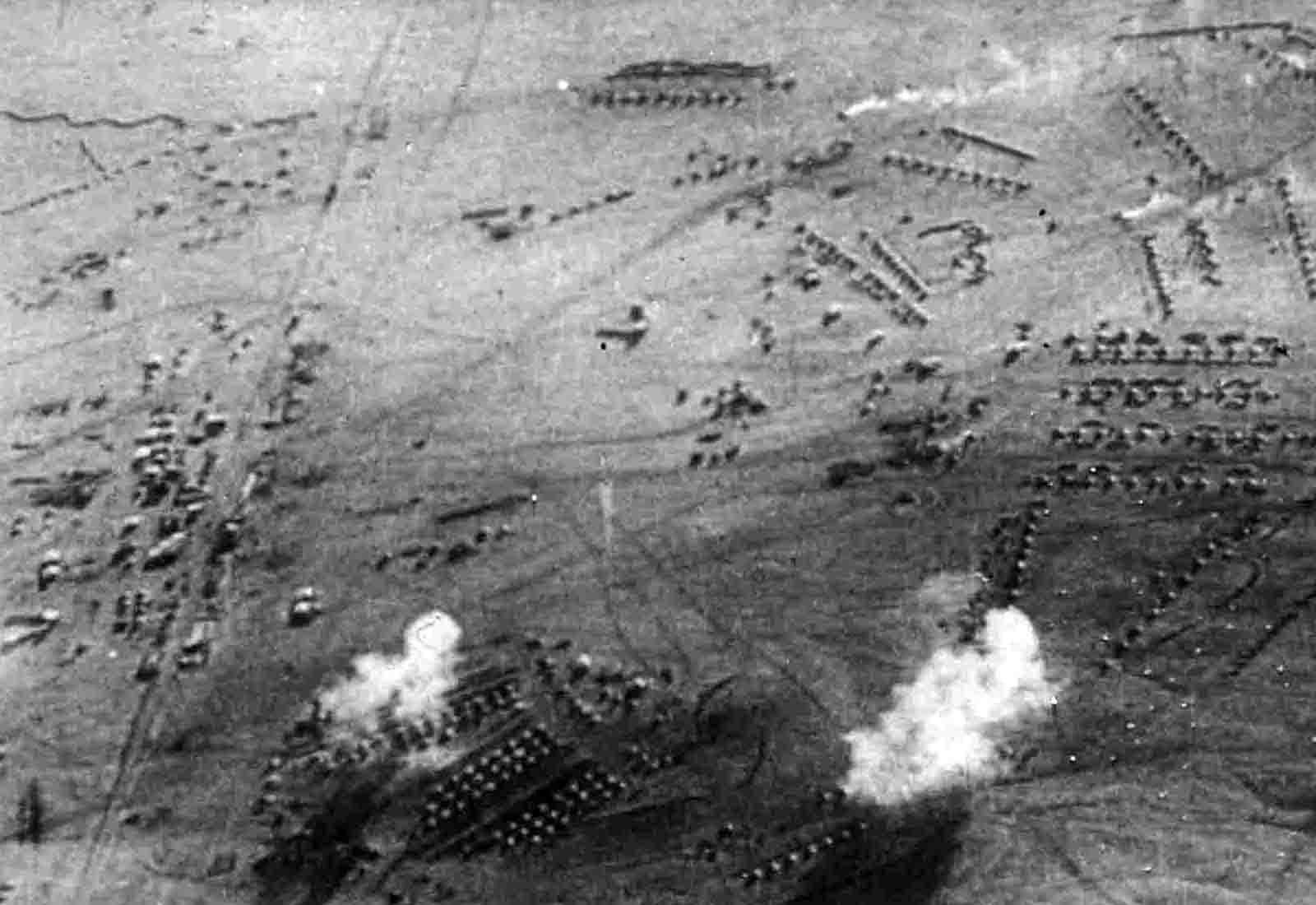
Austrian lieutenant Paul Fiedler bombarding a South African military camp at the railway station of Tschaukaib, German South West Africa, December 1914

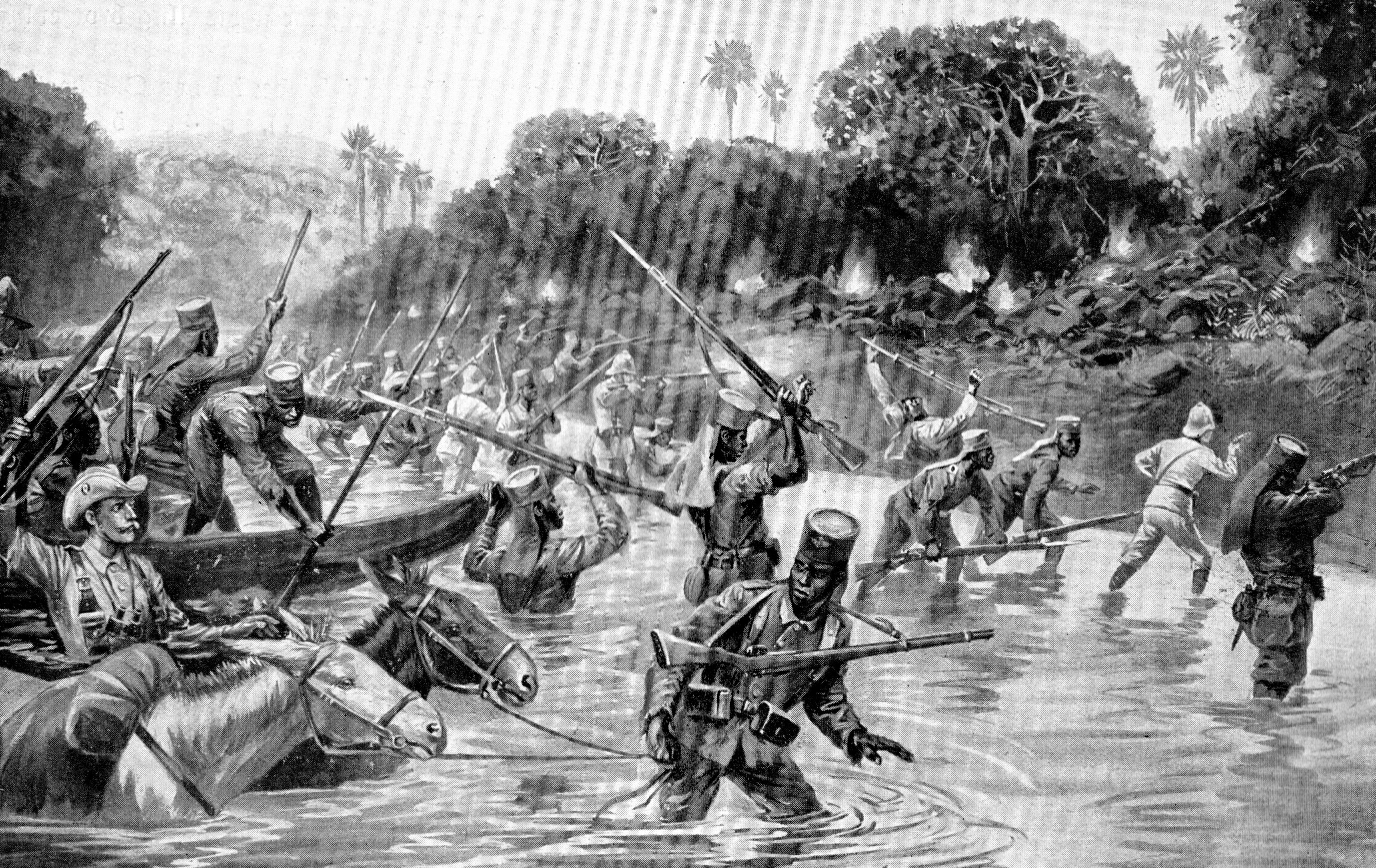
General Paul von Lettow-Vorbeck's troops defeat Portugal at Ngomano, Portuguese East Africa on 25 November 1917.

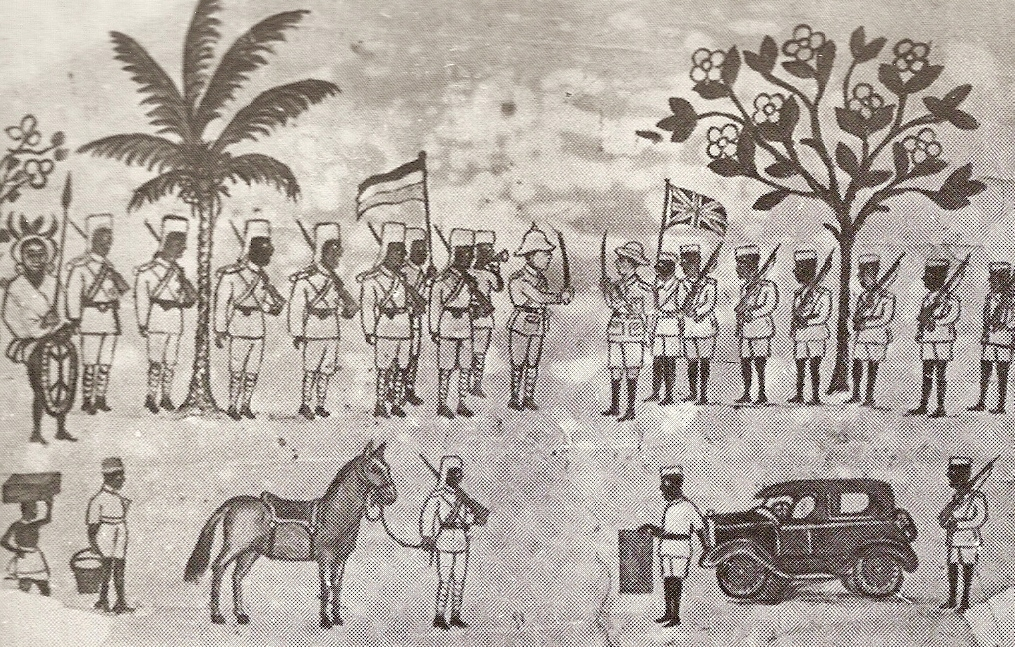
Paul von Lettow-Vorbeck's force stops fighting the Allies on 25 November 1918 after the Armistice.

The colonial government of German East Africa minted 15-rupee gold coins in 1916, during the East African campaign, to address the wartime shortage of coinage caused by the Allied blockade.

In the years before the outbreak of the World War, British colonial officers viewed the Germans as deficient in "colonial aptitude", but "whose colonial administration was nevertheless superior to those of the other European states". Anglo-German colonial issues in the decade before 1914 were minor and both the British and German empires took conciliatory attitudes toward one another. Foreign Secretary Sir Edward Grey—still considered a moderate in 1911—was willing to "study the map of Africa in a pro-German spirit". Britain further recognized that Germany really had little of value to offer in territorial transactions; however, advice to Grey and Prime Minister H. H. Asquith hardened by early 1914 "to stop the trend of what the advisors considered Germany's taking and Britain's giving."

Once war was declared in late July 1914 Britain and its allies promptly moved against the colonies. The public was informed that German colonies were a threat because "Every German colony has a powerful wireless station – they will talk to one another across the seas, and at every opportunity they [German ships] will dash from cover to harry and destroy our commerce, and maybe, to raid our coasts." The British position that Germany was a uniquely brutal and cruel colonial power originated during the war; it had not been said during peacetime. The German overseas Colonies began to fall one by one to the allied forces. The first to go was Togoland to the British and to the French. Germany's colonies put up a stout fight but by 1916 Germany lost most of its colonies, except German East Africa, where a German force of General Paul von Lettow-Vorbeck held out against the Allies until the end of the war.

The German possessions in the Pacific were largely undefended and were seized by Allied forces in the first months of the war, aided by the withdrawal of the German Navy's East Asia Squadron. Troops from New Zealand invaded German Samoa in August 1914, while Australian troops occupied German New Guinea the following month and later seized Nauru. Japanese troops occupied the German possessions in Micronesia in October 1914, including the Mariana, Caroline and Marshall Islands.

South Africa's J. C. Smuts, now in Britain's small War Cabinet, spoke of German schemes for world power, militarization and exploitation of resources, indicating Germany threatened western civilization itself. While propaganda was said about both sides it was here in Africa where Germany saw a crushing defeat. It was at Togoland where the Germans were quickly outnumbered leaving them to flee the capital which led to a large pursuit of German forces by allied armies leading to the eventual surrender of German forces on 26 August 1914. Smuts' warnings were repeated in the press. The idea took hold that they should not be returned to Germany after the war.

=== Confiscation ===
Germany's overseas empire was dismantled following defeat in World War I. With the concluding Treaty of Versailles, Article 22, German colonies were transformed into League of Nations mandates and divided between Belgium, the United Kingdom and certain British Dominions, France and Japan with the determination not to see any of them returned to Germany – a guarantee secured by Article 119.

In Africa, the United Kingdom and France divided German Kamerun (Cameroons) and Togoland. Belgium gained Ruanda-Urundi in northwestern German East Africa, the United Kingdom obtained by far the greater landmass of this colony, thus gaining the "missing link" in the chain of British possessions stretching from South Africa to Egypt (Cape to Cairo), and Portugal received the Kionga Triangle, a sliver of German East Africa. German South West Africa was taken under mandate by the Union of South Africa. In terms of the population of 12.5 million people in 1914, 42 percent were transferred to mandates of Britain and its dominions, 33 percent to France, and 25 percent to Belgium.

In the Pacific, Japan gained Germany's islands north of the equator (the Marshall Islands, the Carolines, the Marianas, the Palau Islands) and Kiautschou in China. German Samoa was assigned to New Zealand; German New Guinea, the Bismarck Archipelago, and Nauru went to Australia as mandates.

British placement of surrogate responsibility for former German colonies on white-settler dominions was at the time determined to be the most expedient option for the British government – and an appropriate reward for the Dominions having fulfilled their "great and urgent imperial service" through military intervention at the behest of and for Great Britain. It also meant that British colonies now had colonies of their own – which was very much influenced at the Paris proceedings by W. M. Hughes, William Massey, and Louis Botha, the prime ministers of Australia, New Zealand and South Africa. The principle of "self-determination" embodied in the League of Nations covenant was not considered to apply to these colonies and was "regarded as meaningless". To "allay President [Woodrow] Wilson's suspicions of British imperialism", the system of "mandates" was drawn up and agreed to by the British War Cabinet (with the French and Italians in tow), a device by which conquered enemy territory would be held not as a possession but as "sacred trusts". But "far from envisaging the eventual independence of the [former] German colonies, Allied statesmen at the Paris Conference regarded 1919 as the renewal, not the end, of an imperial era." In deliberations the British "War Cabinet had confidence that natives everywhere would opt for British rule"; however, the cabinet acknowledged "the necessity to prove that its policy toward the German colonies was not motivated by aggrandizement" since the Empire was seen by America as a "land devouring octopus" with a "voracious territorial appetite".

President Wilson saw the League of Nations as "'residuary trustee' for the [German] colonies" captured and occupied by "rapacious conquerors". The victors retained the German overseas possessions and did so with the belief that Australian, Belgian, British, French, Japanese, New Zealand, Portuguese and South African rule was superior to Germany's. Several decades later during the collapse of the then existing colonial empires, Africans and Asians cited the same arguments that had been used by the Allies against German colonial rule – they now simply demanded "to stand by themselves".

== Colonialism after 1918 ==
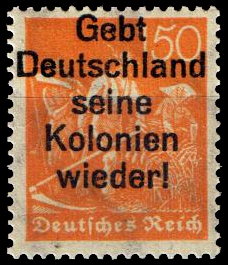
Stamp from 1921, "Give Germany its colonies back!"

In Germany after the First World War, the general public opinion was that the seizure of the colonies had been unlawful and that Germany had a right to its colonies. Nearly all the parties elected to the Weimar National Assembly on 19 January 1919, voted in favor of a resolution which demanded the return of the colonies on 1 March 1919, i.e. while the Paris Peace Conference was still in progress. Only seven delegates from the USPD voted against it. The charge that Germany had failed to "civilize" the peoples under its control was seen as particularly outrageous – this had played a central role in German colonialism's self-legitimation. This protest achieved nothing – in the final version of the Treaty of Versailles, Germany was required to give up all its colonies. With the exception of German Southwest Africa, where some descendants of German settlers still live today (the German Namibians), all Germans were required to leave the colonies.

=== Weimar Republic ===
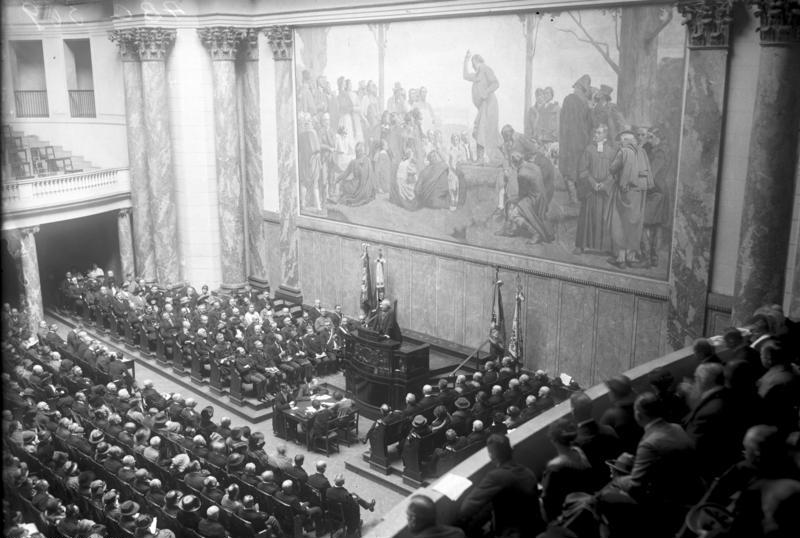
Colonial Memorial Day on 24 April 1924 at the Humboldt University of Berlin, celebrating the 40th anniversary of the declaration of the Southwest African protectorate

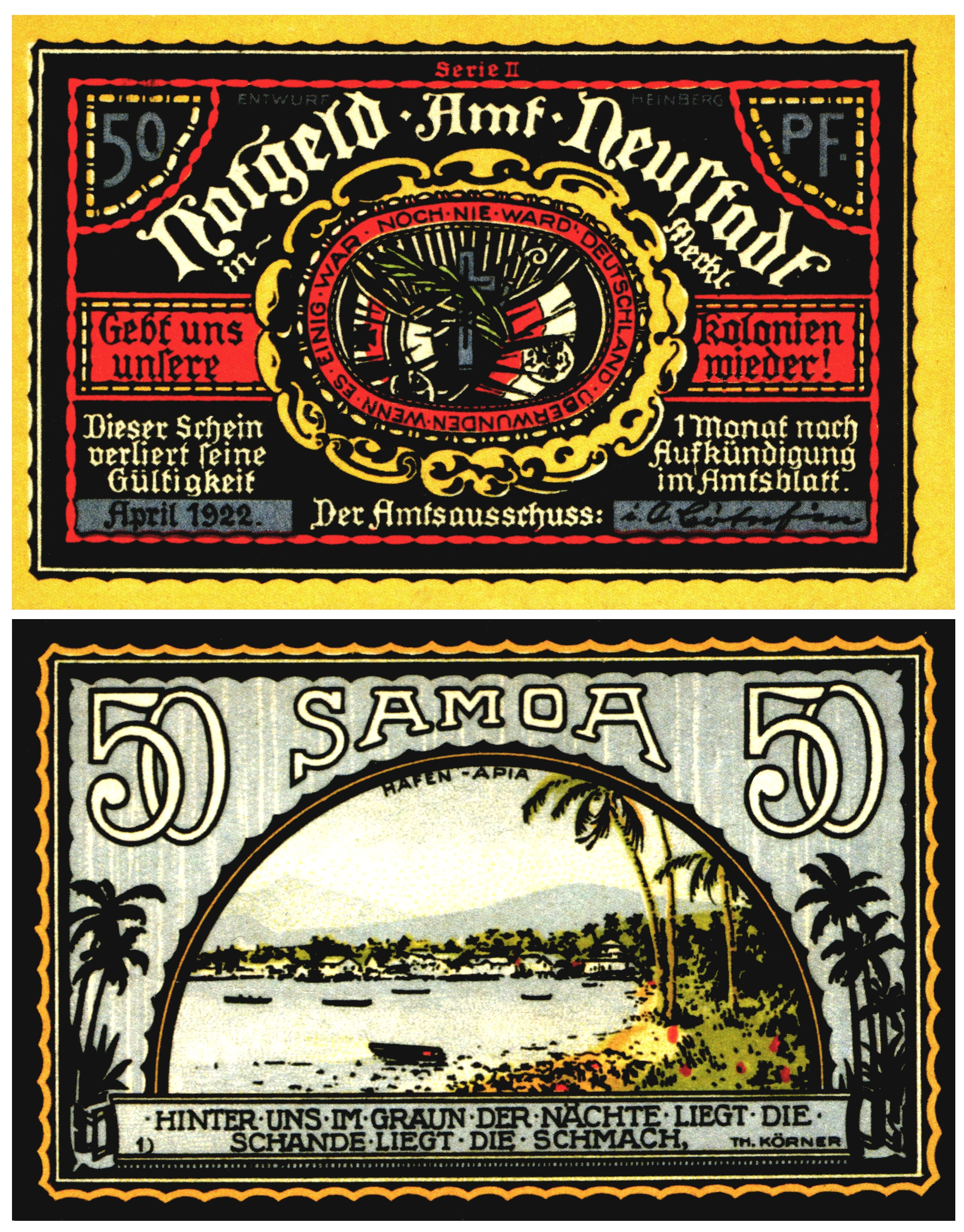
Notgeld of 1922, "Give us our colonies back! – Samoa."

Even in the early phase of the Weimar Republic, there were voices calling for the return of the colonies – among them Konrad Adenauer, who was then mayor of Cologne. Adenauer was Deputy President of the German Colonial Society from 1931 to 1933. From 1924 there was a Colonial Office in the Federal Foreign Office, directed by Edmund Brückner, the former Governor of Togo. Brückner's policy was that the return of Togo, Cameroon, and German East Africa were the most likely. In 1925, the Colonial Imperial Society ('Korag') was established as an umbrella organization, from which the Reichskolonialbund emerged in 1933. Also in 1925, Johannes Bell, who had been Colonial Minister in the Scheidemann cabinet, founded the "Interparty Colonial Union", which included members of the whole political spectrum, from the Nazi party to the SPD. In 1925, some settlers also returned to their plantations in Cameroon, which they had bought the previous year with financial support from the Foreign Office. In anticipation of the recovery of the colonies, the Colonial Women's School of Rendsburg was founded in 1926. In 1931, an Institute for Foreign and Colonial Forestry was founded at the Royal Saxon Academy of Forestry.

The treaty of Versailles attributed war guilt to Germany, but most Germans did not accept this and many saw the confiscation of the colonies by the Allies as a theft, especially after the South African premier Louis Botha stated that all allegations which the Allies had published during the war about the German colonial empire were, without exception, baseless fabrications. German colonial revisionists spoke of a "Colonial Guilt Myth."

=== Nazi period (1933–1945) ===
Chancellor Adolf Hitler's speeches sometimes did mention return of the lost colonies, as a bargaining point, but at all times his real target was Eastern Europe. In 1934, the Nazi Party established its own Office of Colonial Policy, which was led by Heinrich Schnee, and then Franz Ritter von Epp and was a very active grass roots organization. The Reichskolonialbund, established in 1936, under Franz Ritter von Epp absorbed all colonial organizations and was meant to raise procolonial sentiments, and build public interest in former German colonies. However, no new overseas colonial enterprises took place and with the onset of World War II in 1939 the organization entered a decline. It was disbanded by decree in 1943 for "activity irrelevant to the war". Although it tolerated the colonialists, the Nazi government focused on territorial gains inside Europe. At no time did it negotiate or demand from London or Paris the return of any lost colony. According to Willeke Sandler: "Between 1933 and 1943, Rudolf Hess, Martin Borman, and Joachim von Ribbentrop, among others, hindered colonialists' publicity activities, seeing them as representative of a discarded past and as irrelevant when compared with Eastern European 'Lebensraum.'"

== Administration and colonial policies ==
=== Colonial administration ===
Political diagram of the German Empire and its colonies

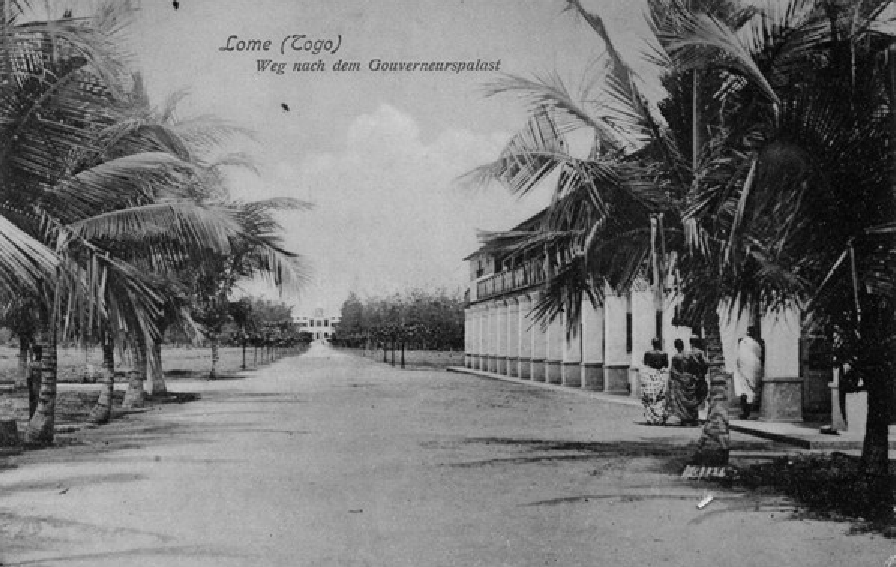
The way to the governor's palace in Togo, 1904

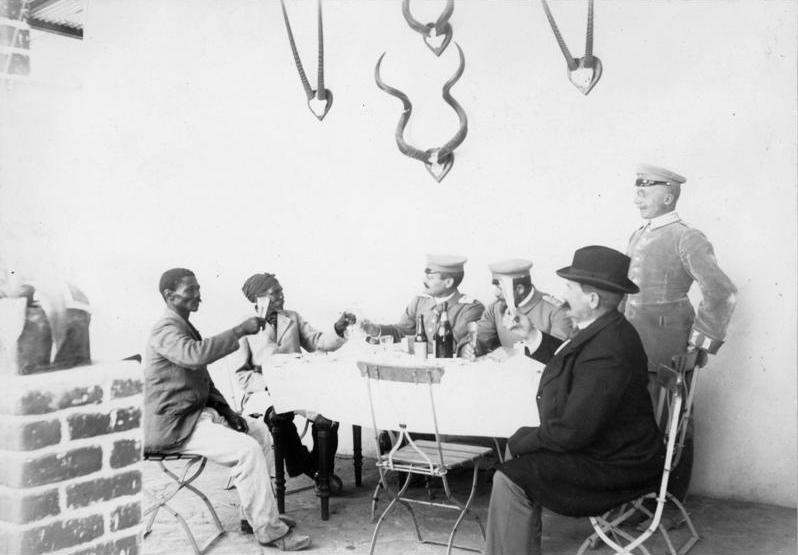
Hendrik Witbooi with the German governor Theodor Leutwein of South West Africa (toasting to each other), 1896

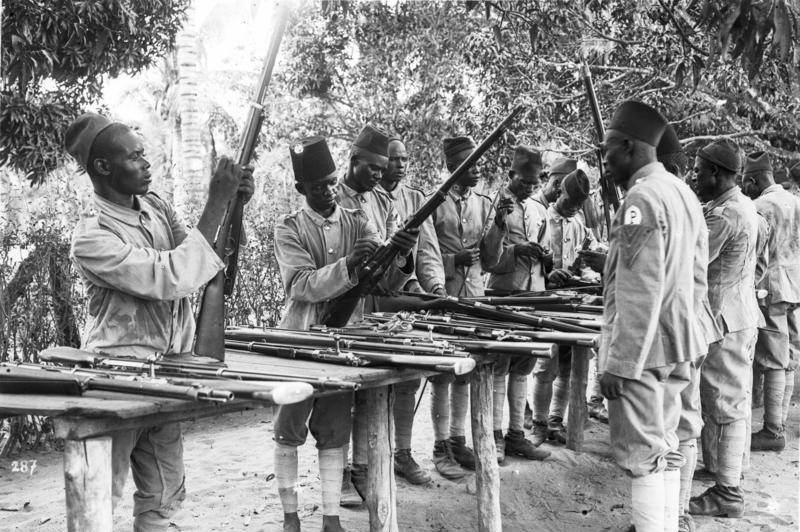
Askari troops in German East Africa, c. 1906

Between 1890 and 1907, the uppermost leadership of the empire's protectorates (Schutzgebiete) was the Colonial Division (Kolonialabteilung) of the Foreign Office (Auswärtiges Amt), which was headed by the Imperial Chancellor. In 1907, the Colonial Division was separated from the Foreign Office and became its own ministry (Amt), called the Imperial Colonial Office (Reichskolonialamt), with Bernhard Dernburg as its state secretary.

By an Imperial decree of 10 October 1890, the Colonial Council (Kolonialrat) was placed alongside the Colonial Division. It contained representatives of the Colonial Societies and experts appointed by the Chancellor.

The German treaty port of Kiautschou was administered by the Imperial Naval Office (Reichsmarineamt), not the Foreign Office or the Colonial Office.

The highest legal authority for the colonies was the Reichsgericht (Imperial Court of Justice) in Leipzig.

The legal situation in the colonies was first regulated by the 1886 law concerning the legal relationships of the German protectorates, which became the Protectorate Law (Schutzgebietsgesetz) in 1900 after further changes. It introduced German law in the German colonies for Europeans, through consular jurisdiction. The Consular Jurisdiction Law (Konsulargerichtsbarkeitsgesetz ) of 1879 had granted German consuls overseas jurisdiction over German citizens in specific circumstances. The Protectorate Law specified that the regulations on consular jurisdiction would also apply in the colonies. In so far as they were relevant to consular jurisdiction, therefore, various important legal provisions of civil law, criminal law, legal procedure, and due process also came into force in the colonies. Alongside this, over time, further special provisions of colonial law were established. For indigenous people in the colonies, the Kaiser initially held all legislative power. Over the following years, the Imperial Chancellor and other officials empowered by him were also given the authority to regulate the administration, jurisdiction, policing, etc. of the colonies. Thus, in the German colonies there was, at a fundamental level, a dual legal structure, with different laws for the Europeans and the indigenous people. No colonial criminal law code was codified during German colonial rule.

==== Administration of individual colonies ====
At the top of the administration of each colony was the governor, who was aided by a chancellor (as deputy and assistance in legal matters), secretaries, and other officials.

The districts (Bezirke), the largest administrative subdivisions of a colony, were administered by a District Officer (Bezirksamtmann). In turn, a district was divided into district branches (Bezirksnebenstellen). Another form of administration in the colonies was the Resident (Residentur). These were comparable to the districts in size, but the native rulers were allowed far more power in residencies than in districts, helping to keep the costs of German administration as low as possible.

Schutztruppen were stationed in the colonies of Cameroon, Southwest Africa, and East Africa for internal military security. The police forces in the colonies were police troops (Polizeitruppen), organized on military lines. In the Kiautschou Leased Bay Territory, which was under the control of the German Imperial Naval Office, marines of the 3rd Sea Battalion were stationed as police.

In the colonies, there were Protectorate Courts (Schutzgebietsgerichte), modeled on consular courts. Jurisdiction over indigenous peoples, especially in criminal cases, was invested in the colonial officials in the colonies. In noncriminal matters, indigenous authorities were granted jurisdiction over their communities and could render judgment in accordance with local law.

For Germans and other Europeans, the district court (Bezirksgericht) had jurisdiction in first instance and there was a right of appeal to an upper court (Obergericht). In Togo, the size of the European population made an upper court impractical, so the upper court of Kamerun also acted as the appellate court for Togo.

=== German colonial population ===
The German colonial population numbered 5,125 in 1903, and about 23,500 in 1913. The German pre–World War I colonial population consisted of 19,696 Germans in Africa and the Pacific colonies in 1913, including more than 3,000 police and soldiers, and 3,806 in Kiaochow (1910), of which 2,275 were navy and military staff. In Africa (1913), 12,292 Germans lived in Southwest Africa, 4,107 in German East Africa and 1,643 in Cameroon. In the Pacific colonies in 1913 there were 1,645 Germans. After 1905 a ban on marriage was enacted forbidding mixed couples between German and native population in South West Africa, and after 1912 in Samoa.

After World War I, the military and "undesired persons" were expelled from the German protectorates. In 1934 the former colonies were inhabited by 16,774 Germans, of whom about 12,000 lived in the former Southwest African colony. Once the new owners of the colonies again permitted immigration from Germany, the numbers rose in the following years above the pre–World War I total.

=== Relationship between German and Indigenous populations ===
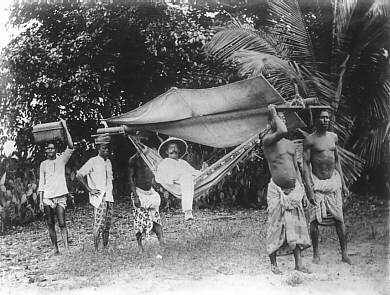
German colonial leader in Togo, c. 1885

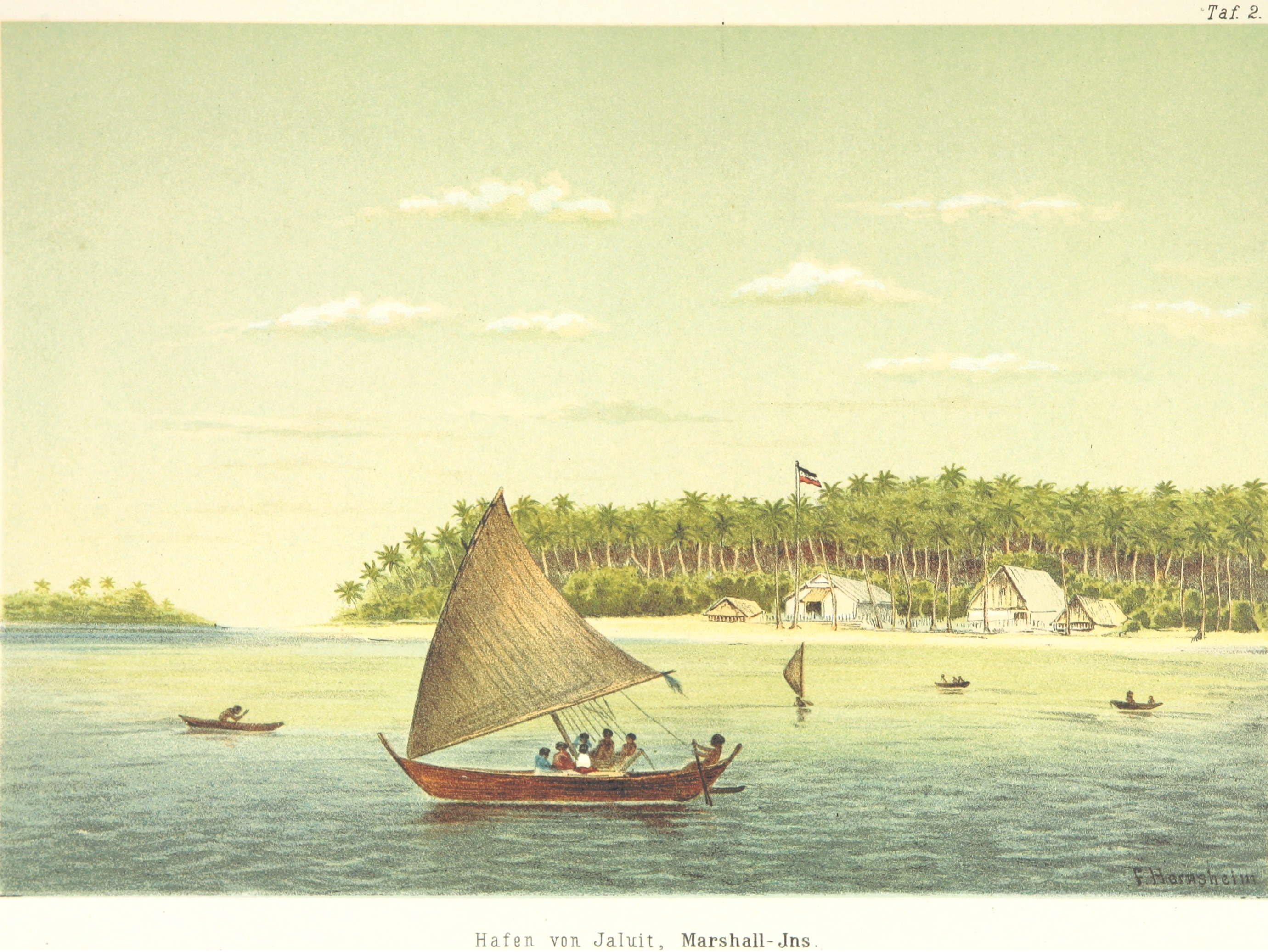
German trading station at Jaluit Atoll with a Marshallese korkor outrigger canoe in the foreground

==== Legal inequality ====
The relationship between the Germans and the indigenous populations in the German colonies was characterized by legal and social inequalities. There were two separate legal systems and people were assigned to one or the other on the basis of racial criteria. The "whites" (i.e. the German and European inhabitants of the colonies) formed a small, highly privileged minority – rarely reaching even 1% of a colony's total population. They enjoyed all the rights, privileges, and duties of normal German law. Non-German Europeans were legally their equals.

The 13 million or so "natives" of the German colonial empire did not become German citizens in 1913, when German citizenship was first introduced. They were not considered Imperial citizens, but only subjects or wards of Germany. German laws applied to them only if explicitly stated by the individual statute. In particular, they were shut out of the court system. They had no right of appeal against decisions of the colonial authorities or first-instance judgments. For the 10,000 or so people of Arab and Indian descent who lived in German East Africa, the governors had the ability to issue special regulations. According to the Protectorate Law, however, it was possible for "natives" to be granted Imperial citizenship and to pass that citizenship on to their children. The cause of this was the fact that the children of mixed marriages automatically received German citizenship. This was perceived as a threat to the "German body politic" and its "racial purity." As sexual relationships between the population groups had grown increasingly common, the colonies gradually banned "civil marriage between whites and natives" from 1905. Extra-marital sexual relationships were socially unacceptable, as leading to "Kaffirization" (Verkaffirung). In 1912, the Reichstag held a debate about the possibility of interracial relationships, resulting in most parties agreeing that such relationships should be legalized. However, no law on this was ever enacted. The ban remained in effect until the end of the German Empire.

==== Evangelism, education, and healthcare ====
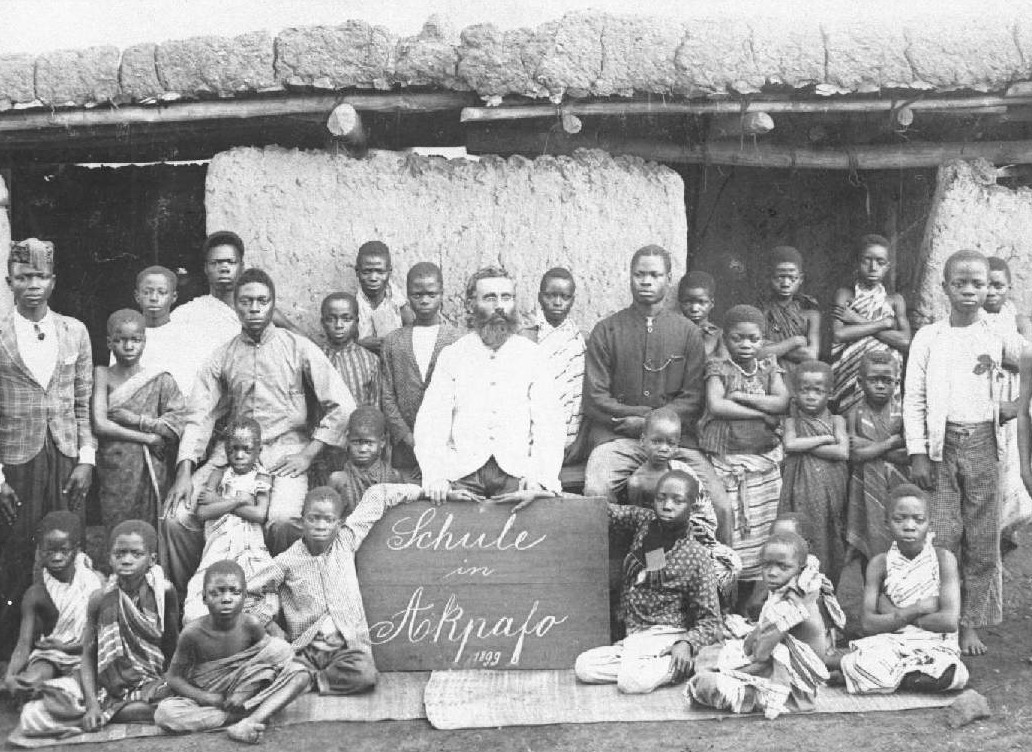
School of the North German Missionary Society in Togo, 1899

The German colonizers conceived of the indigenous populations as "children": people at a lower level of development, who had to be protected, educated, and raised up. German missionary societies were already concerning themselves with the education and conversion of overseas populations in the 1820s. Protestant organizations included the Berlin Missionary Society, Rhenish Missionary Society, Leipzig Missionary Society, and the North German Missionary Society. After the Kulturkampf had subsided, Catholic missionary societies were allowed to operate in the colonies too.

These missionary societies established stations in the colonies, where they instructed the indigenous people in basic education, modern agricultural techniques, and Christianity. They had substantial success, since the breakdown of precolonial society, which the German land seizures and colonial wars had engendered, often brought a spiritual crisis with it and the indigenous people sought comfort and support from the god of the new rulers, who appeared to have proven his superiority. Since the goal of the missionaries was the conversion of the indigenous peoples and they emphasized the virtue of neighborly love, they often had cause to protest against their abuse and exploitation by the colonial administration and plantation owners. In order to support themselves and to model good behavior, the missionaries themselves often had plantations, which were dependent on the indigenous people's skill and willingness to work. These goals often came into conflict. The missionaries were generally rather tolerant regarding traditional customs and practices. For example, they often allowed polygamy, which was widespread in Africa and the Pacific. The exception to this was the Islamic culture of the East African coast, which the missionaries strongly opposed.

=== Medicine and science ===
In her African and South Seas colonies, Germany established diverse biological and agricultural stations. Staff specialists and the occasional visiting university group conducted soil analyses, developed plant hybrids, experimented with fertilizers, studied vegetable pests and ran courses in agronomy for settlers and natives and performed a host of other tasks. Successful German plantation operators realized the benefits of systematic scientific inquiry and instituted and maintained their own stations with their own personnel, who further engaged in exploration and documentation of the native fauna and flora.

Research by bacteriologists Robert Koch and Paul Ehrlich and other scientists was funded by the imperial treasury and was freely shared with other nations. More than three million Africans were vaccinated against smallpox. Medical doctors the world over benefited from pioneering work into tropical diseases and German pharmaceutical discoveries "became a standard therapy for sleeping sickness and relapsing fever. The German presence (in Africa) was vital for significant achievements in medicine and agriculture."

By the late 1880s, German physicians identified venereal disease as a public health threat to Germany and its colonies. To fight it in Germany doctors used biopolitics to educate and regulate the bodies of likely victims. Propaganda campaigns did not work well in the colonies, so they imposed a much greater degree of supervision and coercion over targeted groups such as prostitutes.

During the Herero genocide, Eugen Fischer, a German scientist, came to the concentration camps to conduct medical experiments on race, using children of Herero people and multiracial children of Herero women and German men as test subjects. Together with Theodor Mollison he also experimented upon Herero prisoners. Those experiments included sterilization, injection of smallpox, typhus as well as tuberculosis. The numerous cases of mixed offspring upset the German colonial administration, which was concerned with maintaining "racial purity". Eugen Fischer studied 310 multiracial children, calling them "Rehoboth bastards" of "lesser racial quality". Fischer also subjected them to numerous racial tests such as head and body measurements, and eye and hair examinations. In conclusion of his studies he advocated genocide of alleged "inferior races", stating that "whoever thinks thoroughly the notion of race, can not arrive at a different conclusion". Fischer's actions (at the time considered) scientific and his torment of the children were part of a wider history of abusing Africans for experiments, and echoed earlier actions by German anthropologists who stole skeletons and bodies from African graveyards and took them to Europe for research or sale. An estimated 3000 skulls were sent to Germany for study. In October 2011, after three years of talks, the first skulls were due to be returned to Namibia for burial. Other experiments were made by Doctor Bofinger, who injected Herero who were suffering from scurvy with various substances including arsenic and opium. Afterward, he researched the effects of these substances by performing autopsies on dead bodies.

=== Social Darwinism ===
Social Darwinism is the theory "that human groups and races are subject to the same laws of natural selection as Charles Darwin had perceived in plants and animals in nature." According to numerous historians, an important ideological component of German nationalism as developed by the intellectual elite was Social Darwinism. It gave an impetus to German assertiveness as a world economic and military power, aimed at competing with France and the British Empire for world power. German colonial rule in Africa 1884–1914 was an expression of nationalism and moral superiority that was justified by constructing an image of the natives as "Other". German colonization was characterized by the use of repressive violence in the name of 'culture' and 'civilization'. Techniques included genocide in parts of Africa. Furthermore, the wide acceptance among intellectuals of social Darwinism justified Germany's right to acquire colonial territories as a matter of the 'survival of the fittest', according to historian Michael Schubert.

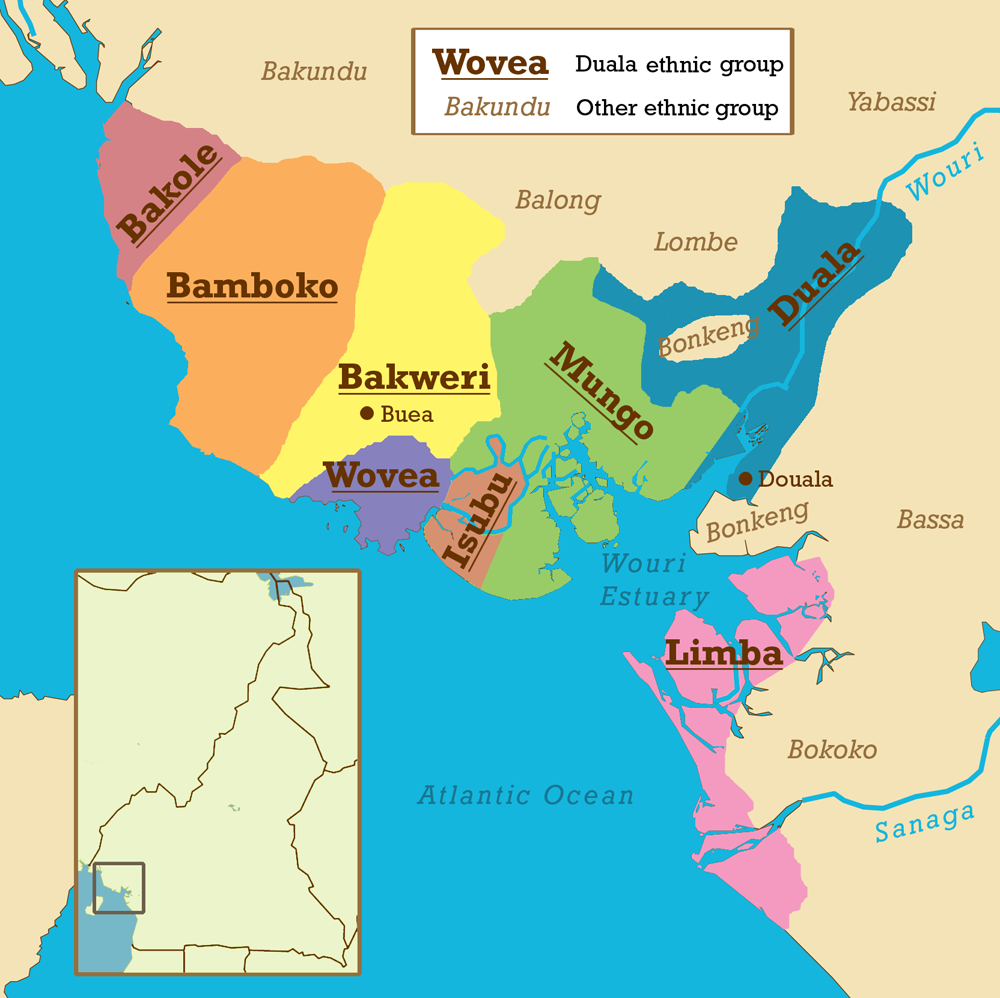
Map showing the location of the various Duala ethnic groups of Cameroon

On the other hand, Germany's cultural-missionary project boasted that its colonial programs were humanitarian and educational endeavors. Colonial German physicians and administrators tried to make a case for increasing the native population, in order to also increase their numbers of laborers. Eugene Fischer, an anthropologist at the University of Freiburg, agreed with that notion saying that they should only be supported as necessary and as they prove to be useful. Once their use is gone, Europeans should "allow free competition, which in my (Fischer's) opinion means their demise."

The Duala people, a Bantu group in Cameroon, readily welcomed German policies. The number of German-speaking Africans increased in four West African German colonies prior to 1914. The Duala leadership in 1884 placed the tribe under German rule. Most converted to Protestantism and were educated along German lines. Colonial officials and businessmen preferred them as inexpensive clerks to German government offices and firms in Africa.

== Legacy ==
=== Continuity thesis ===
In recent years scholars have debated the "continuity thesis" that links German colonialist brutalities to the treatment of Jews, Roma, Poles, and Russians during World War II. Some historians argue that Germany's role in southwestern Africa gave rise to an emphasis on racial superiority at home, which in turn was used by the Nazis. They argue that the limited successes of German colonialism overseas led to a decision to shift the main focus of German expansionism into Central and Eastern Europe, with the Mitteleuropa plan. German colonialism, therefore, turned to the European continent.

While a minority view during the Kaiserzeit, the idea developed in full swing under Erich Ludendorff and his political activity in the Baltic states, Ukraine, and Poland. Subsequently, after the defeat of Russia during World War I, Germany acquired vast territories with the Treaty of Brest-Litovsk and created several administrative regions like Ober Ost. Here also the German settlement would be implemented, and the whole governmental organization was developed to serve German needs while controlling the local ethnically diverse population. While the African colonies were too isolated and not suitable for mass settlement of Germans, areas in Central and Eastern Europe offered better potential for German settlement. Other scholars are skeptical and challenge the continuity thesis. Additionally, however, only one former colonial officer gained an important position in the Nazi administrative hierarchy.

=== Federal Republic ===
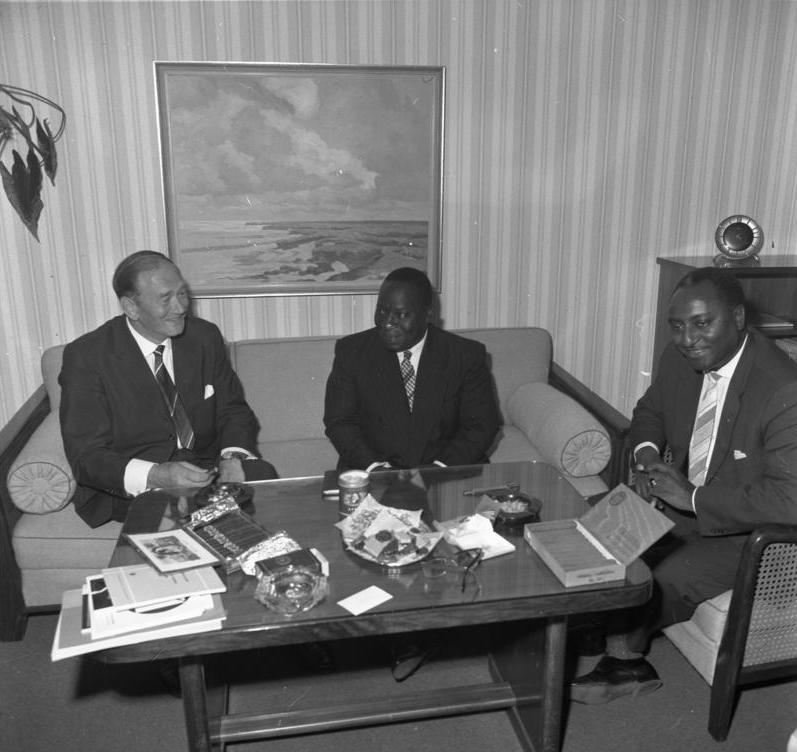
West German vice minister of workfare, Wilhelm Claussen (left), with Paul Armegee, transport minister of Togo, in Bonn, 1961

Regaining the former German colonies played no significant role in the politics of Post-war Germany. However, individual West German politicians proposed undertaking late or postcolonial enterprises, especially the management of trusts in Tanganyika or Togo. Even within the African freedom movement, these suggestions co-existed with calls for decolonization. At the end of 1952, members of the Ewe people submitted in a memorandum to the United Nations Trusteeship Council proposing that British and French Togoland be reunited and led towards independence together as a German trust territory. While this initiative was not accepted, in 1960, Adolf Friedrich zu Mecklenburg, the last Imperial German governor of Togo, was invited to Togo's independence celebrations by Sylvanus Olympio, President of Togo. Also, in 1954, Reinhold Bender unsuccessfully asked the United Nations to create a West German trusteeship over one of Germany's former colonies.

Efforts to revive the Colonial War League after the Second World War led to the establishment in Hamburg in 1955 of a "Union of Former Colonial Troops," ancestor of the current Traditional league of former colonial and overseas troops.

The final remains of the Protectorate Law survived until the legal expiration of the Colonial Society in 1975 and fiscal adjustments in 1992. Colonial history continues to be commemorated by colonial monuments, street names, and buildings related to German colonial history. In many places this has led to discussions about cultural memory and to calls for modification or renaming.

Representatives of the Herero and Nama, whose ancestors were killed in their thousands in German-administered Southwest Africa between 1904 and 1908, have taken legal action against Germany in the American courts. In January 2017, a class action against the German government was submitted to a court in New York. The statement of claim speaks of over 100,000 fatalities. In March 2017, it became known that the Namibian government was considering an action against Germany in the International Court of Justice in The Hague. It was said that damages were sought in the region of 30 billion dollars.

The publication of edited volumes on the themes of colonialism (2012) and German Colonial History (2019) by the Federal Agency for Civic Education aimed to bring about "revived awareness of colonialism in political, legal, and psychological spheres" to a wider group of readers and scholars, as the editor Asiye Öztürk put it. In 2015, Heinrich Heine University in Düsseldorf and the University of Dschang in Cameroon established a joint-research project on "Colonial links", which culminated in an exhibition in Düsseldorf in 2017. After that, the exhibition traveled to Dschang and to various German cities, where it was augmented with aspects of local relevance. Finally, a volume on the exhibition was published in 2019.

=== Impact ===
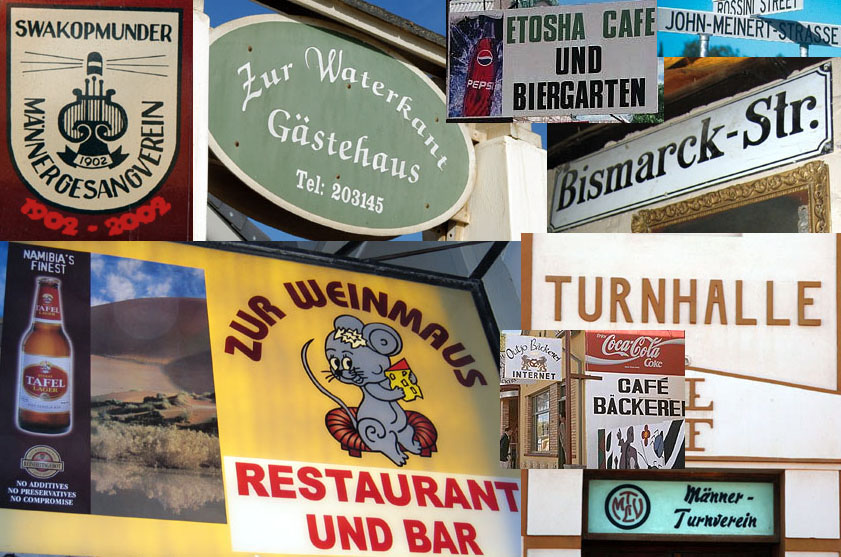
Examples of German language on signs in Namibia

Unlike other colonial empires such as the British, French, Portuguese, or Spanish, the Germans left very few traces of their own language, institutions or customs in its former colonies.

Currently, no country outside Europe uses German as an official language, although in Namibia, it is a recognized national language and there are numerous German placenames and architectural structures in the country. A 30,000 German ethnic minority resides in the country. In a long-term legacy of the East German Stasi's covert backing of the SWAPO guerrillas during the 1967–1989 South African Border War, a significant German-speaking minority exists among the Black population, who were brought up as children in Cold War era East Germany before the Peaceful Revolution in 1989.

After the end of World War II, many of the activists for Tanganyika's independence were the sons of Schutztruppe Askaris, who had fought for the last Kaiser during the East African Campaign. According to his biographers Leonard Mosley and Robert Gaudi, these activists often travelled to West Germany, during the last decades before the Decolonisation of Africa, to seek the advice of their fathers' former commanding officer, Paul von Lettow-Vorbeck.

According to Der Spiegel journalists Heinz Höhne and Hermann Zolling, the premature end of the German colonial empire in 1918 placed West Germany's Cold War foreign intelligence service, the Bundesnachrichtendienst (BND) and its founding chief Reinhard Gehlen at a considerable advantage in dealing with the newly independent governments of post-colonial Africa, Asia, and the Middle East. This is why many Third World militaries and foreign intelligence services were largely trained by BND military advisors. This made it possible for the BND to easily receive highly detailed and accurate intelligence reports from these regions in which the Central Intelligence Agency and especially the former colonialists' intelligence services could not acquire without recruiting local spy rings. BND covert activities in the Third World also laid the groundwork for friendly relations that Gen. Gehlen attempted to use to steer local governments into taking an anti-Soviet and Pro-NATO stance during the ongoing Cold War and further assisted the West German economic miracle by both encouraging and favoring West German trade and corporate investment.

At the same time, however, when West Germany's Goethe Institute was founded to encourage German-language learning and cultural diplomacy worldwide, the first foreign branches were founded in 1961, in the last Kaiser's former African colonies of Cameroon and Togo. Tanzania opened a Goethe Institute branch immediately after achieving independence from the British Empire later in that same year.

In post-World War I Rwanda, German colonial rule was nostalgically glorified and positively contrasted with the region's subsequent rule by the Belgian colonial empire. Close relations with West Germany were restored immediately following Rwandan independence and German military advisors helped train the Rwandan armed forces. The Goethe-Institute opened in the capital city of Kigali in 2009 and has since expanded into a separate building.

The German language remains a popular subject of study for students in all three nations. Furthermore, a lasting legacy of Imperial German rule remains in the significant number of German language borrowings in the Tanzanian dialect of Kiswahili. Examples include as shule (school), hela (money) and nusu kaputi (literally: half broken = full anesthesia).

== List of German colonies (in 1912) ==
Territory	Capital	Established	Disestablished	Area	Total population	German population	Current countries
Kamerun; Kamerun	Jaunde	1884	1920	495,000 km^{2}	4,645,000	1,359	Cameroon; Nigeria; Chad; Gabon; Central African Republic; Republic of the Congo
Togoland; Togo	Bagida (1884–87); Sebe (1887–97); Lomé (1897–1916)	1884	1920	87,200 km^{2}	1,003,000	316	Ghana; Togo
German South West Africa; Deutsch-Südwestafrika	Windhuk (from 1891)	1884	1920	835,100 km^{2}	86,000	12,135	Namibia
German East Africa; Deutsch-Ostafrika	Bagamoyo (1885–1890); Dar es Salaam (1890–1916); Tabora (1916, temporary)	1891	1920	995,000 km^{2}	7,511,000	3,579	Burundi; Kenya; Mozambique; Rwanda; Tanzania
German New Guinea; Deutsch-Neu-Guinea; Including Imperial German Pacific Protectorates: North Solomon Islands; Marshall Islands; Caroline Islands; Northern Mariana Islands	Finschhafen (1884–1891); Madang (1891–1899); Herbertshöhe (1899–1910); Simpsonhafen (1910–1914)	1884	1920	242,776 km^{2}	601,000	665	Papua New Guinea; Solomon Islands; Palau; Federated States of Micronesia; Nauru; Northern Mariana Islands; Marshall Islands
German Samoa; Deutsch-Samoa	Apia	1899	1920	2,570 km^{2}	38,000	294	Samoa
Kiautschou Bay Leased Territory; Pachtgebiet Kiautschou	Tsingtau	1897	1920	515 km^{2}	200,000	400	China
Total (as of 1912)				2,658,161 km^{2}	11,979,000	18,748	22

== See also ==
=== Colonialism ===
- Brandenburger Gold Coast
- Cologne in the German colonial empire
- Duala people
- German colonial projects before 1871
- German colonization of the Americas
- German East Africa Company
- German New Guinea Company
- History of German foreign policy
- Imperial Colonial Office
- List of former German colonies
- Proposed German colonial flags
- Reichskolonialbund
- Wilhelminism

=== Post-colonialism ===
- Cameroon–Germany relations
- GDR Children of Namibia
- German Academic Exchange Service
- German language in Namibia
- Germany–Namibia relations
- Germany–Rwanda relations
- Germany–Tanzania relations
- Germany–Togo relations
- Goethe Institute
- Kandt House Museum
- Unserdeutsch

== Sources and references ==
- Achleitner, Arthur; Johannes Biernatzki (1902). Deutschland und seine Kolonieen; Wanderungen durch das Reich und seine überseeischen Besitzungen, unter Mitwirkung von Arthur Achleitner, Johannes Biernatzki [etc.]. Berlin, Germany: H. Hilger.
- Esherick, Joseph W. (18 August 1988). The Origins of the Boxer Uprising. University of California Press. ISBN 978-0-520-90896-3.
- Westermann, Großer Atlas zur Weltgeschichte (in German)
- WorldStatesmen.org

== Bibliography ==
- Austen, Ralph A.; Derrick, Jonathan (1999). Middlemen of the Cameroons Rivers: The Duala and their Hinterland, c. 1600–c.1960. Cambridge University Press.
- Berghahn, Volker Rolf. "German Colonialism and Imperialism from Bismarck to Hitler" German Studies Review 40#1 (2017) pp. 147–162 Online
- Berman, Nina; Mühlhahn, Klaus; Nganang, Patrice, eds. (2014). German Colonialism Revisited: African, Asian, and Oceanic Experiences. Social History, Popular Culture, and Politics in Germany. University of Michigan Press. ISBN 978-0-472-02970-9.
- Boahen, A. Adu, ed. (1985). Africa Under Colonial Domination, 1880–1935. Berkeley: U of California Press. ISBN 978-0-520-06702-8 (1990 Abridged edition).
- Boianovsky, Mauro. "Friedrich List and the economic fate of tropical countries." History of Political Economy 45.4 (2013): 647–691. online
- Carroll, E. Malcolm. Germany and the great powers, 1866–1914: A study in public opinion and foreign policy (1938) looks at newspapers.
- Chamberlain, Muriel E. The scramble for Africa (Routledge, 2014) looks at all the powers.
- Chickering, Roger. We men who feel most German: a cultural study of the Pan-German League, 1886–1914 (Routledge, 2019).
- Churchill, William. "Germany's Lost Pacific Empire" Geographical Review 10.2 (1920): 84–90. online
- Crankshaw, Edward (1981). Bismarck. New York: The Viking Press. ISBN 0-14-006344-7.
- Davidson, J. W. (1967). Samoa mo Samoa, the Emergence of the Independent State of Western Samoa. Melbourne: Oxford University Press.
- Eley, Geoff, and Bradley Naranch, eds. German Colonialism in a Global Age (Duke UP, 2014).
- Esser, Max. Cameroon's Tycoon: Max Esser's expedition and its consequences (Berghahn Books, 2001).
- Gann, L., and Peter Duignan. The Rulers of German Africa, 1884–1914 (1977) focuses on political and economic history
- Garfield, Brian (2007). The Meinertzhagen Mystery. Washington, DC: Potomac Books. ISBN 978-1-59797-041-9.
- Giordani, Paolo (1916). The German colonial empire, its beginning and ending. London: G. Bell.
- Henderson, W. O. "The German Colonial Empire, 1884–1918" History 20#78 (1935), pp. 151–158 Online, historiography
- Henderson, W. O. "Germany's Trade with Her Colonies, 1884–1914." Economic History Review, 9#1 1938, pp. 1–16. online
- Kennedy, Paul M. "German Colonial Expansion. Has the" Manipulated Social Imperialism" Been Ante-Dated?." Past & Present 54 (1972): 134–141. online
- Lahti, Janne. "German Colonialism and the Age of Global Empires." Journal of Colonialism and Colonial History 17.1 (2016). historiography; excerpt
- Lewthwaite, Gordon R. (1962). James W. Fox; Kenneth B. Cumberland (eds.). Life, Land and Agriculture to Mid-Century in Western Samoa. Christchurch, New Zealand: Whitcomb & Tombs Ltd.
- Louis, Wm. Roger (1967). Great Britain and Germany's Lost Colonies 1914–1919. Clarendon Press.
- Louis, Wm. Roger (1963). Ruanda-Urundi 1884–1919. Clarendon Press.
- Miller, Charles (1974). Battle for the Bundu. The First World War in East Africa. Macmillan. ISBN 0-02-584930-1.
- Olivier, David H. German Naval Strategy, 1856–1888: Forerunners to Tirpitz (Routledge, 2004).
- Perras, Arne. Carl Peters and German Imperialism 1856-1918: A Political Biography (Oxford UP, 2004).
- Perraudin, Michael, and Jürgen Zimmerer, eds. German Colonialism and National Identity (2010) focuses on cultural impact in Africa and Germany.
- Poddar, Prem, and Lars Jensen, eds., A historical companion to postcolonial literatures: Continental Europe and Its Empires (Edinburgh UP, 2008), "Germany and its colonies" pp 198–261. excerpt also entire text online
- Poiger, Uta G. "Imperialism and empire in twentieth-century Germany." History & Memory 17.1–2 (2005): 117–143 online.
- Preble, George Henry (1894). History of the Flag of the United States of America: With a Chronicle of the Symbols, Standards, Banners, and Flags of Ancient and Modern Nations. Boston: Houghton, Mifflin and Co. OCLC 681420896.
- Reimann-Dawe, Tracey. "The British Other on African soil: the rise of nationalism in colonial German travel writing on Africa," Patterns of Prejudice (2011) 45#5 pp 417–433, the perceived hostile force was Britain, not the natives
- Sanderson, George Neville. "The European partition of Africa: Coincidence or conjuncture?" Journal of Imperial and Commonwealth History 3.1 (1974): 1–54.
- Sandler, Willeke. Empire in the Heimat: Colonialism and Public Culture in the Third Reich (Oxford UP, 2018). excerpt
- Sarkin, Jeremy, and Carly Fowler. "Reparations for Historical Human Rights Violations: The International and Historical Dimensions of the Alien Torts Claims Act Genocide Case of the Herero of Namibia." Human Rights Review 9.3 (2008): 331–360. online
- Smith, Woodruff. "The Colonial Novel as Political Propaganda: Hans Grimm's 'Volk Ohne Raum'." German Studies Review 6.2 (1983): 215–235. online
- Smith, W. D. (1974). "The Ideology of German Colonialism, 1840–1906". Journal of Modern History. 46 (1974): 641–663. doi:10.1086/241266. S2CID 153844608.
- Steinmetz, George (2007). The Devil's Handwriting: Precoloniality and the German Colonial State in Qingdao, Samoa, and Southwest Africa. Chicago: University of Chicago Press. ISBN 978-0226772431.
- Stoecker, Helmut, ed. (1987). German Imperialism in Africa: From the Beginnings Until the Second World War. Translated by Bernd Zöllner. Atlantic Highlands, NJ: Humanities Press International. ISBN 978-0-391-03383-2.
- Strandmann, Hartmut Pogge von. "Domestic Origins of Germany's Colonial Expansion under Bismarck" Past & Present (1969) 42:140–159 online
- von Strandmann, H. Pogge. "The German Role in Africa and German Imperialism: A Review Article." African Affairs 69#277 (1970): 381–389. online
- Taylor, A.J.P. (1967). Bismarck, The Man and the Statesman. New York: Random House, Inc.
- Townsend, Mary Evelyn. The rise and fall of Germany's colonial empire, 1884–1918 (1930) online
- Townsend, Mary Evelyn. Origins of modern German colonialism, 1871–1885 (1921) online.
- Uzoigwe, Godfrey N. "Reflections on the Berlin West Africa Conference, 1884–1885." Journal of the Historical Society of Nigeria 12.3/4 (1984): 9–22. online
- Walther, Daniel J. "Sex, Race and Empire: White Male Sexuality and the" Other" in Germany's Colonies, 1894–1914." German Studies Review (2010): 45–71. online
- Wehler, Hans-Ulrich "Bismarck's Imperialism 1862–1890," Past & Present, (1970) 48: 119–55 online
- Wesseling, H.L. (1996). Divide and Rule: The Partition of Africa, 1880-1914. Translated by Arnold J. Pomerans. Westport, CT: Preager. ISBN 978-0-275-95137-5. ISBN 978-0-275-95138-2
- Wildenthal, Lora. German women for empire, 1884-1945 (Duke University Press, 2001).

=== In German ===
- Detzner, Hermann, (Oberleut.) Kamerun Boundary: Die nigerische Grenze von Kamerun zwischen Yola und dem Cross-fluss. M. Teuts. Schutzgeb. 26 (13): 317–338.
- Haupt, Werner (1984). Deutschlands Schutzgebiete in Übersee 1884–1918. [Germany's Overseas Protectorates 1884–1918]. Friedberg: Podzun-Pallas Verlag. ISBN 3-7909-0204-7.
- Nagl, Dominik (2007). Grenzfälle – Staatsangehörigkeit, Rassismus und nationale Identität unter deutscher Kolonialherrschaft. Frankfurt/Main: Peter Lang Verlag. ISBN 978-3-631-56458-5.
- Schultz-Naumann, Joachim (1985). Unter Kaisers Flagge, Deutschlands Schutzgebiete im Pazifik und in China einst und heute. [Under the Kaiser's flag, Germany's Protectorates in the Pacific and in China then and today]. Munich: Universitas Verlag.
- Schaper, Ulrike (2012). Koloniale Verhandlungen. Gerichtsbarkeit, Verwaltung und Herrschaft in Kamerun 1884–1916. Frankfurt am Main: Campus Verlag. ISBN 978-3-593-39639-2.
- Karl Waldeck: "Gut und Blut für unsern Kaiser", Windhoek 2010, ISBN 978-99945-71-55-0
- Historicus Africanus: "Der 1. Weltkrieg in Deutsch-Südwestafrika 1914/15", Band 1, 2. Auflage Windhoek 2012, ISBN 978-99916-872-1-6
- Historicus Africanus: "Der 1. Weltkrieg in Deutsch-Südwestafrika 1914/15", Band 2, "Naulila", Windhoek 2012, ISBN 978-99916-872-3-0
- Historicus Africanus: "Der 1. Weltkrieg in Deutsch-Südwestafrika 1914/15", Band 3, "Kämpfe im Süden", Windhoek 2014, ISBN 978-99916-872-8-5
- Historicus Africanus: "Der 1. Weltkrieg in Deutsch-Südwestafrika 1914/15", Band 4, "Der Süden ist verloren", Windhoek 2015, ISBN 978-99916-909-2-6
- Historicus Africanus: "Der 1. Weltkrieg in Deutsch-Südwestafrika 1914/15", Band 5, "Aufgabe der Küste", Windhoek 2016, ISBN 978-99916-909-4-0
- Historicus Africanus: "Der 1. Weltkrieg in Deutsch-Südwestafrika 1914/15", Band 6, "Aufgabe der Zentralregionen", Windhoek 2017, ISBN 978-99916-909-5-7
- Historicus Africanus: "Der 1. Weltkrieg in Deutsch-Südwestafrika 1914/15", Band 7, "Der Ring schließt sich", Windhoek 2018, ISBN 978-99916-909-7-1
- Historicus Africanus: "Der 1. Weltkrieg in Deutsch-Südwestafrika 1914/15", Band 8, "Das Ende bei Khorab", Windhoek 2018, ISBN 978-99916-909-9-5

=== In French ===
- Gemeaux (de), Christine,(dir., présentation et conclusion): "Empires et colonies. L'Allemagne du Saint-Empire au deuil post-colonial", Clermont-Ferrand, PUBP, coll. Politiques et Identités, 2010, ISBN 978-2-84516-436-9.
