= Albert Shaw Lectures on Diplomatic History =

The Albert Shaw Lectures on Diplomatic History are annual lectures delivered at Johns Hopkins University in Baltimore, Maryland. The lectures were named after the benefactor, Albert Shaw of New York City, who had received his PhD from Johns Hopkins University in history and who was editor of The American Review of Reviews.

== Lecturers ==
Shaw lecturers over the years have included the following:

- 1899: John H. Latané
- 1900: James Morton Callahan
- 1906: Jesse Siddall Reeves
- 1907: Elbert Jay Benton
- 1909: Ephraim Douglass Adams
- 1911: Charles O. Paullin
- 1912: Isaac Joslin Cox
- 1913: William R. Manning
- 1914: Frank A. Updyke
- 1916: Payson Jackson Treat
- 1921: Percy Alvin Martin
- 1924: Henry Merritt Wriston
- 1926: Samuel Flagg Bemis
- 1927: Bruce Williams
- 1928: J. Fred Rippy
- 1929: Joseph Byrne Lockey
- 1930: Víctor Andrés Belaúnde
- 1931: Charles C. Tansill
- 1932:
- 1933: Charles Seymour
- 1934:
- 1935: Frank A. Simonds
- 1936: Julius W. Pratt
- 1937: Dexter Perkins
- 1938:
- 1939: Albert K. Weinberg
- 1940:
- 1941: Thomas A. Bailey
- 1942: Wilfred H. Callcott
- 1943:
- 1944:
- 1945:
- 1946: Malbone Watson Graham
- 1947:
- 1948:
- 1949:
- 1950:
- 1951:
- 1952:
- 1953: Howard K. Beale
- 1954: Max Beloff
- 1955:
- 1956: Arthur S. Link
- 1957:
- 1958: Gordon A. Craig
- 1959:
- 1960:
- 1961: Herbert George Nicholas
- 1968: Robert A. Divine
- 1979: Bradford Perkins
- 1980:
- 1981:
- 1982:
- 1983:
- 1984:
- 1985:
- 1986:
- 1987:
- 1988: Akira Iriye
- 1998: Charles E. Neu, Brian Balogh, George C. Herring, Robert K. Brigham, and Robert S. McNamara
