= Bibliography of Franklin D. Roosevelt =

This bibliography of Franklin D. Roosevelt is a selective list of scholarly works about Franklin D. Roosevelt, the president of the United States from 1933 to 1945.

== General ==
- Beasley, Maurine, ed. (2001), The Eleanor Roosevelt Encyclopedia, et al, Greenwood Publishing, ISBN 0-313-30181-6.
- Graham, Otis L. and Meghan Robinson Wander, eds. Franklin D. Roosevelt: His Life and Times. (1985). An encyclopedic reference. online
- Hiltzik, Michael. The New Deal: A Modern History (2011), popular history emphasizing personalities; online
- Kennedy, David M (1999), Freedom From Fear: The American People in Depression and War, 1929–1945 (wide-ranging survey of national affairs by leading scholar; Pulitzer Prize), ISBN 978-0-19-503834-7.
- Pederson, William D., ed. (2011). A Companion to Franklin D. Roosevelt. John Wiley & Sons. ISBN 978-1-4443-9517-4.; 35 essays by scholars.
- Rauchway, Eric (2008), The Great Depression and The New Deal; A Very Short Introduction, Oxford University Press, USA, ISBN 978-0-19-532634-5, balanced summary
- Schlesinger, Arthur M. Jr (1957–60), The Age of Roosevelt, vol. 3 volumes, OCLC 466716, the classic narrative history from 1928 to 1935. Strongly supports FDR.
- Winkler, Allan M. (2006). Franklin D. Roosevelt and the Making of Modern America. Longman. ISBN 0-321-41285-0.

== Biographical ==
- Beito, David T. (2025). FDR: A New Political Life (First ed.). Chicago: Carus Books. ISBN 978-1637700693.
- Black, Conrad (2005) [2003], Franklin Delano Roosevelt: Champion of Freedom (interpretive detailed biography), PublicAffairs, ISBN 978-1-58648-282-4.
- Brands, H. W. (2009). Traitor to His Class: The Privileged Life and Radical Presidency of Franklin Delano Roosevelt. Anchor Books. ISBN 978-0-307-27794-7.: despite the title, a highly favorable biography by scholar. Plus Author Webcast Interview at the Pritzker Military Library on January 22, 2009
- Burns, James MacGregor (1956). Roosevelt: The Lion and the Fox, 1882–1940. Vol. 1. Easton Press. ISBN 978-0-15-678870-0.
- ——— (1970). Roosevelt: the Soldier of Freedom, 1940–1945. Vol. 2. Harcourt Brace Jovanovich. ISBN 978-0-15-678870-0..
- Cook, Blanche Wiesen (1992). Eleanor Roosevelt. Vol. 1. Penguin. ISBN 0-14-009460-1.
- Dallek, Robert (2017). Franklin D. Roosevelt: A Political Life. Viking. ISBN 978-0-698-18172-4.
- Daniels, Roger (2015), Franklin D. Roosevelt: Road to the New Deal, 1882-1939, University of Illinois Press, ISBN 978-0-252-03951-5.
- Daniels, Roger (2016). Franklin D. Roosevelt: The War Years, 1939-1945. University of Illinois Press. ISBN 978-0-252-03952-2.
- Davis, Kenneth S (1972), FDR: The Beckoning of Destiny, 1882–1928 (popular biography), Putnam, ISBN 978-0-399-10998-0.
  - Davis, Kenneth S (1985), FDR: the New York Years, 1928–1933, ISBN 978-0-394-51671-4.
  - Davis, Kenneth S (1986), FDR: the New Deal Years, 1933–1937, ISBN 978-0-394-52753-6.
  - Davis, Kenneth S (1993), FDR: Into the Storm, 1937–1940, ISBN 978-0-679-41541-1.
  - Davis, Kenneth S (2000), FDR: the War President, 1940–1943, Random House, ISBN 978-0-679-41542-8.
- Freidel, Frank (1952–73), Franklin D. Roosevelt, vol. 4 volumes, OCLC 459748221: the most detailed scholarly biography; ends in 1933.
  - Frank Freidel, Franklin D. Roosevelt: The Apprenticeship (vol 1 1952) to 1918; online
  - Frank Freidel, Franklin D. Roosevelt: The Ordeal (1954), covers 1919 to 1928 online
  - Frank Freidel, Franklin D. Roosevelt: The Triumph (1956) covers 1929-32 online
  - Frank Freidel, Franklin D. Roosevelt: Launching the New Deal (1973), covers 1932–33
- ——— (1990), Franklin D. Roosevelt: A Rendezvous with Destiny (scholarly biography), Little, Brown, ISBN 978-0-316-29260-3; covers entire life in one volume.
- Goodwin, Doris Kearns (1995), No Ordinary Time: Franklin and Eleanor Roosevelt: The Home Front in World War II, Simon & Schuster, ISBN 978-0-684-80448-4; popular joint biography
- Jenkins, Roy (2003), Franklin Delano Roosevelt (short bio from British perspective), Macmillan, ISBN 978-0-8050-6959-4.
- Lash, Joseph P. (1971), Eleanor and Franklin: The Story of Their Relationship Based on Eleanor Roosevelt's Private Papers (history of a marriage), Norton, ISBN 978-0-393-07459-8.
- Morgan, Ted (1985), FDR: A biography (popular biography), Simon and Schuster, ISBN 978-0-671-45495-1.
- Purser, Chris (2025) FDR, KDP, ASIN B0F5XYMHQ6
- Roosevelt, Mrs. James; Leighton, Isabel; Forbush, Gabrielle (1933). My Boy Franklin (First ed.). R. Long & R.R. Smith.
- Rowley, Hazel (2010). Franklin and Eleanor: An Extraordinary Marriage. Farrar, Straus & Giroux. ISBN 978-0-374-15857-6.
- Smith, Jean Edward (2007). FDR. New York: Random House. ISBN 978-1-4000-6121-1., scholarly biography
- Ward, Geoffrey C (1985), Before The Trumpet: Young Franklin Roosevelt, 1882–1905, Harper & Row, ISBN 978-0-06-015451-6
- ——— (1992), A First-Class Temperament: The Emergence of Franklin Roosevelt (popular biography), Harper & Row, ISBN 978-0-06-016066-1: covers 1905–28.
- Ward, Geoffrey C.; Burns, Ken (2014). The Roosevelts: An Intimate History. Knopf Doubleday Publishing Group. ISBN 978-0-385-35306-9.

== Scholarly topical studies ==
- Alter, Jonathan (2006), The Defining Moment: FDR's Hundred Days and the Triumph of Hope (popular history), Simon & Schuster, ISBN 978-0-7432-4600-2.
- Badger, Anthony (2008), FDR: The First Hundred Days, Farrar, Straus and Giroux, ISBN 978-0-8090-4441-2 200 pp; overview by leading British scholar.
- Beito, David T. (2023). The New Deal's War on the Bill of Rights: The Untold Story of FDR's Concentration Camps, Censorship, and Mass Surveillance (First ed.). Oakland: Independent Institute. ISBN 978-1598133561.
- Bellush, Bernard (1955). Franklin D. Roosevelt as Governor of New York. LCCN 55006181.
- Brinkley, Douglas (2016). Rightful Heritage: Franklin D. Roosevelt and the Land of America. HarperCollins. ISBN 978-0-06-208923-6.; On his environmental and conservation beliefs & policies.
- Dunn, Susan. Roosevelt's Purge: How FDR Fought to Change the Democratic Party (2010), on 1938.
- Ferrell, Robert H. (1998). The Dying President: Franklin D. Roosevelt, 1944-1945. University of Missouri Press. ISBN 978-0-8262-1171-2. LCCN 97045797.
- Goldman, Armond S.; Goldman, Daniel A. (2017). Prisoners of Time: The Misdiagnosis of FDR's 1921 Illness. EHDP Press. ISBN 978-1-939-82403-5.
- Jeffries, John W. "A 'Third New Deal'? Liberal Policy and the American State, 1937-1945." Journal of Policy History 8.4 (1996): 387–409.
- Jordan, David M (2011), FDR, Dewey, and the Election of 1944, Bloomington: Indiana University Press, ISBN 978-0-253-35683-3.
- Katznelson, Ira (2013). Fear Itself: The New Deal and the Origins of Our Time. W.W. Norton. ISBN 978-0-8714-0738-2.
- Kennedy, David M (2009), "What the New Deal Did", Political Science Quarterly, 124 (2): 251–68, doi:10.1002/j.1538-165x.2009.tb00648.x.
- Leuchtenburg, William E. (1963). Franklin D. Roosevelt and the New Deal, 1932–1940. Harpers. ISBN 978-0-06-133025-4.
- ——— (2005), "Showdown on the Court", Smithsonian (fulltext), 36 (2), Ebsco: 106–13, ISSN 0037-7333.
- McJimsey, George (2000). The Presidency of Franklin Delano Roosevelt. University Press of Kansas. ISBN 978-0-7006-1012-9.
- McMahon, Kevin J (2004), Reconsidering Roosevelt on Race: How the Presidency Paved the Road to Brown, University of Chicago Press, ISBN 978-0-226-50088-1.
- Parmet, Herbert S; Hecht, Marie B (1968), Never Again: A President Runs for a Third Term, on 1940 election.
- Pietrusza, David (2015), 1932: The Rise of Hitler and FDR--Two Tales of Politics, Betrayal, and Unlikely Destiny. Study of Roosevelt's 1932 election.
- Pietrusza, David (2022), Roosevelt Sweeps Nation: FDR's 1936 Landslide and the Triumph of the Liberal Ideal. Study of Roosevelt's 1936 re-election landslide.
- Price, Charles M. and Joseph Boskin. "The Roosevelt 'Purge': A Reappraisal" Journal of Politics (1966) 28#3 660–670. doi:10.2307/2128161
- Ritchie, Donald A (2007), Electing FDR: The New Deal Campaign of 1932, University Press of Kansas, ISBN 978-0-7006-1687-9.
- Rosen, Elliot A (2005), Roosevelt, the Great Depression, and the Economics of Recovery, University of Virginia Press, ISBN 978-0-8139-2368-0.
- Savage, Sean J. Roosevelt, the Party Leader, 1932-1945 (1991).
- Shaw, Stephen K; Pederson, William D; Williams, Frank J, eds. (2004), Franklin D. Roosevelt and the Transformation of the Supreme Court, M.E. Sharpe, ISBN 978-0-7656-1033-1.
- Sitkoff, Harvard, ed. (1985), Fifty Years Later: The New Deal Evaluated (essays by scholars), Knopf, ISBN 978-0-394-33548-3.
- Yoo, John. "Franklin Roosevelt and Presidential Power." Chapman Law Review 21 (2018): 205+. [ on line], a view from the right

== Foreign policy and World War II ==
- Beitzell, Robert. The uneasy alliance; America, Britain, and Russia, 1941-1943 (1972) online
- Berthon, Simon; Potts, Joanna (2007). Warlords: An Extraordinary Re-creation of World War II through the Eyes and Minds of Hitler, Churchill, Roosevelt, and Stalin. Da Capo Press. ISBN 978-0-306-81650-5.
- Beschloss, Michael (2002). The Conquerors: Roosevelt, Truman, and the destruction of Hitler's Germany, 1941–1945. New York: Simon & Schuster. ISBN 978-0-684-81027-0.
- Burns, James MacGregor (1970). Roosevelt: The Soldier of Freedom. San Diego: Harcourt Brace Jovanovich. ISBN 978-0-15-178871-2.
- Churchill, Winston (1977). The Grand Alliance. Houghton Mifflin Harcourt. ISBN 0-395-41057-6.
- Cole, Wayne S (March 1957), "American Entry into World War II: A Historiographical Appraisal", The Mississippi Valley Historical Review, 43 (4): 595–617, doi:10.2307/1902275, JSTOR 1902275.
- Dallek, Robert (1995). Franklin D. Roosevelt and American Foreign Policy, 1932–1945. Oxford University. ISBN 0-19-509732-7.
- Feis, Herbert. Churchill, Roosevelt, Stalin; the war they waged and the peace they sought (1957) online
- Glantz, Mary E (2005), FDR and the Soviet Union: The President's Battles over Foreign Policy, U. Press of Kansas, ISBN 978-0-7006-1365-6, 253 pp.
- Hamilton, Nigel (2014), The Mantle of Command: FDR at War, 1941–1942, Houghton Mifflin Harcourt 514 pp.
- Heinrichs, Waldo (1988), Threshold of War. Franklin Delano Roosevelt and American Entry into World War II, Oxford University Press, ISBN 978-0-19-504424-9.
- Herman, Arthur (2012). Freedom's Forge: How American Business Produced Victory in World War II. Random House. ISBN 978-0-679-60463-1.
- Kaiser, David E. (2015). No End Save Victory: How FDR Led the Nation into War. Basic Books. ISBN 978-0465052981. excerpt and text search
- Kimball, Warren (1991), The Juggler: Franklin Roosevelt as World Statesman, Princeton University Press, ISBN 978-0-691-04787-4.
- Lacey, James. The Washington War: FDR's Inner Circle and the Politics of Power That Won World War II (2019)
- Langer, William; Gleason, S Everett (1952), The Challenge to Isolation, 1937–1940, OCLC 1448535. The Undeclared War, 1940–1941 (1953) OCLC 404227. highly detailed and influential two-volume semi-official history
- Larrabee, Eric (1987), Commander in Chief: Franklin Delano Roosevelt, His Lieutenants, and Their War, Harper & Row, ISBN 978-0-06-039050-1. Detailed history of how FDR handled the war.
- McNeill, William H. America, Britain, and Russia: Their Co-operation and Conflict, 1941-1946 (1953)
- Mayers, David. FDR's Ambassadors and the Diplomacy of Crisis: From the Rise of Hitler to the End of World War II (2013)
- Miscamble, Wilson D. (2007). From Roosevelt to Truman: Potsdam, Hiroshima, and the Cold War. Cambridge University Press. ISBN 978-0-521-86244-8.
- Reynolds, David (2006), From World War to Cold War: Churchill, Roosevelt, and the International History of the 1940s, OUP Oxford, ISBN 978-0-19-928411-5
- Sainsbury, Keith (1994). Churchill and Roosevelt at War: The War They Fought and the Peace They Hoped to Make. New York University Press. ISBN 0-8147-7991-3.
- Sherwood, Robert E (1949) [1950], Roosevelt and Hopkins: an Intimate History, Harper, hdl:2027/heb.00749, ISBN 978-0-06-013845-5, Pulitzer Prize.
- Viorst, Milton (1965). Hostile allies: FDR and Charles de Gaulle. Macmillan.
- Tierney, Dominic (2007). FDR and the Spanish Civil War, Neutrality and Commitment in the Struggle that Divided America. Duke University Press. ISBN 978-0-8223-4076-8.
- Weinberg, Gerhard L (1994), A World at Arms: A Global History of World War II, ISBN 978-0-521-44317-3. Overall history of the war; strong on diplomacy of FDR and other main leaders.
- Woods, Randall Bennett (1990), A Changing of the Guard: Anglo-American Relations, 1941–1946, UNC Press Books, ISBN 978-0-8078-1877-0.

== Criticism ==
- Barnes, Harry Elmer (1953), Perpetual War for Perpetual Peace: A Critical Examination of the Foreign Policy of Franklin Delano Roosevelt and Its Aftermath, OCLC 457149. A revisionist blames FDR for inciting Japan to attack.
- Best, Gary Dean (1991), Pride, Prejudice, and Politics: Roosevelt Versus Recovery, 1933–1938, Praeger, ISBN 0-275-93524-8; summarizes newspaper editorials.
- Best, Gary Dean (2002), The Retreat from Liberalism: Collectivists versus Progressives in the New Deal Years, Praeger, ISBN 0-275-94656-8 criticizes intellectuals who supported FDR.
- Breitman, Richard; Lichtman, Allan J (2013), FDR and the Jews, Harvard University Press, ISBN 978-0-674-05026-6, OCLC 812248674, 433 pp.
- Conkin, Paul K (1975), New Deal, New York: Crowell, ISBN 0-690-00810-4, critique from the left.
- Doenecke, Justus D; Stoler, Mark A (2005), Debating Franklin D. Roosevelt's Foreign Policies, 1933–1945, Lanham: Rowman & Littlefield, ISBN 0-8476-9415-1. 248 pp.
- Feingold, Henry L (1970), The Politics of Rescue: The Roosevelt Administration and the Holocaust, 1938–1945, Rutgers University Press, ISBN 0-8135-0664-6, OCLC 98997.
- Flynn, John T (1948), The Roosevelt Myth, former FDR supporter condemns all aspects of FDR.
- Moley, Raymond (1939), After Seven Years (insider memoir by Brain Truster who became conservative).
- Russett, Bruce M (1997), No Clear and Present Danger: A Skeptical View of the United States Entry into World War II (2nd ed.), says US should have let USSR and Germany destroy each other.
- Plaud, Joseph J (2005), Historical Perspectives on Franklin D. Roosevelt, American Foreign Policy, and the Holocaust, The FDR American Heritage Center Museum, archived from the original on January 12, 2014.
- Powell, Jim (2003), FDR's Folly: How Roosevelt and His New Deal Prolonged the Great Depression, Crown Forum, ISBN 0-7615-0165-7.
- Robinson, Greg (2001), By Order of the President: FDR and the Internment of Japanese Americans says FDR's racism was primarily to blame.
- Schivelbusch, Wolfgang (2006), Three New Deals: Reflections on Roosevelt's America, Mussolini's Italy, and Hitler's Germany, 1933–1939, compares populist and paternalist features.
- Schweikart, Larry; Allen, Michael (2004). A Patriot's History of the United States: From Columbus's Great Discovery to the War on Terror. Penguin Group US. ISBN 978-1-101-21778-8.
- Smiley, Gene (1993), Rethinking the Great Depression (short essay) by libertarian economist who blames both Hoover and FDR.
- Wyman, David S (1984), The Abandonment of the Jews: America and the Holocaust 1941–1945, Pantheon Books. Attacks Roosevelt for passive complicity in allowing Holocaust to happen.

== FDR's rhetoric ==
- Braden, Waldo W; Brandenburg, Earnest, eds. (1955), "Roosevelt's Fireside Chats", Communication Monographs, 22 (5): 290–302, doi:10.1080/03637755509375155.
- Buhite, Russell D; Levy, David W, eds. (1993), FDR's Fireside Chats.
- Craig, Douglas B (2005), Fireside Politics: Radio and Political Culture in the United States, 1920–1940.
- Crowell, Laura (1952), "Building the 'Four Freedoms' Speech", Communication Monographs, 22 (5): 266–83, doi:10.1080/03637755509375153.
- ——— (1950), "Franklin D. Roosevelt's Audience Persuasion in the 1936 Campaign", Communication Monographs, 17: 48–64, doi:10.1080/03637755009374997.
- Houck, Davis W (2002), FDR and Fear Itself: The First Inaugural Address, Texas A&M UP.
- ——— (2001), Rhetoric as Currency: Hoover, Roosevelt, and the Great Depression, Texas A&M UP.
- Roosevelt, Franklin D. (2005), My Friends, Kessinger Publishing, ISBN 1-4179-9610-2
- Ryan, Halford Ross (1979), "Roosevelt's First Inaugural: A Study of Technique", Quarterly Journal of Speech, 65 (2): 137–49, doi:10.1080/00335637909383466.
- ——— (1988), Franklin D. Roosevelt's Rhetorical Presidency, Greenwood Press.
- Stelzner, Hermann G (1966), "'War Message,' December 8, 1941: An Approach to Language", Communication Monographs, 33 (4): 419–37, doi:10.1080/03637756609375508, S2CID 144612750.

== Historiography ==
- Hendrickson Jr., Kenneth E. "FDR Biographies," in William D. Pederson, ed. A Companion to Franklin D. Roosevelt (2011) pp 1–14
- Provizer, Norman W. "Eleanor Roosevelt Biographies," in William D. Pederson, ed. A Companion to Franklin D. Roosevelt (2011) pp 15–33

== Primary sources ==
- Cantril, Hadley; Strunk, Mildred, eds. (1951), Public Opinion, 1935–1946, massive compilation of many public opinion polls from the US.
- Loewenheim, Francis L; Langley, Harold D, eds. (1975), Roosevelt and Churchill: Their Secret Wartime Correspondence.
- Roosevelt, Franklin Delano (1945) [1938], Rosenman, Samuel Irving (ed.), The Public Papers and Addresses of Franklin D. Roosevelt, vol. 13 volumes.
- ——— (1946), Zevin, BD (ed.), Nothing to Fear: The Selected Addresses of Franklin Delano Roosevelt, 1932–1945.
- ——— (2005) [1947], Taylor, Myron C (ed.), Wartime Correspondence Between President Roosevelt and Pope Pius XII (reprint), Kessinger Publishing, ISBN 978-1-4191-6654-9.
- Roosevelt, Franklin. Franklin D. Roosevelt and foreign affairs (FDR Library, 1969) 14 vol. online free to borrow; covers Jan 1933 to Aug 1939; 9 volumes are online
  - Nixon, Edgar B, ed. (1969), Franklin D Roosevelt and Foreign Affairs (3 vol), covers 1933–37. 2nd series 1937–39 available on microfiche and in a 14 vol print edition at some academic libraries.
- Tully, Grace (2005). Franklin Delano Roosevelt, My Boss. Kessinger Publishing. ISBN 978-1-4179-8926-3.

== See also ==
- New Deal#Sources & further reading
- United States home front during World War II#Further reading
- Bibliography of Eleanor Roosevelt
