= Robert K. Brigham =

American historian

- Born: April 20, 1960 (age 65); Buffalo, New York
- Occupation: Historian

Robert K. Brigham is the Shirley Ecker Boskey Professor of History and International Relations at Vassar College. He is a historian of US foreign policy, particularly of the Vietnam War.

== Education ==
Brigham earned his undergraduate degree from The College at Brockport, State University of New York and an MA from University of Rhode Island in 1982 prior to receiving his PhD from University of Kentucky in 1994. At Kentucky, Brigham worked with Professor George C. Herring.

== Career ==
Brigham joined Vassar in 1994. He has received numerous awards, including fellowships from the Rockefeller Foundation, Andrew W. Mellon Foundation, National Endowment for the Humanities, Smith Richardson Foundation, and the Social Sciences Committee in Hanoi. In addition, he has been Mellon Senior Visiting Scholar at Clare College, Cambridge, and visiting professor of international relations at the Watson Institute for International and Public Affairs at Brown University.

In 1998, he was an Albert Shaw Endowed Lecturer at Johns Hopkins University alongside Charles E. Neu, Brian Balogh, Robert McNamara, and George C. Herring. From 2007 to 2008, he held the Mary Ball Washington Professorship of American History (Fulbright) at University College Dublin.

In addition to his academic writing, Brigham has published hundreds of reviews and op-ed pieces in newspapers, such as the Washington Post, Wall Street Journal, and the Independent. He has also appeared on NPR, the News Hour with Jim Lehrer, the BBC, CBS Radio, and CNN. In 2017, Brigham contributed op-ed pieces to The New York Times series, Vietnam '67.

== Awards ==
- Outstanding Faculty Member, Southern Vermont College (1987)
- Chancellor's Award for Outstanding Teaching, University of Kentucky (1993)
- Outstanding Faculty Member, Semester at Sea, University of Virginia (2014)
- Outstanding Faculty Award, Alumnae/I Association of Vassar College (2019)
- Peter L. Hahn Distinguished Service Award, Society for Historians of American Foreign Relations (2023)

== Books ==
- This Is a True War Story: My Improbable History with Vietnam (University of Chicago Press, 2026) ISBN 978-0-22684-688-0.
- Reckless: Henry Kissinger and the Tragedy of Vietnam (PublicAffairs, 2018) ISBN 978-1-61039-702-5.
- American Foreign Relations: A History, Volumes I & II, Eighth edition (Cengage, 2015) ISBN 978-1-285-73627-3. Co-authored with Thomas G. Paterson, J. Garry Clifford, Michael E. Donoghue, Kenneth J. Hagan, Deborah Kisatsky, Shane J. Maddock.
- The United States and Iraq Since 1990: a Brief History with Documents (Wiley, 2013) ISBN 978-1-118-29455-0.
- Iraq, Vietnam, and the Limits of American Power (PublicAffairs, 2008) ISBN 978-0-7867-3173-2.
- Is Iraq Another Vietnam? (PublicAffairs, 2006) ISBN 978-1-58648-413-2.
- ARVN: life and death in the South Vietnamese Army (University Press of Kansas, 2006) ISBN 0-7006-1433-8.
- Guerrilla Diplomacy: The NLF's Foreign Relations and the Viet Nam War (Cornell University Press, 1999) ISBN 0-8014-3317-7.
- Argument without End: In Search of Answers to the Vietnam Tragedy (PublicAffairs, 1999) ISBN 1-891620-22-3. Co-authored with Robert McNamara, James Blight, Thomas J. Biersteker, and Colonel Herbert Schandler.
