= Albert Henry Imlah =

Albert Henry Imlah (January 30, 1901 – July 8, 1989) was an American historian who was Walter S. Dickson Professor of English and American History at Tufts University and adjunct professor of diplomatic history at The Fletcher School of Law and Diplomacy. He specialized in the economic history of nineteenth-century Britain and its overseas trade, and his study Economic Elements in the Pax Britannica (1958) provided widely used estimates of the British balance of payments for the period 1816–1913.

== Early life and education ==
Imlah was born on January 30, 1901 in New Westminster, British Columbia. He received his A.B. from the University of British Columbia in 1922 and a M.A. from Clark University in Massachusetts. He completed his Ph.D. at Harvard University in 1931; his doctoral thesis, a biography of the nineteenth-century British statesman Edward Law, 1st Earl of Ellenborough, was subsequently published by Harvard University Press in 1939 as part of the Harvard Historical Studies series.

== Academic career ==
After teaching history at the University of Maine, Imlah joined the faculty of Tufts College in 1927. Promoted to the rank of professor in 1935, he was appointed adjunct professor of diplomatic history at the Fletcher School of Law and Diplomacy in 1944, and served as chair of the Department of History at Tufts from 1956 to 1965. In 1958, he was named the Walter S. Dickson Professor of English and American History, a chair he held until his retirement in 1970. In 1981, Tufts conferred on him the honorary degree of Doctor of Letters in recognition of his teaching, scholarship, and service to the university.

From 1946 to 1949, Imlah served on the national council of the American Association of University Professors (AAUP), and from 1948 to 1958, Imlah chaired the AAUP's Committee on the Economic Status of the Profession.

== Personal life ==
In 1954, Imlah was widowed by the death of his first wife. He remarried and, at the time of his death, was survived by his second wife, two daughters, and four grandchildren.

== Recognition ==
Tufts University established two undergraduate history prizes named in Imlah's honour: the Albert H. Imlah European History Prize, awarded for distinguished work in the History of Western Civilization course or the Honors Program, and the Albert H. Imlah Excellence in History Prize, awarded to a senior selected by the Department of History for excellence in history.

== Selected publications ==
- Lord Ellenborough: A Biography of Edward Law, Earl of Ellenborough, Governor-General of India. Harvard Historical Studies, vol. 43. Cambridge, Mass.: Harvard University Press, 1939.
- "Real Values in British Foreign Trade, 1798–1853." The Journal of Economic History 8, no. 2 (1948): 133–152.
- "The Terms of Trade of the United Kingdom, 1798–1913." The Journal of Economic History 10, no. 2 (1950): 170–194.
- "British Balance of Payments and Export of Capital, 1816–1913." The Economic History Review 5, no. 2 (1952): 208–239.
- Economic Elements in the Pax Britannica: Studies in British Foreign Trade in the Nineteenth Century. Cambridge, Mass.: Harvard University Press, 1958.
