= Diplomatic history =

History of international relations between States

Diplomatic history deals with the history of international relations between states. Diplomatic history can be different from international relations in that the former can concern itself with the foreign policy of one state while the latter deals with relations between two or more states. Diplomatic history tends to be more concerned with the history of diplomacy, but international relations concern more with current events and creating a model intended to shed explanatory light on international politics.

== Historiography ==
=== Ranke ===
In the 5th century BCE the Greek historian Thucydides was highly concerned with the relations among states. However Leopold von Ranke (1795–1886), the leading German historian of the 19th century, codified the modern form of diplomatic history. Ranke wrote largely on the history of Early Modern Europe, using the diplomatic archives of the European powers (particularly the Republic of Venice) to construct a detailed understanding of the history of Europe wie es eigentlich gewesen ist ("as it actually happened"). Ranke saw diplomatic history as the most important kind of history to write because of his idea of the "Primacy of Foreign Affairs" (Primat der Aussenpolitik), arguing that the concerns of international relations drive the internal development of the state. Ranke's understanding of diplomatic history relied on using as sources the large number of official documents produced by modern western governments; he argued that historians should examine such sources in an objective and neutral spirit.

=== 20th century scholars ===
Ranke's understanding of the dominance of foreign policy, and hence an emphasis on diplomatic history, remained the dominant paradigm in historical writing through the first half of the twentieth century. In the early 20th centuries, work by prominent diplomatic historians such as Charles Webster, Harold Temperley, and Bernadotte Everly Schmitt focused on great European events, especially wars and peace conferences. A notable breakthrough in diplomatic historiography occurred in 1910 when the French government start to publish all of the archives relating to the war of 1870.

Ranke's approach, combined with the effects of the War Guilt Clause in the Treaty of Versailles (1919) that blamed Germany, stimulated a massive outpouring in many languages on the origins of the war of 1914. The Bolsheviks in Russia published key secret papers from the Allies in 1918 and other governments commissioned carefully edited, multivolume collections of key documents in their possession. Numerous historians wrote multi-volume histories of the origins of the war. In the interwar period, most diplomatic historians tended to blame all of the Great Powers of 1914 for the First World War, arguing that the war was in effect everybody's responsibility. In general, the early works in this vein fit fairly comfortably into Ranke's emphasis on Aussenpolitik.

Historian Muriel Chamberlain notes that after the First World War:

diplomatic history replaced constitutional history as the flagship of historical investigation, at once the most important, most exact and most sophisticated of historical studies.

She adds that after 1945, the trend reversed, allowing political, intellectual and social history to displace diplomatic history.

For the first half of the 20th century, most diplomatic history working within the narrow confines of the Primat der Aussenpolitik approach was very narrowly concerned with foreign-policy making elites with little reference to broader historical forces. The most notable exceptions to this tendency were A. J. P. Taylor and William Medlicott in Britain, Pierre Renouvin in France, and William L. Langer in the United States, who examined economic and domestic political forces.

=== Causes of World War Two ===
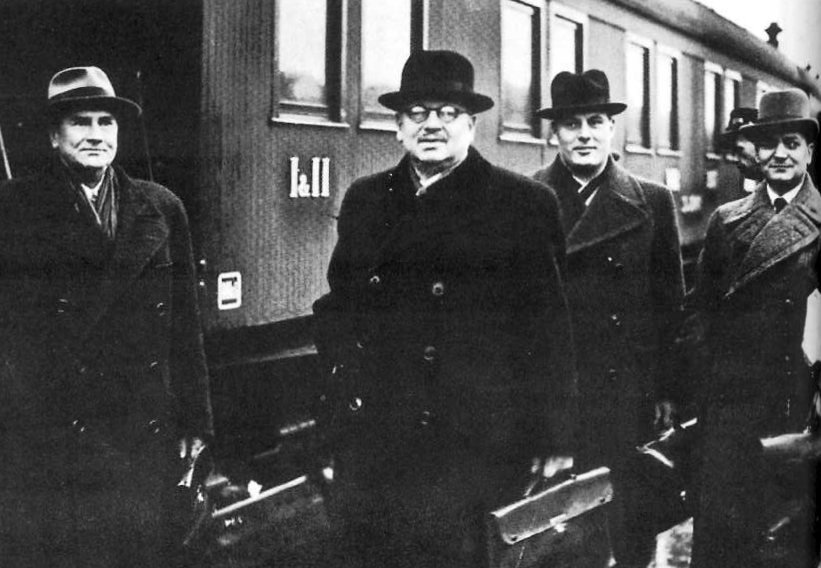
After the Second World War, J. K Paasikivi (in the middle), the 7th President of the Republic of Finland, was remembered as a main architect of Finland's foreign policy, especially with the Soviet Union, which was at that time the war enemy of Finland.

Sir Winston Churchill's multi-volume The Second World War, especially the first volume The Gathering Storm (1948) set the framework and the interpretation for much later historiography. His interpretation, echoing his own position before the war, that World War II was caused by the mad ambitions of Adolf Hitler; Churchill damned the cowardly and weak-willed British and French leaders who used appeasement in a futile effort to avoid the war. Churchill did not consider the argument that the alternative to appeasement was a premature war that Germany would win in 1938. The British historian A. J. P. Taylor's 1961 book The Origins of the Second World War challenged Churchill's viewpoint and argued that Hitler had no master-plan for conquering the world. Instead he was an ordinary statesman –-an opportunistic leader seizing whatever chances he had for expansionism. The fact that a world war started over Poland in 1939 was due to diplomatic miscalculation by all the countries concerned, instead of being a case of German aggression. British historians such as D.C. Watt, Paul Kennedy, George Peden and David Dilks argued that appeasement was not an aberration, and that it was an old British tradition which in this case flowed from numerous structural, economic and military factors. Historians such as Christopher Thorne and Harry Hinsley abandoned the previous focus on individual leaders to discuss the broader societal influences such as public opinion and narrower ones like intelligence on diplomatic relations. In recent years the debates regarding the 1930s have continued, but new approaches are in use, such as an analysis in terms of Britain's national identity.

=== French approaches ===
A group of French historians centered around Pierre Renouvin (1893–1974) and his protégés Jean-Baptiste Duroselle and Maurice Baumont started a new type of international history in the 1950s that included taking into account what Renouvin called forces profondes (profound forces) such as the influence of domestic politics on French foreign policy. However, Renouvin and his followers still followed the concept of la décadence with Renouvin arguing that French society under the Third Republic was “sorely lacking in initiative and dynamism” and Baumont arguing that French politicians had allowed "personal interests" to override "any sense of the general interest". In 1979, Duroselle's book La Décadence offered a total condemnation of the entire Third Republic as weak, cowardly and degenerate.

=== Fischer debate on World War One ===
At the same time, in 1961 when the German historian Fritz Fischer published Griff nach der Weltmacht, which established that Germany had caused the First World War led to the fierce "Fischer Controversy" that tore apart the West German historical profession. One result of Fischer's book was the rise in the Primat der Innenpolitik (Primacy of Domestic Politics) approach. As a result of the rise of the Primat der Innenpolitik school, diplomatic historians increasing started to pay attention to domestic politics. In the 1970s, the conservative German historian Andreas Hillgruber, together with his close associate Klaus Hildebrand, was involved in a very acrimonious debate with the leftish German historian Hans-Ulrich Wehler over the merits of the Primat der Aussenpolitik ("primacy of foreign politics") and Primat der Innenpolitik ("primacy of domestic politics") schools. Hillgruber and Hildebrand made a case for the traditional Primat der Aussenpolitik approach to diplomatic history with the stress on examining the records of the relevant foreign ministry and studies of the foreign policy decision-making elite. Wehler, who favored the Primat der Innenpolitik approach, for his part contended that diplomatic history should be treated as a sub-branch of social history, calling for theoretically based research, and argued that the real focus should be on the study of the society in question. Moreover, under the influence of the Primat der Innenpolitik approach, diplomatic historians in the 1960s, 70s and 80s start to borrow models from the social sciences.

=== Mason–Overy debate on internal pressures inside Nazi Germany ===
A notable example of the Primat der Innenpolitik approach was the claim by the British Marxist historian Timothy Mason who claimed that the launch of World War II in 1939 was best understood as a “barbaric variant of social imperialism”. Mason argued that “Nazi Germany was always bent at some time upon a major war of expansion”. However, Mason argued that the timing of such a war was determined by domestic political pressures, especially as relating to a failing economy, and had nothing to do with what Hitler wanted. In Mason's view in the period between 1936 and 1941, it was the state of the German economy, and not Hitler's "will" or "intentions" that was the most important determinate on German decision-making on foreign policy. Mason argued that the Nazi leaders were deeply haunted by the November Revolution of 1918, and was most unwilling to see any fall in working class living standards out of the fear that it might provoke another November Revolution. According to Mason, by 1939, the “overheating” of the German economy caused by rearmament, the failure of various rearmament plans produced by the shortages of skilled workers, industrial unrest caused by the breakdown of German social policies, and the sharp drop in living standards for the German working class forced Hitler into going to war at a time and place not of his choosing. Mason contended that when faced with the deep socio-economic crisis the Nazi leadership had decided to embark upon a ruthless “smash and grab” foreign policy of seizing territory in Eastern Europe which could be pitilessly plundered to support living standards in Germany. Mason's theory of a "Flight into war" being imposed on Hitler generated much controversy, and in the 1980s he conducted a series of debates with economic historian Richard Overy over this matter. Overy maintained the decision to attack Poland was not caused by structural economic problems, but rather was the result of Hitler wanting a localized war at that particular time in history. For Overy, a major problem with the Mason thesis was that it rested on the assumption that in a way unrecorded by the records, that information was passed on to Hitler about the Reich's economic problems. Overy argued that there was a major difference between economic pressures inducted by the problems of the Four Year Plan, and economic motives to seize raw materials, industry and foreign reserve of neighboring states as a way of accelerating the Four Year Plan. Moreover, Overy asserted that the repressive capacity of the German state as a way of dealing with domestic unhappiness was somewhat downplayed by Mason.

=== Japanese-American relations ===
In addition, because World War II was a global war, diplomatic historians start to focus on Japanese-American relations to understand why Japan had attacked the United States in 1941. This in turn led diplomatic historians to start to abandon the previous Euro-centric approach in favor of a more global approach. A sign of the changing times was the rise to prominence of such diplomatic historians such as the Japanese historian Chihiro Hosoya, the British historian Ian Nish, and the American historian Akira Iriye, which was the first time that Asian specialists became noted diplomatic historians.

=== Vietnam war and revisionism ===
The Cold War and decolonization greatly added the tendency to a more global diplomatic history. The Vietnam War led to the rise of a revisionist school in the United States, which led many American historians such as Gabriel Kolko and William Appleman Williams to reject traditional diplomatic history in favor of a Primat der Innenpolitik approach that saw a widespread examination of the influence of American domestic politics together with various social, economic and cultural forces on foreign-policy making. In general, the American Cold War revisionists tended to focus on American foreign policy decision-making with respect to the genesis of the Cold War in the 1940s and on how the United States became involved in Vietnam in the 1960s. Starting in the 1960s, a ferocious debate has taken place within Cold War historiography between the advocates of the “orthodox” school which saw the Cold War as a case of Soviet aggression such as Vojtech Mastny against the proponents of the “revisionist” school which saw the Cold War as a case of American aggression. Latterly, a third school known as "neo-orthodox" whose most prominent member is the American historian John Lewis Gaddis has emerged, which holds through the United States borne some responsibility for the Cold War, the lion's share of the responsibility goes to the Soviet Union.

=== Recent trends ===
In Europe diplomatic history fell out of favor in the late Cold War era. Since the collapse of communism in 1989–91, however, there has been a renaissance, led especially by historians of the early modern era, in the history of diplomacy. The new approach differs from previous perspectives by the wholesale incorporation of perspectives from political science, sociology, the history of mentalities, and cultural history.

In the U.S. since the 1980s, the discipline of diplomatic history has become more relevant to and better integrated with the mainstream of the academic history profession. It has taken the lead in internationalization of American historical studies. Since it explores the interaction of domestic and international forces, the field has become increasingly important for its study of culture and identity and the exploration of political ideologies as applied to foreign affairs. There have been major influences from other new approaches such as Orientalism and globalism, as well as gender and racial history. The history of human rights has become important as well. Despite all these innovations, however, the core endeavor of diplomatic history remains the study of the state interacting with other states, which is also a key to its broadening appeal, since considerations of America's superpower status is essential to understanding the world internationally.

In the early 1980s, historian Jeffrey Kimball surveyed the ideological preferences of 109 active diplomatic historians in the United States as well as 54 active military historians. He reports that:

Of historians in the field of diplomatic history, 7% are Socialist, 19% are Other, 53% are Liberal, 11% are None and 10% Conservative. Of military historians, 0% are Socialist, 8% are Other, 35% are Liberal, 18% are None and 40% are Conservative.

== Historical studies ==
In Europe, diplomatic history fell out of favor in the late Cold War era. Since the collapse of communism, there has been a renaissance, led especially by historians of the early modern era, in the history of diplomacy. The new approach differs from previous perspectives by the wholesale incorporation of perspectives from political science, sociology, the history of mentalities, and cultural history.

In the U.S. since 1980, the discipline of diplomatic history has become more relevant to and integrated with the mainstream of the historiographic profession, having been in the forefront of the internationalization of American historical studies. As a field that explores the meeting of domestic and international forces, the study of US foreign relations has become increasingly important for its examination of both the study of culture and identity and the exploration of political ideologies. Particularly shaped by the influence of studies of Orientalism and globalism, gender studies, race, and considerations of national identity, diplomatic history was often at the cutting edge of historical research. Despite such innovations, however, the core endeavor of diplomatic history remains the study of the state, which is also a key to its broadening appeal, since considerations of US state power are essential to understanding the world internationally.

== Prominent diplomatic historians ==
- Henry Brooks Adams, (1838–1918), US 1800–1816
- Henry Adams, U.S.
- Charles A. Beard, (1874–1948), revisionist history of coming of World War II
- Michael Beschloss, (born 1955) World War II; Cold War
- Samuel Flagg Bemis, U.S.
- Charles Howard Carter (1927–1990), Western Europe 1590–1635
- Winston Churchill, World War I; World War II
- Gordon A. Craig, (1913–2005) Germany
- Robert Dallek, 1930s to 1960s U.S.
- Jean-Baptiste Duroselle (1917–1994), 20th century Europe
- Herbert Feis (1893 – 1972), World War II; International trade
- Orlando Figes, (born 1957), Russian
- John Lewis Gaddis, Cold War
- Lloyd Gardner, 20th century U.S.
- Felix Gilbert, Renaissance
- George Peabody Gooch, (1873–1968), English historian of Modern Diplomacy
- Andreas Hillgruber, 20c Germany
- Akira Iriye (b. 1934) U.S. - Japan
- George F. Kennan, Russia
- Paul Kennedy, 19th and 20th century
- Henry Kissinger, (1923–2023); Nineteenth and twentieth century
- Walter LaFeber, 20th century U.S.
- William L. Langer, (1896–1977), US historian, World and diplomatic history
- John Lukacs, World War II
- Thomas J. McCormick, U.S.
- Walter A. McDougall, U.S. and European diplomatic history.
- Margaret MacMillan 20th century
- Charles S. Maier, 20th-century Europe
- William McNeill, world history
- Garrett Mattingly, Early modern Europe
- Arno J. Mayer, World War I
- Lewis Bernstein Namier, coming of World War II
- Geoffrey Parker, (born 1943) early modern
- Bradford Perkins, (1925–2008) Anglo-American relationships
- Leopold von Ranke, (1795–1886), European
- Pierre Renouvin, (1893–1974), 1815 to 1945
- Paul W. Schroeder, modern Europe
- Jean Edward Smith, Cold War
- Justin Harvey Smith, Mexican–American War
- Hew Strachan, World War I
- David Tal (historian), Israel
- A.J.P. Taylor, (1906–1990), Modern Europe, World Wars
- Harold Temperley, (1879–1939), British
- Arnold J. Toynbee, (1889–1975), 20th century
- Voltaire, (1694–1778), European
- Charles Webster, (1886–1961) British
- Gerhard Weinberg, World War Two, Germany
- John Wheeler-Bennett, British and German
- William Appleman Williams, American
- Randall Woods, 20th century U.S.
- Ernest Llewellyn Woodward, (1890–1971), British
- Karl W. Schweizer (1946-)18th century Britain/Europe
- Sergio Romano (writer) (1929), Italy and Russia

== See also ==
- British foreign policy in the Middle East
- Byzantine diplomacy
- Cold War
- Diplomacy
- Diplomatic history of Australia
- Diplomatic history of World War I
- Diplomatic history of World War II
- Eastern Question, regarding Eastern Europe and Middle East
- Foreign relations of imperial China
- Historiography of the Cold War
- Historiography of the Ottoman Empire
- Historiography of World War II
- History of espionage
- History of French foreign relations
- History of German foreign policy
- History of Japanese foreign relations
- Foreign policy of the Russian Empire
- History of the foreign relations of the United Kingdom
- History of U.S. foreign policy
  - Office of the Historian of the U.S. Department of State
  - Society for Historians of American Foreign Relations
- International relations 1648-1814
- International relations of the Great Powers (1814–1919)
- International relations (1919–1939)
- International relations since 1989
- Military history
- United States foreign policy in the Middle East

Timelines

- Timeline of British diplomatic history
- Timeline of United States diplomatic history
