= Northwestern United States =

Geographical region of the United States

Coordinates: 46°N 117°W

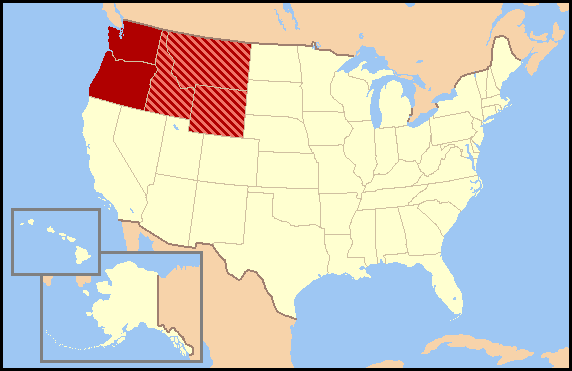
The two dark red states are almost always, and the three striped states usually, included as making up the Northwestern United States.

The Northwestern United States, also known as the American Northwest or simply the Northwest, is an informal geographic region of the United States. The region consistently includes the states of Oregon and Washington. Some sources include Idaho, Montana, Wyoming, and Southeast Alaska in the Northwest. The related but distinct term Pacific Northwest generally excludes areas from the Rockies eastward, whereas the term "Inland Northwest" excludes areas west of the Cascades.

The Northwestern United States is a subportion of the Western United States (which is, itself, even more ambiguous). In contrast, states included in the neighboring regions (Southwestern United States and Great Plains) and Utah are not simultaneously considered part of both regions.

Like the southwestern United States, the Northwest definition has moved westward over time. The current area includes the old Oregon Territory (created in 1848–Oregon, Washington, Idaho, and areas in Montana west of the Continental Divide). The region is similar to Federal Region X, which comprises Oregon, Washington, Idaho, and Alaska.

It is home to about 14.3 million people (as of 2016). Some of the fastest growing cities in this region and in the nation include Seattle, Spokane, Bellevue, Tacoma, Kennewick, Pasco, Yakima, Portland, Eugene, Salem, Boise, Idaho Falls, Missoula, Bozeman, and Billings.

== Etymology ==
As the United States' westward expansion, the country's western border also shifted westward, and consequently, so did the location of the Northwestern and Southwestern United States. In the early years of the United States, newly colonized lands lying immediately west of the Allegheny Mountains were detached from Virginia and given the name Northwest Territory. During the decades that followed, the Northwest Territory covered much of the Great Lakes region east of the Mississippi River.

== Centers of population ==
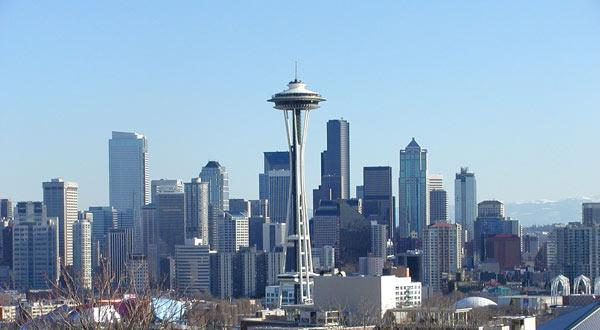
Seattle, the largest metropolitan area in the Northwest

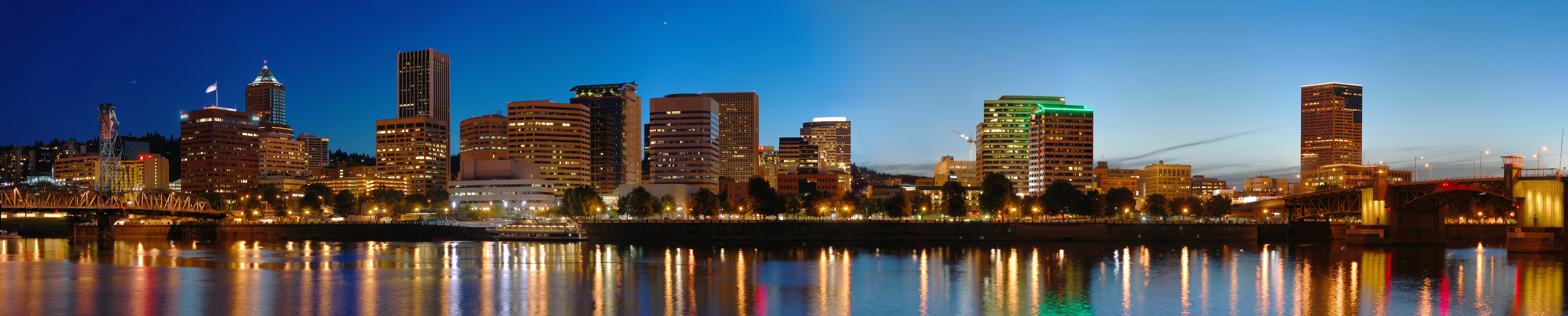
Portland, the second largest metropolitan area in the Northwest

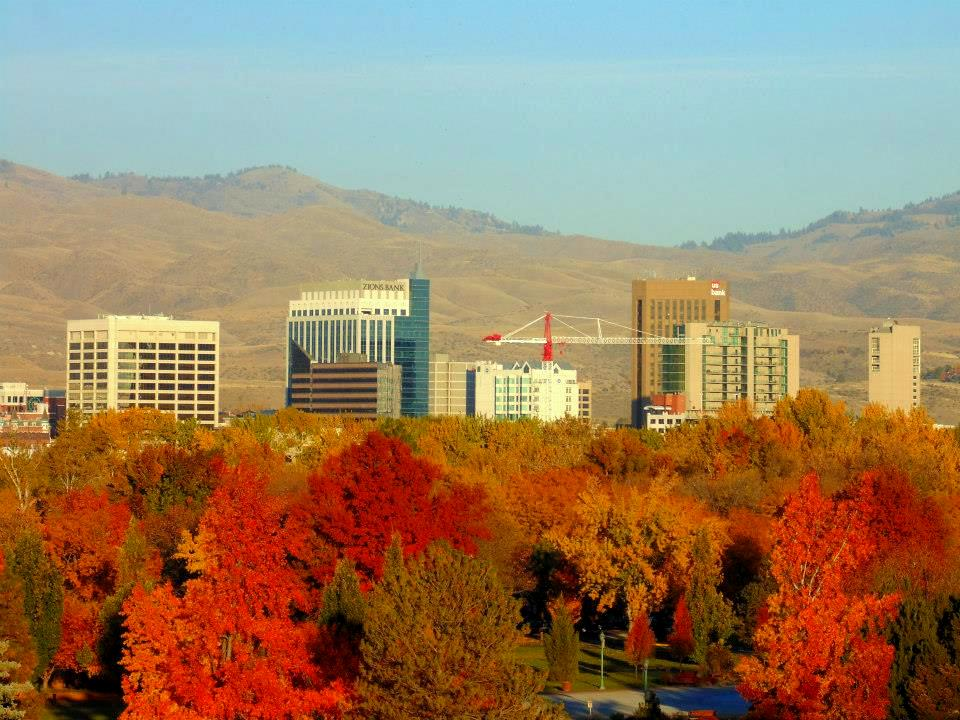
Boise, the third largest metropolitan area in the Northwest

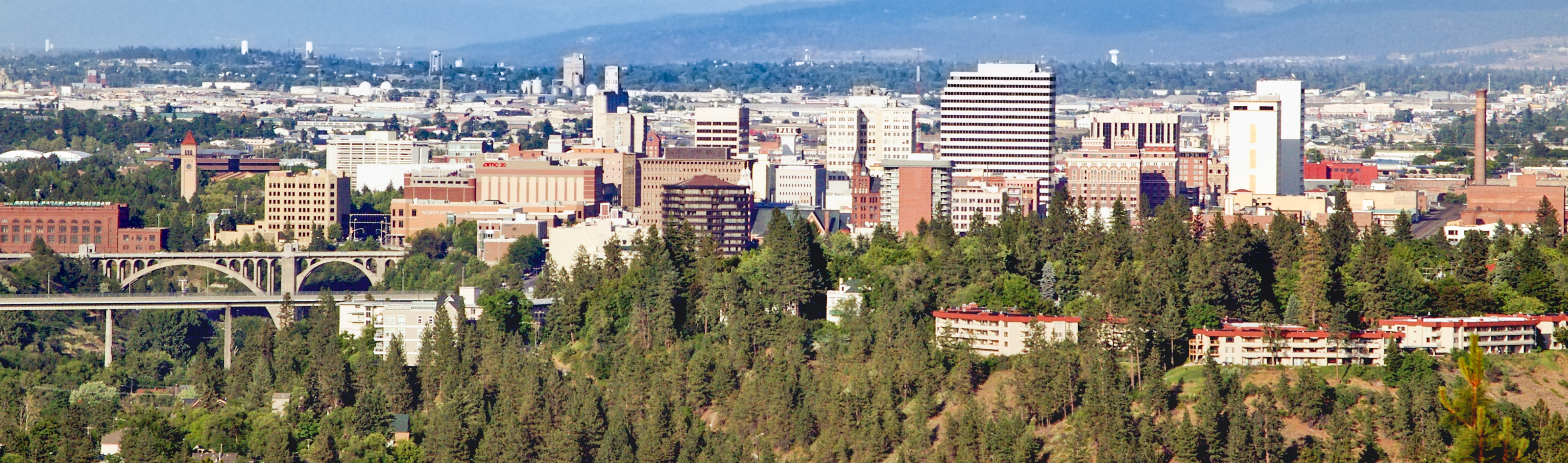
Spokane, the fourth largest metropolitan area in the Northwest

As of 2016, the Northwestern states have a cumulative population of 14,297,316, with Oregon and Washington accounting for 77% of the entire five-state region's population. As of 2016, there are 25 metropolitan statistical areas in the Northwest with populations of 100,000 or more, none of which are in Wyoming. Since adjacent metropolitan areas often function as one combined agglomeration, the U.S. Census Bureau additionally defines nine combined statistical areas across the Northwest, eight of which having populations of 100,000 or more.

Rank	Combined or Metropolitan Statistical Area	State(s)	Population (2020)
1	Seattle–Tacoma	Washington	4,018,598
2	Portland–Vancouver–Salem	Oregon; Washington	2,510,259
3	Boise–Mountain Home–Ontario	Idaho; Oregon	845,877
4	Spokane–Spokane Valley–Coeur d'Alene	Washington; Idaho	793,285
5	Eugene-Springfield	Oregon	382,986
6	Medford–Grants Pass	Oregon	221,844
7	Kennewick–Pasco–Richland-Walla Walla	Washington	303,501
8	Yakima	Washington	251,879
9	Idaho Falls–Rexburg–Blackfoot	Idaho	155,361
10	Bellingham	Washington	131,016

== Presidential elections ==
(Green indicates Populist Party affiliation, peach indicates the Republican Party, blue indicates the Democratic Party, and plum indicates the Bull Moose Party.)

Presidential electoral votes in the Northwestern States since 1892
Year	Idaho	Montana	Oregon	Washington	Wyoming
1892	Weaver	Harrison	Harrison	Harrison	Harrison
1896	Bryan	Bryan	McKinley	Bryan	Bryan
1900	Bryan	Bryan	McKinley	McKinley	McKinley
1904	T. Roosevelt	T. Roosevelt	T. Roosevelt	T. Roosevelt	T. Roosevelt|
1908	Taft	Taft	Taft	Taft	Taft
1912	Wilson	Wilson	Wilson	T. Roosevelt	Wilson
1916	Wilson	Wilson	Hughes	Wilson	Wilson
1920	Harding	Harding	Harding	Harding	Harding
1924	Coolidge	Coolidge	Coolidge	Coolidge	Coolidge
1928	Hoover	Hoover	Hoover	Hoover	Hoover
1932	F. Roosevelt	F. Roosevelt	F. Roosevelt	F. Roosevelt	F. Roosevelt
1936	F. Roosevelt	F. Roosevelt	F. Roosevelt	F. Roosevelt	F. Roosevelt
1940	F. Roosevelt	F. Roosevelt	F. Roosevelt	F. Roosevelt	F. Roosevelt
1944	F. Roosevelt	F. Roosevelt	F. Roosevelt	F. Roosevelt	Dewey
1948	Truman	Truman	Dewey	Truman	Truman
1952	Eisenhower	Eisenhower	Eisenhower	Eisenhower	Eisenhower
1956	Eisenhower	Eisenhower	Eisenhower	Eisenhower	Eisenhower
1960	Nixon	Nixon	Nixon	Nixon	Nixon
1964	Johnson	Johnson	Johnson	Johnson	Johnson
1968	Nixon	Nixon	Nixon	Humphrey	Nixon
1972	Nixon	Nixon	Nixon	Nixon	Nixon
1976	Ford	Ford	Ford	Ford	Ford
1980	Reagan	Reagan	Reagan	Reagan	Reagan
1984	Reagan	Reagan	Reagan	Reagan	Reagan
1988	Bush	Bush	Dukakis	Dukakis	Bush
1992	Bush	Clinton	Clinton	Clinton	Bush
1996	Dole	Dole	Clinton	Clinton	Dole
2000	Bush	Bush	Gore	Gore	Bush
2004	Bush	Bush	Kerry	Kerry	Bush
2008	McCain	McCain	Obama	Obama	McCain
2012	Romney	Romney	Obama	Obama	Romney
2016	Trump	Trump	Clinton	Clinton	Trump
2020	Trump	Trump	Biden	Biden	Trump
2024	Trump	Trump	Harris	Harris	Trump

== See also ==
- List of online encyclopedias of U.S. states
- Northwest Territorial Imperative, a proposed White ethnostate in the Pacific Northwest (Washington, Oregon, Idaho and a portion of Montana), proposed by many white nationalists
- American Redoubt, a proposed political migration movement that designates Idaho, Montana, and Wyoming, along with parts of Oregon and Washington, as a safe haven for conservative Christians
