= Connecticut History =

Connecticut History may refer to:

- History of Connecticut
- Connecticut History (encyclopedia), an online encyclopedia
