= Bellush =

Bellush is a surname. Notable people with the surname include:

- Bernard Bellush (1917–2011), American historian and journalist
- Sheila Bellush (c. 1962–1997), murdered 35-year-old mother of six

== See also ==
- Bellús
