= Americans at Work =

Americans at Work may refer to:

- Americans at Work, an Adult Education Series program on CBS Radio
- Americans at Work, a 1937 television show by Gilbert Seldes
- Americans at Work, a series of lectures by historian Herbert Gutman
- Americans at Work, Past and Present: Agriculture, an artwork made in 1938 by Concetta Scaravaglione at the Federal Trade Commission Building, Washington District of Columbia
- Americans at Work, a television series produced by the AFL–CIO from 1958 to 1961 in response to the series Industry on Parade
