= Allan Nevins =

American historian and journalist (1890–1971)

- Born: Joseph Allan Nevins Jr. May 20, 1890; Camp Point, Illinois, U.S.
- Died: March 5, 1971 (aged 80); San Mateo, California, U.S.
- Spouse: Mary Fleming Richardson

Academic background
- Education: University of Illinois (MA)

Academic work
- Institutions: Columbia University
- Doctoral students: Bernard Bellush; Margaret Clapp; Louis Filler; Philip S. Foner; Carlton C. Qualey; James A. Rawley

Joseph Allan Nevins Jr. (May 20, 1890 – March 5, 1971) was an American historian and journalist. Nevins was known for his extensive work on the history of the American Civil War and his biographies of such figures as Grover Cleveland, Hamilton Fish, Henry Ford, and John D. Rockefeller, as well as his public service. He was a leading exponent of business history and oral history.

== Early life and education ==
Joseph Allan Nevins Jr. was born May 20, 1890 in Camp Point, Illinois. His parents were Emma (née Stahl) and Joseph Allan Nevins Sr., whom Allan later described as a stern Presbyterian farmer. His father was of Scottish heritage and his mother German.

After education in local public schools, Nevins attended the University of Illinois, where he earned an M.A. in English in 1913.

He married Mary Fleming (Richardson) in 1916, and the couple had two daughters, Anne Elizabeth and Meredith.

== Career ==
Nevins wrote his first book, The Life of Robert Rogers (1914) (about a Colonial American frontiersman and Loyalist) and a history of the University of Illinois (1917) during his postgraduate studies in that institution.

Nevins then accepted positions with the New York Evening Post and The Nation and worked as a journalist in New York City for twenty years, as well as continued writing and editing history books. He resigned from the Nation in 1918, and the Post about a year after publishing its history The Evening Post: A Century of Journalism in 1922. In 1923 Nevins published American Social History as Recorded by British Travellers (reissued as America through British Eyes in 1957) and The American States During and After the Revolution, 1775–1789 in 1924.

In 1924 Nevins resigned from the Post to become literary editor of the New York Sun and about a year later gave up that position to become an editorial writer with the New York World. Nevins continued extensive private research in the New York Public Library and published The Emergence of Modern America, 1865–1878 in 1927, and a biography of explorer John Charles Frémont, Frémont: The West's Greatest Adventurer in 1928. During a leave of absence from his newspaper job, Nevins spent a term teaching American history at Cornell University. Arthur M. Schlesinger, Sr., arranged for Nevins to have this position.

As a journalist, Nevins covered the campaigns of Al Smith. After the 1928 Presidential Campaign which he covered for Walter Lippmann, Nevins grew dismayed at what he perceived as intolerance and provincialism, religious bigotry and racial prejudice in the American South, which as a historian he contrasted to religious freedom and separation of church and state that the same region had brought to the new nation in the revolutionary era.

In 1928, Nevins joined the history faculty of Columbia University, where he remained for three decades until his mandatory retirement in 1958. In 1931 he gave up his journalism job in order to become a full-time faculty member and in 1939 succeeded Evarts Boutell Greene (his teacher at Illinois and mentor at Columbia), as the DeWitt Clinton Professor of History. His major works during this period included: Grover Cleveland: A Study in Courage (1932, which won his first Pulitzer Prize), History of the Bank of New York and Trust Company, 1784–1934 (1934), Hamilton Fish: The Inner Story of the Grant Administration (1936, which won his second Pulitzer Prize), The Gateway to History (1938), a two-volume biography of John D. Rockefeller, The Heroic Age of American Enterprise (1940; rewritten and expanded as A Study in Power: John D. Rockefeller, Industrialist and Philanthropist in 1953).

During World War II, Professor Nevins taught (as Harmsworth Professor of American History) at Oxford University from 1940 to 1941. In 1942, he published America: The Story of A Free People (with Henry Steele Commager, reworked and republished in 1954). Nevins served as special representative of the Office of War Information in Australia and New Zealand in 1943–1944, and in 1945–1946 worked in London as chief public affairs officer at the American embassy.

Upon returning to Columbia, Nevins began working on a multi-volume series on the American Civil War. The first volume The Ordeal of The Union (1947) won the Bancroft Prize and a $10,000 Scribners Literary Prize. In 1948 Nevins created the first oral history program to operate on an institutionalized basis in the U.S., which continues as Columbia University's Center for Oral History. In addition to publishing four more volumes of the Civil War series, Nevins reworked the Rockefeller biography to cast a more favorable light upon the magnate. In 1954 with Frank Hill, Nevins published the first of a three-volume biography of Henry Ford and the Ford Motor Company, Ford: The Times, the Man, and the Company.

From May 6, 1938, until August 18, 1957, Nevins hosted a 15-minute radio show Adventures in Science, which covered a wide variety of medical and scientific topics, and was broadcast as a segment of CBS' Adult Education Series various days, usually in the late afternoon.

After retiring from Columbia, Nevins relocated to California, where he worked as senior researcher at the Huntington Library in San Marino, and also returned to Oxford from 1964 to 1965. Nevins also publicly supported John F. Kennedy in the 1960 Presidential Campaign and wrote an introduction for Kennedy's Profiles in Courage. Nevins headed the national Civil War Centennial Commission, edited its 15-volume Impact series and finished the final volumes of his eight-volume series on the American Civil War. He also published Herbert H. Lehman and His Era (1963) and James Truslow Adams: Historian of the American Dream (1968).

In 1966, Nevins received the Golden Plate Award of the American Academy of Achievement.

As an historian, Nevins supervised more than 100 doctoral dissertations, published over 50 books and possibly more than 1000 articles, as well as serving as president of the American Historical Association, the Society of American Historians, and the American Academy of Arts and Letters.

== Death and legacy ==
Nevins died in Menlo Park, California, in 1971. He was buried at Kensico Cemetery in Westchester County, New York. The last two volumes of his Civil War series won the U.S. National Book Award in History in 1972. Historians including Ray Allen Billington compiled Allan Nevins on History (1975) to celebrate his accomplishments. His granddaughter Jane Mayer also became a journalist and author. The Society of American Historians awards an Allan Nevins Prize annually in his honor.

== Published work ==
Nevins wrote more than 50 books, mainly political and business history and biography focusing on the nineteenth century, in addition to his many newspaper and academic articles. The hallmarks of his books were his extensive, in-depth research and a vigorous, almost journalistic writing style. Subjects of his biographies included: Grover Cleveland, Abram Hewitt, Hamilton Fish, Henry Ford, John C. Frémont, Herbert Lehman, John D. Rockefeller, and Henry White. The biographies cover United States political, economic and diplomatic history of the late 19th and early 20th centuries. His biography of Grover Cleveland won the 1933 Pulitzer Prize for Biography or Autobiography, as did his biography of Hamilton Fish four years later. Nevins also published an annotated diary of President James K. Polk, and a volume of Cleveland's correspondence spanning the years 1850–1908.

=== Ordeal of the Union ===
Nevins' greatest work was Ordeal of the Union (1947–1971), an 8-volume comprehensive history of the coming of the Civil war, and the war itself. (He died before he could address Reconstruction, and thus his masterwork ends in 1865.) It remains the most detailed political, economic and military narrative of the era. Nevins's Ordeal of the Union has a slight but perceptible pro-Union bias, just as Shelby Foote's three-volume masterwork has a slight but perceptible bias towards the Confederacy. The last two volumes jointly won the 1972 U.S. National Book Award in History.

Nevins also planned and helped to edit a pioneering 13-volume series exploring American social history, "A History of American Life".

His biographer explained Nevins' style:

Nevins used narrative not only to tell a story but to propound moral lessons. It was not his inclination to deal in intellectual concepts or theories, like many academic scholars. He preferred emphasizing practical notions about the importance of national unity, principled leadership, [classical] liberal politics, enlightened journalism, the social responsibility of business and industry, and scientific and technical progress that added to the cultural improvement of humanity.

=== John D. Rockefeller ===
Nevins wrote several books on John D. Rockefeller and the Rockefeller family, including a two-volume authorized biography of John D. Rockefeller. Business journalist Ferdinand Lundberg later criticized Nevins for deferring to power and thereby misleading readers. By contrast, historian Priscilla Roberts argues that his studies of inventors and businessmen brought about a reassessment of American industrialization and its leaders. She writes:

Nevins argued that economic development in the United States caused relatively little human suffering, while raising the general standard of living and making the United States the great industrial power capable of defeating Germany in both world wars. The great capitalists of that period should, he argued, be viewed, not as "robber barons", but as men whose economic self-interest had played an essentially, positive role in American history, and who had done nothing criminal by the standards of their time.

In contending that Rockefeller did "nothing criminal", in light of his central role in the Ludlow Massacre, Nevins seems to have equated non-prosecution with innocence.

Historians and biographers who followed Nevins' lead include Jean Strouse, Ron Chernow, David Nasaw, and T. J. Stiles, chronicling the lives and careers of such figures as J. Pierpont Morgan, John D. Rockefeller, Andrew Carnegie, and Cornelius Vanderbilt. Though these later biographers did not confer heroic status on their subjects, they used historical and biographical investigations to establish a more complex understanding of the American past, and the history of American economic development in particular.

=== John F. Kennedy ===
An enthusiastic supporter of then-Senator John F. Kennedy, Nevins wrote the foreword to the inaugural edition of Kennedy's Profiles in Courage. He also joined his friend, frequent co-editor, and Columbia colleague Henry Steele Commager in organizing "Professors for Kennedy", a political advocacy group in the 1960 presidential election. In the late 1960s Nevins and Commager parted ways over the issue of the Vietnam War, a war that Commager opposed on constitutional grounds, while Nevins thought it necessary in the Cold War against Communism.

=== Major books ===
Many of the titles are available free online here

- The Evening Post; a Century of Journalism (1922), history of the NYC newspaper online
- The American States During and After the Revolution, 1775–1789 (1927) online editiononline free
- A History of American Life vol. VIII: The Emergence of Modern America 1865–1878 (1927)
- Frémont, the West's Greatest Adventurer; being a biography from certain hitherto unpublished sources of General John C. Frémont, together with his wife, Jessie Benton Frémont, and some account of the period of expansion which found a brilliant leader in the Pathfinder. 1928. Archived from the original on June 4, 2011 – via Questia.
- Polk: The Diary of President, 1845–1849, covering the Mexican war, the acquisition of Oregon, and the conquest of California and the Southwest (1929)
- Henry White: Thirty Years of American Diplomacy (1930)
- Grover Cleveland: A Study in Courage (1932). Won the 1933 Pulitzer Prize for Biography or Autobiography.
- Letters of Grover Cleveland, 1850–1908 (1933)
- Dictionary of American Biography (1934–1936); Nevins wrote 40 articles on Alexander Hamilton, Rutherford B. Hayes, Warren G. Harding, Calvin Coolidge, etc.
- Abram Hewitt: With Some Account of Peter Cooper (1935)
- Hamilton Fish; The Inner History of the Grant Administration (1936) online edition vol 1 online edition vol 2
- The Gateway to History. 1938. Archived from the original on October 8, 2012 – via Questia.
- John D. Rockefeller: The Heroic Age of American Enterprise. 2 vols. New York: Charles Scribner's Sons (1940)
- The Emergence of Modern America, 1865–1878 (1941)
- Ordeal of the Union (1947–1971) online here
  1. Fruits of Manifest Destiny, 1847–1852 (1947);
  2. A House Dividing, 1852–1857 (1947);
  3. Douglas, Buchanan, and Party Chaos, 1857–1859 (1950);
  4. Prologue to Civil War, 1859–1861 (1950);
  5. The Improvised War, 1861–1862 (1959);
  6. War Becomes Revolution, 1862–1863 (1960);
  7. The Organized War, 1863–1864 (1960);
  8. The Organized War to Victory, 1864–1865 (1971)
- Study In Power: John D. Rockefeller, Industrialist and Philanthropist. 2 vols. New York: Charles Scribner's Sons. (1953)
- Ford with the collaboration of Frank Ernest Hill. 3 vols. (1954–1963)
