= Virginia Humanities =

Humanities organization in Virginia, US

Virginia Humanities (VH), formerly the Virginia Foundation for the Humanities, is a humanities council whose stated mission is to develop the civic, cultural, and intellectual life of the Commonwealth of Virginia by creating learning opportunities for all Virginians. VH aims to bring the humanities fully into Virginia's public life, assisting individuals and communities in their efforts to understand the past, confront important issues in the present, and shape a promising future.

== History ==
Since its founding in 1974, VH has sponsored more than 40,000 humanities programs across the Commonwealth. VH is one of 56 state humanities councils that are part of the Federation of State Humanities Councils. Humanities councils were created by the United States Congress in 1974 and receive an annual congressional appropriation through the National Endowment for the Humanities, which for most councils is supplemented by state and private funding. In March 2018 it assumed the new, shortened name Virginia Humanities.

== Location ==
VH is headquartered in Charlottesville, Virginia, on the campus of the University of Virginia.

== Activities ==
VH activities are conducted through direct funding, through working partnerships with other organizations, and through statewide and national initiatives. VH's areas of focus are broken down into:

- Books, Reading, and Literacy—the importance of the text as a means of transmitting, exploring, and broadening our understanding of the human experience.
- Media and Culture—the global influence of electronic media on culture, how the media may promote or undermine positive social change, and how media may influence individual perception and creative thinking.
- Violence and Culture—the roots of violence and personal dislocation, and the struggle for individual survival and self-determination within systems of violence.
- Rights and Responsibilities—the still-evolving American traditions of self-government and justice, and the special role Virginia has played in shaping the concept of freedom worldwide.
- Science, Technology, and Social Change—advances in science and technology, the challenges and opportunities they create, and how they are redefining culture and community life.
- Virginia History—the stories of Virginia, its people and institutions, with particular emphasis on the history of minority communities in the state.

VH operates both the Virginia Center for the Book and the annual Virginia Festival of the Book.

VH produces the radio show With Good Reason.

== BackStory with the American History Guys ==
BackStory was a radio show, and later weekly podcast, that used current events in America to take a deep dive into the country's past. Hosted by noted U.S. historians, each episode provides listeners with different perspectives on a particular theme or subject. The podcast is hosted by Brian Balogh, Ed Ayers, Nathan Connolly, and Joanne Freeman. Peter S. Onuf, along with Balogh and Ayers, founded the podcast in 2008. The show ended in 2020.

== Encyclopedia Virginia ==
Encyclopedia Virginia (EV) is a multi-year project of Virginia Humanities. "The purpose of EV is to become the first point of reference for all users interested in Virginia and to provide authoritative and accessible information for students, teachers, scholars, and business, industry, and government when they have a question about Virginia's history and culture."

On May 24, 2007, the then-Virginia Foundation for the Humanities announced a $100,000 grant from Dominion Energy's Dominion Foundation for Encyclopedia Virginia.

== See also ==
- List of state humanities councils
- List of online encyclopedias of U.S. states
