= Isaac Joslin Cox =

American professor of history

Isaac Joslin Cox, Ph.D. (November 19, 1873–October 31, 1956) was an American professor of history.

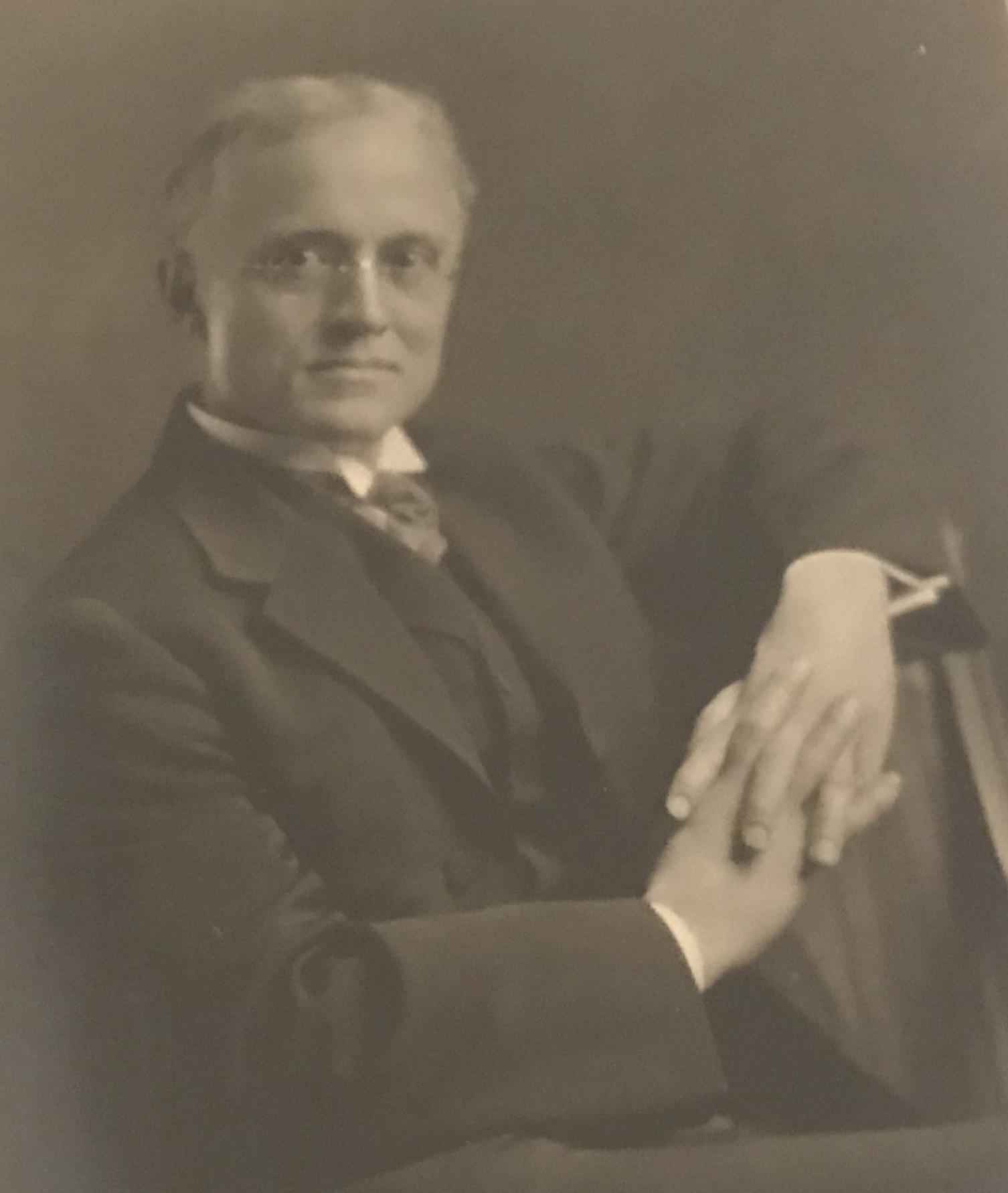
Dr. Isaac Joslin Cox retired as Chairman of the history department at Northwestern University in 1928

He was born at West Creek, Ocean Co., N. J. He graduated from Dartmouth College and for several years did research in Mexico. He then pursued postgraduate studies at the universities of Texas, Chicago, Wisconsin, and Pennsylvania.

Between 1896 and 1906, Cox was employed at the San Antonio Academy as instructor and vice-principal, and instructor in history at the University of Cincinnati, where he was afterward assistant professor. In 1911-12, he delivered the Albert Shaw Lectures on Diplomatic History at Johns Hopkins University, and in 1919 became professor of history at Northwestern University. He was president of the Ohio Valley Historical Association.

== Works ==
- The Journeys of La Salle and his Companions (two volumes, 1905)
- The Early Exploration of Louisiana (1906)
- The Indian as a Diplomatic Factor in the History of the Old Northwest (1910)
- West Florida Controversy, 1798-1813; A Study In American Diplomacy. (1918)
- Nicaragua and the United States, 1909-1927 (1927)

== See also ==
- Bibliography of the Burr conspiracy
