= Gordon A. Craig =

American historian

Gordon Craig
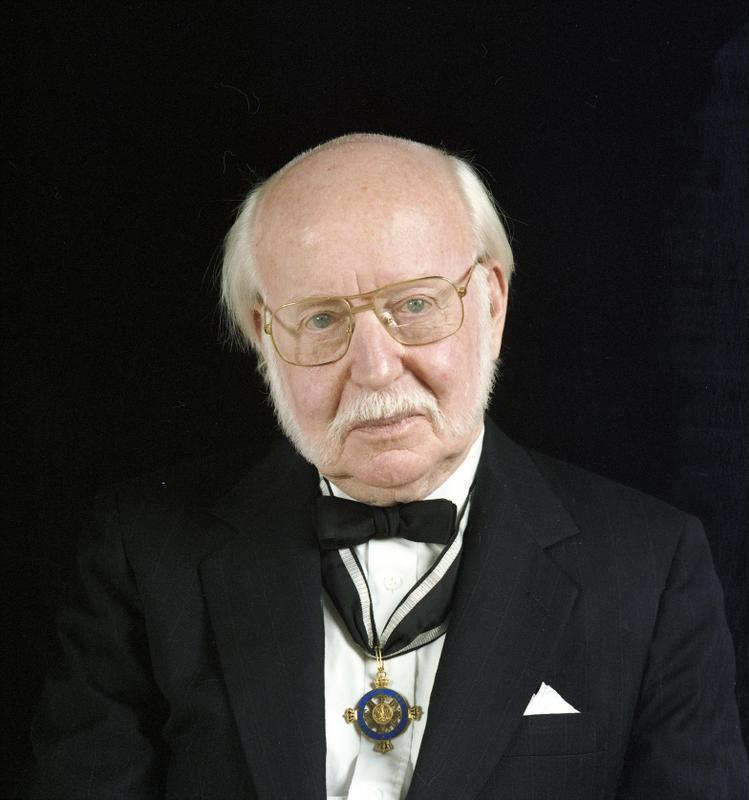
- Craig in 1991
- Born: 13 November 1913; Glasgow, Scotland, British Empire
- Died: 30 October 2005 (aged 91)
- Spouse: Phyllis
- Children: 4

Gordon Alexander Craig (November 13, 1913 – October 30, 2005) was a Scottish-American liberal historian of German history and of diplomatic history.

== Early life ==
Craig was born in Glasgow. In 1925, he emigrated with his family to Toronto, Ontario, Canada, and then to Jersey City, New Jersey. Initially interested in studying the law, he switched to history after hearing the historian Walter "Buzzer" Hall lecture at Princeton University. In 1935, Craig visited and lived for several months in Germany to research a thesis he was writing on the downfall of the Weimar Republic. This trip marked the beginning of lifelong interest with all things German. Craig did not enjoy the atmosphere of Germany, and throughout his life, he sought to find the answer to the question of how a people who, in his opinion, had made a disproportionately large contribution to Western civilization, allowed themselves to become entangled in what Craig saw as the corrupting embrace of Nazism.

Of Adolf Hitler, Craig once wrote,

Adolf Hitler was sui generis, a force without a real historical past ... dedicated to the acquisition of power for his own gratification and to the destruction of a people whose existence was an offense to him and whose annihilation would be his crowning triumph. Both the grandiose barbarism of his political vision and the moral emptiness of his character make it impossible to compare him in any meaningful way with any other German leader. He stands alone.

== Education and career ==
Craig graduated in history from Princeton University, was a Rhodes Scholar at Balliol College, Oxford, from 1936 to 1938, and served in the U.S. Marine Corps as a captain and in the Office of Strategic Services during World War II. In 1941, he co-edited with Edward Earle and Felix Gilbert, on behalf of the American War Department, the book Makers of Modern Strategy: Military Thought From Machiavelli to Hitler, which was intended to serve as a guide to strategic thinking for military leaders during the war.

After 1945, Craig worked as a consultant to the U.S. Arms Control and Disarmament Agency, the State Department, the U.S. Air Force Academy and the Historical Division of the U.S. Marine Corps. He was a professor at Princeton University from 1950 to 1961 and at Stanford University from 1961 to 1979. From 1956 to 1957, he taught at the Center for Advanced Study in the Behavioral Sciences. In addition, he often held visiting professorships at the Free University of Berlin. In 1967, Craig was the only professor there to sign a petition asking for an investigation into charges of police brutality towards protesting students. Craig was chair of the history department at Stanford in 1972–1975 and 1978–1979. Between 1975 and 1985, he served as the vice-president of the Comité International des Sciences Historiques. In 1979, he became an emeritus professor and was awarded the title J. E. Wallace Sterling Professor of Humanities.

During his time at Stanford, Craig was considered to be a popular and innovative teacher who improved both undergraduate and graduate teaching, while remaining well liked by the students. After his retirement, he worked as a book reviewer for the New York Review of Books. Some of his reviews attracted controversy, most notably in April 1996, when he praised Daniel Goldhagen's book Hitler's Willing Executioners and later in September of the same year when he argued that David Irving's work was valuable because of what Craig saw as Irving's devil's advocate role. Craig argued that Irving was usually wrong, but that by promoting what Craig saw as a twisted and wrongheaded view of history with a great deal of élan, Irving forced other historians to fruitfully examine their beliefs about what is known about the Third Reich. Craig later took back and apologized for his positive review of Goldhagen's work.

Craig was formerly President of the American Historical Association. He was also a member of the American Academy of Arts and Sciences and the American Philosophical Society. In 1953, together with his friend Felix Gilbert, he edited a prosopography of inter-war diplomats entitled The Diplomats, an important source for diplomatic history in the interwar period. He followed this book with studies on the Prussian Army, the Battle of Königgrätz and many aspects of European and German history. Craig was particularly noted for his contribution to the Oxford History of Modern Europe series entitled Germany, 1866–1945 and its companion volume, The Germans. The latter was a wide-ranging cultural history that explored aspects of being German, such as attitudes towards German-Jewish relations, money, students, women, and democracy, amongst others. The book was a best-seller in both the United States and Germany and Craig was awarded the Pour le Mérite medal for this book. Increasingly interested in cultural history in his later years, Craig subsequently wrote studies of several German writers, most notably Theodor Fontane. During this time, he also emerged as a celebrity in the German-speaking world, frequently appearing as a guest on German television talk shows. By his later years, Craig was widely regarded as the doyen of American historians of Germany, and his opinions carried much weight.

Craig died in 2005, and was survived by his widow Phyllis, four children and eight grandchildren.

== Personal views ==
Craig saw modern German history as a struggle between the positive, as exemplified by the values of humanist intellectuals, and negative forces in German life, as exemplified by Nazism. In a broader sense, he viewed this conflict as between enlightened spirit and authoritarian power. He was highly critical of those who saw Nazism as the culmination of German national character, while at the same time criticizing those who argued that Nazi Germany was just a Betriebsunfall (industrial accident) of history. Craig felt that the particular way Otto von Bismarck created the German Empire in 1871 was a tragedy, as it entrenched the forces of authoritarianism in German life. Similarly, Craig viewed the autonomous role of the German Army as a "State-within-the-State" as highly adverse to the development of democracy.

Craig considered history not to be a social science, but rather a "human discipline". He censured those historians who saw their work as social science and frequently called for historians to return to the methods of former times by seeking to "interconnect" history and literature. Craig was noted for his sparse, highly elegant literary style, together with a tendency to keep an ironic distance from his subjects. He was very fond of German literature, and praised the novels of Theodor Fontane as the best portrayal of 19th century Germany, which he considered superior to many works produced by historians. Craig's last project, incomplete at the time of his death, was a survey of novels set in Berlin – Craig's favorite city – in the 20th century.

== Works ==
- Edward Mead Earle and Felix Gilbert (1943). Makers of Modern Strategy; Military Thought From Machiavelli to Hitler. (published in revised edition, 1967)
- The Second Chance: America And The Peace. 1949.
- Felix Gilbert (1953). The Diplomats 1919–1939. Princeton, Princeton University Press.
- The Politics of the Prussian Army 1640–1945. 1955. OCLC 275199. (published in revised edition, 1964)
- From Bismarck to Adenauer: Aspects of German Statecraft. 1958. OCLC 1260303.
- The Battle of Königgrätz: Prussia's Victory Over Austria, 1866. 1964. (published in revised edition, 1975)
- War, Politics, And Diplomacy. 1966. OCLC 392572.
- World War I, A Turning Point In Modern History: Essays On The Significance Of The War. 1967. OCLC 306592.
- Europe Since 1914. 1972.
- Europe Since 1815. 1974.
- Craig, Gordon Alexander (1978). Germany, 1866–1945. Oxford University Press. ISBN 978-0-19-822113-5. OCLC 4098841. (a volume in the Oxford History of Modern Europe series)
- "On the nature of diplomatic history: The relevance of some old books" in Diplomacy: new approaches in history, theory and policy. Lauren, Paul Gordon (ed.). 1979. (New York: Free Press. pp. 21–42
- The Germans. Penguin. 1981. ISBN 978-0-14-022569-3. OCLC 11689319.
- The End Of Prussia. 1984.
- Peter Paret and Felix Gilbert (1986). Makers Of Modern Strategy: From Machiavelli To The Nuclear Age. Princeton University Press. ISBN 978-0-691-02764-7. OCLC 12370286.
- The Triumph Of Liberalism: Zürich In The Golden Age, 1830–1869. Scribner. 1988.
- Force And Statecraft: Diplomatic Problems Of Our Time. 1990.
- Geneva, Zurich, Basel: History, Culture & National Identity. 1994.
- Francis L. Loewenheim (1994). The Diplomats, 1939–1979.
- The Politics Of The Unpolitical: German Writers And The Problem Of Power, 1770–1871. 1995.
- Politics And Culture In Modern Germany. 1999.
- Theodor Fontane: Literature and History in the Bismarck Reich. 1999.
