= Charles Howard Carter =

American historian and academic (1927–1990)

- Born: April 3, 1927; Baker, Oregon
- Died: March 24, 1990 (aged 62)

Academic background
- Education: Columbia University

Academic work
- Era: 20th century
- Discipline: Historian
- Sub-discipline: Early-modernist
- Institutions: Tulane University
- Main interests: History of diplomacy
- Notable works: The Secret Diplomacy of the Habsburgs, 1598–1625 (1964)

Charles Howard Carter (1927–1990) was a historian, researcher, author, and professor of History at Tulane University from 1963 to 1990.

Carter was born in Baker, Oregon. He studied at Willamette University and the University of Chicago, and ultimately got his degrees from Columbia University under Garrett Mattingly, whose Festschrift he later edited. He graduated B.S. (1957), M.A. (1958), and Ph.D. (1961). He instigated a project to microfilm diplomatic documents from Western Europe for the period 1590-1635 which provided shared access to materials from the British Library, the Public Record Office, the National Archives of Belgium, the Bibliothèque nationale de France, the Biblioteca Nacional de España and the Archivo General de Simancas. Before becoming a professor at Tulane, Carter taught at Long Island University and the University of Oregon.

At the time of his death, Carter was working on a monograph on the relationship between James VI and I and the Spanish ambassador Diego Sarmiento de Acuña, 1st Count of Gondomar. His papers are kept in the Special Collections of the Milton S. Eisenhower Library at the Johns Hopkins University.

== Works ==
- The Secret Diplomacy of the Habsburgs, 1598–1625 (1964)
- The Western European Powers, 1500–1700 (1971)
- editor: From the Renaissance to the Counter-Reformation: Essays in Honor of Garrett Mattingly (1965)
