= John A. DeNovo =

American historian

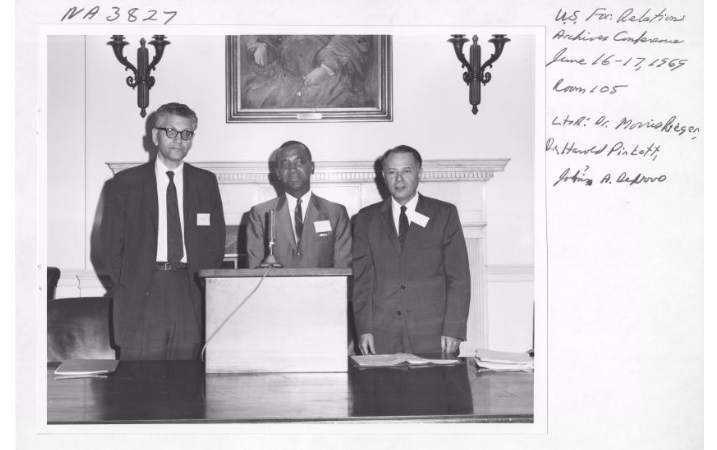
Conference on the Archives of United States Foreign Relations, July 16–17, 1969. Pictured standing together from left to right are: Dr. Morris Rieger, Dr. Harold T. Pinkett and John A. DeNovo.

John August DeNovo (November 5, 1916 – January 26, 2000) was an American historian. He was a leading scholar in the field of U.S.-Middle East relations.

== Biography ==
He was born in Galva, Illinois in 1916, and attended Knox College for his B.A., graduating in 1938. He then attended the University of Minnesota and received an M.A. in history in 1940. He served as a lieutenant in the United States Navy during World War II, and was for a time Port Director in Nouméa, New Caledonia. Following the war he attended Yale University for his PhD under the direction of Samuel Flagg Bemis, and graduated in 1948.

From 1948 to 1964 he taught at Pennsylvania State University, where he advanced from instructor to full professor. In the 1963–1964 academic year he was a visiting professor at Cornell University, and the following year moved to the University of Wisconsin–Madison, where he joined William Appleman Williams in teaching the history of U.S. foreign relations.

During his time at Pennsylvania State University and the University of Wisconsin, he advised fifteen PhD candidates, including Roger R. Trask, Mark A. Stoler, and John L. Offner.

== Bibliography ==
- American Interests and Policies in the Middle East, 1900-1939 (1963)
