= Samuel Flagg Bemis =

American historian and biographer

- Born: October 20, 1891; Worcester, Massachusetts, US
- Died: September 26, 1973 (aged 81); Bridgeport, Connecticut, US
- Spouse: Ruth Marjorie Steele (m. 1919)
- Children: 1
- Awards: Pulitzer Prize (1927; 1950)

Academic background
- Education: Clark University; Harvard University
- Doctoral advisor: Edward Channing
- Other advisor: J. Franklin Jameson

Academic work
- Discipline: History
- Sub-discipline: Diplomatic history
- Institutions: Colorado College; Whitman College; George Washington University; Yale University
- Doctoral students: Robert H. Ferrell; John A. DeNovo; William W. Kaufmann
- Notable works: Pinckney's Treaty: America's Advantage from Europe's Distress, 1783–1800, John Quincy Adams and the Foundations of American Foreign Policy, John Quincy Adams and the Union, The American Secretaries of State and Their Diplomacy series

Samuel Flagg Bemis (October 20, 1891 – September 26, 1973) was an American historian and biographer. For many years he taught at Yale University. He was also president of the American Historical Association and a specialist in American diplomatic history. He was awarded two Pulitzer Prizes. Jerald A. Combs says he was "the greatest of all historians of early American diplomacy."

== Biography ==
Bemis was born in Worcester, Massachusetts, on what he remembered as "the wrong side of the hedge". He received his B.A. degree in 1912 from Clark University. Influenced by George Hubbard Blakeslee of the Clark faculty, Bemis also acquired an A.M. from Clark the following year. In 1916 he was granted his Ph.D. by Harvard University. He first taught at Colorado College from 1917 to 1921. From 1921 to 1923, he taught at Whitman College in Walla Walla, Washington. In 1923–1924, he served as a research associate at the Carnegie Institution of Washington's Division of Historical Research. Bemis joined the faculty at George Washington University in 1924, remaining there a decade, and accepted the history department's chairmanship in 1925. From 1927 to 1929, he led the Library of Congress's European Mission. He left George Washington University in 1934, first serving as lecturer at Harvard University for the 1934–1935 academic year while James Phinney Baxter III was on research leave. Then, in 1935, he took up his position at Yale University, where he remained through the end of his career. He was first the Farnham Professor of Diplomatic History and then in 1945 became the Sterling Professor of Diplomatic History and Inter-American Relations. In 1958, he was elected a Fellow of the American Academy of Arts and Sciences. He retired in 1960, and served as president of the American Historical Association in 1961. His presidential address for the AHA engaged the topic of "American Foreign Policy and the Blessings of Liberty". He died in Bridgeport, Connecticut, aged 81.

He originally supported the League of Nations but after two decades changed his mind:

The League of Nations has been a disappointing failure. ... It has been a failure, not because the United States did not join it; but because the great powers have been unwilling to apply sanctions except where it suited their individual national interests to do so, and because Democracy, on which the original concepts of the League rested for support, has collapsed over half the world.

== Scholarly impact ==
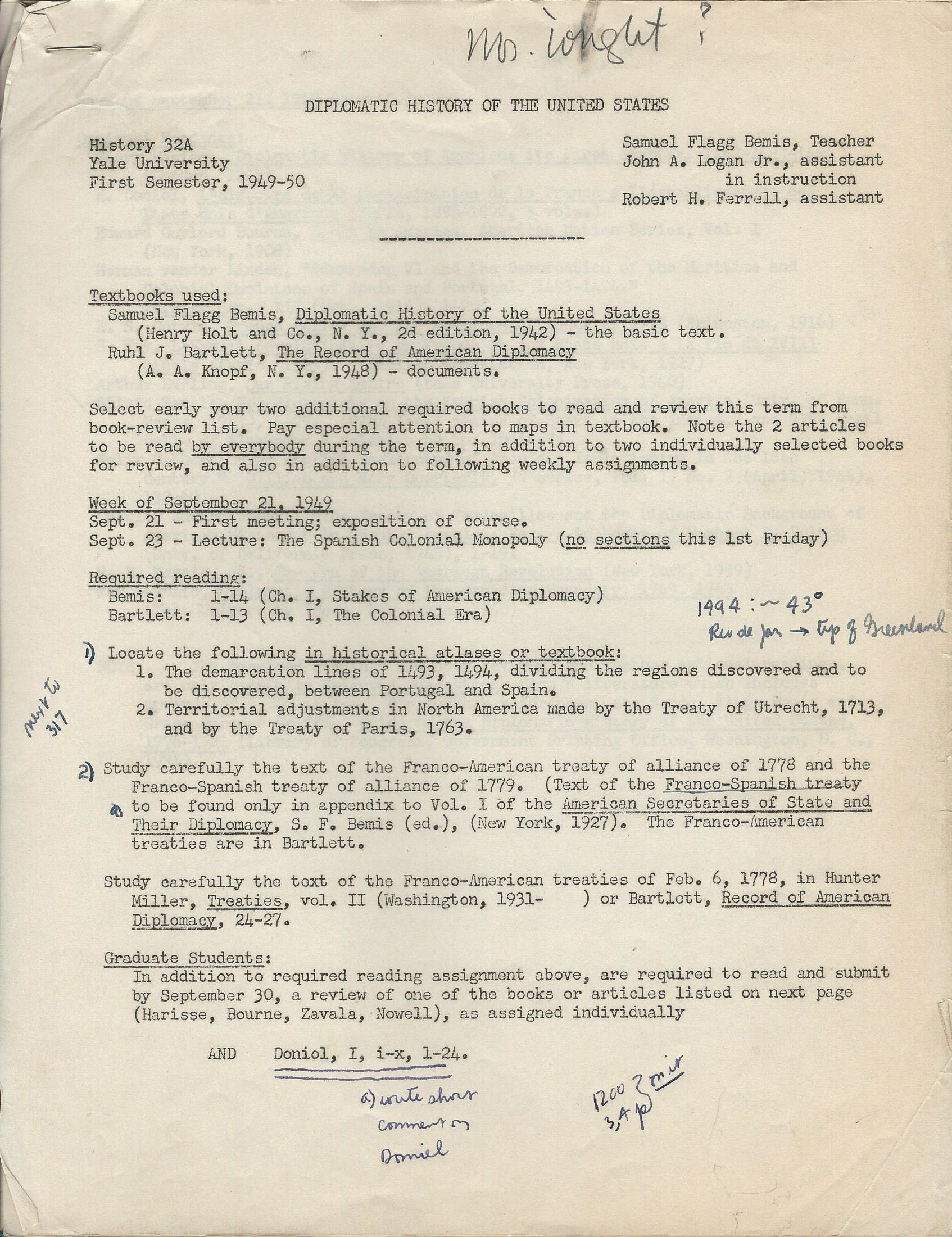
First page of the readings list for Bemis's diplomatic course at Yale, Fall 1949

Mark Gilderhus says Bemis was a "founding father" of the field of diplomatic history in the United States. His tone was nationalistic, typically blaming America's antagonists for conflicts, but he rose above jingoism and provided analysis which ran counter to State Department views. For Bemis, the great achievement US–Latin American relations was Franklin Roosevelt's Good Neighbor policy. He praised it for unifying the Pan American nations, along with the US leadership against Fascists and Nazis. During the Cold War, Bemis saw Latin America as a minor backwater of diplomacy.

Bemis was a strong writer, and his works attracted prizes for their quality. He also impressed upon his students the importance of good writing, a trend which they frequently passed down to their own students. He won the Pulitzer Prize twice. Bemis's books include Jay's Treaty: A Study in Commerce and Diplomacy (1924 and later reprint editions), which won the Knights of Columbus Historical Prize. His Pinckney's Treaty: America's Advantage from Europe's Distress, 1783–1800 (1926) was the published version of the Albert Shaw Lectures on Diplomatic History, and was the winner of the 1927 Pulitzer Prize for History. His other works include The Latin American Policy of the United States (1943) and The Diplomacy of the American Revolution (1935).

His single greatest scholarly achievement was his two-volume life of John Quincy Adams. John Quincy Adams and the Foundations of American Foreign Policy (1949) won the Pulitzer Prize for Biography or Autobiography in 1950; its sequel, John Quincy Adams and the Union (1956), covered Adams's life from his Presidency through his second political career as a member of the United States House of Representatives from Massachusetts. Bemis's favorable view of Adams is distilled in his observation that Adams grasped "the essentials of American policy and the position of the United States in the world."

His 18-volume series The American Secretaries of State and Their Diplomacy appeared first in ten volumes (published by Knopf in 1927–1929) covering Robert R. Livingston to Charles Evans Hughes. These were reprinted in 1958, and the success of the series prompted the creation of a further eight volumes, covering Frank B. Kellogg to Christian Herter, published through 1972. He also authored a well-known textbook on diplomatic history that first appeared in 1936 and went through four revisions.

== Awards and prizes ==
- Knights of Columbus Historical Prize
- 1926 Albert Shaw Lectures on Diplomatic History
- 1927 Pulitzer Prize for History
- 1950 Pulitzer Prize for Biography or Autobiography
- 1954 Guggenheim Fellowship for Creatives Arts-Biography
- 1958 Elected member of the American Academy of Arts and Sciences

== Bibliography ==
- Jay's Treaty: A Study in Commerce and Diplomacy (1923)
- Pinckney's Treaty: America's Advantage from Europe's Distress, 1783–1800 (1926)
- The American Secretaries of State and their Diplomacy (18 vols., 1927–1972)
- The Hussey-Cumberland Mission and American Independence (1931)
- The Diplomacy of the American Revolution. American Historical Association. 1935.
- Guide to the Diplomatic History of the United States, 1775–1921 (with Grace Gardner Griffin) (1935, reprinted 1951)
- A Diplomatic History of the United States (1936)
- The Rayneval Memoranda of 1782 on Western Boundaries and Some Comments on the French Historian Doniol (1937)
- Early Diplomatic Missions from Buenos Aires to the United States, 1811–1824 (1940)
- The Latin American Policy of the United States (1943)
- John Quincy Adams and the Foundations of American Foreign Policy (1949)
- John Quincy Adams and the Union (1956)
- "American Foreign Policy and the Blessings of Liberty", presidential address was delivered to the American Historical Association, December 29, 1961. American Historical Review 67#2 (January 1962): 291–305.
