= Conyers Read =

American historian (1881–1959)

- Born: April 25, 1881; Philadelphia, Pennsylvania, U.S.
- Died: December 24, 1959 (aged 78); Villanova, Pennsylvania, U.S.
- Education: Harvard University; Balliol College, Oxford
- Awards: Guggenheim Fellowship (1951, 1954)

Conyers Read (April 25, 1881 – December 24, 1959) was an American historian who specialized in the History of England in the 15th and 16th centuries. A professor of history at the universities of Chicago and Pennsylvania, he was president of the American Historical Association for the year 1949–1950.

In World War I Read served with the American Red Cross and in World War II he joined the Office of Strategic Services.

== Early life ==
The son of William Franklin Read, a textile manufacturer, by his marriage to Victoria Eliza Conyers, Read was the seventh in a family of eight children and was born at Philadelphia in 1881. He was educated there at the Central High School, from which he graduated in 1899, and then at Harvard, where he graduated AB summa cum laude in 1903. He next studied modern history at Balliol College, Oxford, where he graduated B.Litt, before returning to Harvard to take a Ph.D. in 1908.

== Career ==
Read's first academic post was as a lecturer at Harvard. After a year at Princeton (1909–1910), from 1910 to 1920 he taught at the University of Chicago as an associate professor, then as a professor, interrupted during World War I by service with the American Red Cross. In 1920 he returned to Philadelphia to join the family textile firm of William F. Read & Sons, in which he was general manager from 1927, then president from 1930 to 1933. Although no longer teaching at Chicago, he remained a non-resident professor of the university, and in 1932 he succeeded Dexter Perkins as executive secretary of the American Historical Association. In 1934 he returned to academia as a Professor of English History at the University of Pennsylvania.

Read's first major research project was his edition of the Bardon Papers, documents relating to the imprisonment and trial of Mary, Queen of Scots, published in London in the Camden Series in 1909. In 1925 he published the monumental Mr Secretary Walsingham and the Policy of Queen Elizabeth in three volumes, described in the American Historical Review as "the ripe fruition of upwards of two decades of exhaustive research".

Before the entry of the United States into World War II, Read chaired the Pennsylvania branch of the Committee to Defend America by Aiding the Allies. In 1941 he was employed by the Office of the Coordinator of Information, which meant spending the academic year 1941–1942 in Washington D.C. There he was lead officer of the British Empire section of the Office of Strategic Services research and analysis branch, predecessor of the CIA, for which task he was recruited by his fellow Harvard historian William L. Langer.

In 1949, at the time of the Cold War, Read was elected president of the American Historical Association, and his presidential address was widely reported. In it, he said the United States needed a militant attitude to survive and called for more discipline. He also sought to enlist historians in the fight against totalitarianism. In his call to action, he listed those to be resisted: "the Thomist, the Fascist, the Nazi, the Communist". He said:

Confronted by such alternatives as Mussolini and Hitler and last of all Stalin have imposed, we must clearly assume a militant attitude if we are to survive... Discipline is the essential prerequisite of every effective army, whether it marches under the Stars and Stripes or under the Hammer and Sickle... Total war, whether it be hot or cold, enlists everyone and calls upon everyone to assume his part. The historian is no freer from this obligation than the physicist... This sounds like the advocacy of one form of social control as against another. In short, it is... There is no menace to essential freedoms in this concept of control. Quite the contrary. It simply recognizes the fact that freedom can survive only if it goes hand in hand with a deep sense of social responsibility, particularly among those whose business is education in any form and at any level.

This address was later printed in the American Historical Review under the title 'Social responsibilities of the historian'. When the progressive Merle Curti became president of the association in 1954, he directly challenged the position taken up by Read and his successor Samuel Eliot Morison, in an address which George Rawick called "one of the most remarkable experiences of my life". In his autobiography, published after Read's death, Dexter Perkins said of Read that "he molded history to promote his convictions".

In 1950, Read commented on the fact that history was increasingly being written for small numbers of specialists and was ignored by most other academics, let alone the general reading public. He blamed "little pedants" who did not have "the courage to attempt history in the grand manner".

Read retired in 1951 and was awarded a Guggenheim Fellowship, which he held for two years. This was to support the writing of a new biography of William Cecil (1520–1598). The first volume of the work was published in 1955 as Mr Secretary Cecil and Queen Elizabeth and was awarded a Folger Shakespeare Library prize worth $1,000. The second volume was published posthumously in 1960 as Lord Burghley and Queen Elizabeth.

== Private life ==
In 1910 Read married as his first wife Edith C. Kirk, a daughter of Dr Edward C. Kirk, an academic of the University of Pennsylvania, and they had three children: Elizabeth (1912–1999), William F. Read III (1915–1996) and Edward C. K. Read (1918–1998). Read married secondly Evelyn Plummer (1901–1991). His postal address in 1948 was "Mt. Moro Rd., P.O. Box 593, Villanova, Pa." He died at home in Villanova on December 23, 1959.

== Honours ==
- Elected Member, American Philosophical Society, 1934
- Honorary Doctor of Letters, Ursinus College, 1938
- Elected Member, American Academy of Arts and Sciences, 1950
- Guggenheim Fellowship, 1951
- Honorary Doctor of Civil Laws, University of Pennsylvania, 1951
- Professor Emeritus of English History, University of Pennsylvania, 1952
- Honorary Doctor of Letters, Temple University, 1955

== Selected publications ==
- The Bardon Papers: Documents relating to the imprisonment and trial of Mary, Queen of Scots (London: Camden Society, 1909)
- 'Walsingham and Burghley in Queen Elizabeth's Privy Council' in The English Historical Review, vol. XXVIII (1913), pp. 34–58
- England and America (Chicago: University of Chicago Press, 1918)
- Mr Secretary Walsingham and the Policy of Queen Elizabeth (Oxford: Clarendon Press, 1925; Cambridge, Massachusetts: Harvard University Press, 1925), 3 vols.
- Bibliography of British History, Tudor Period, 1485–1603 (1933; second edition, Rowman and Littlefield, 1978)
- 'A Letter from Robert, Earl of Leicester, to a Lady', in The Huntington Library Bulletin No. 9 (April 1936)
- The Tudors: personalities and practical politics in sixteenth century England (New York: H. Holt and Company, 1936)
- The Constitution Reconsidered (New York: Columbia University Press, 1938)
- Social and Political Forces in the English Reformation (The Rockwell Lectures, Rice Institute) (Houston, Texas: Elsevier, 1953)
- Mr Secretary Cecil and Queen Elizabeth (London: Jonathan Cape, 1955)
- The Government of England under Elizabeth (Folger Booklets on Tudor and Stuart Civilization, 1959)
- Lord Burghley and Queen Elizabeth Published posthumously (London: Jonathan Cape, 1960)
