= Bibliography of the Burr conspiracy =

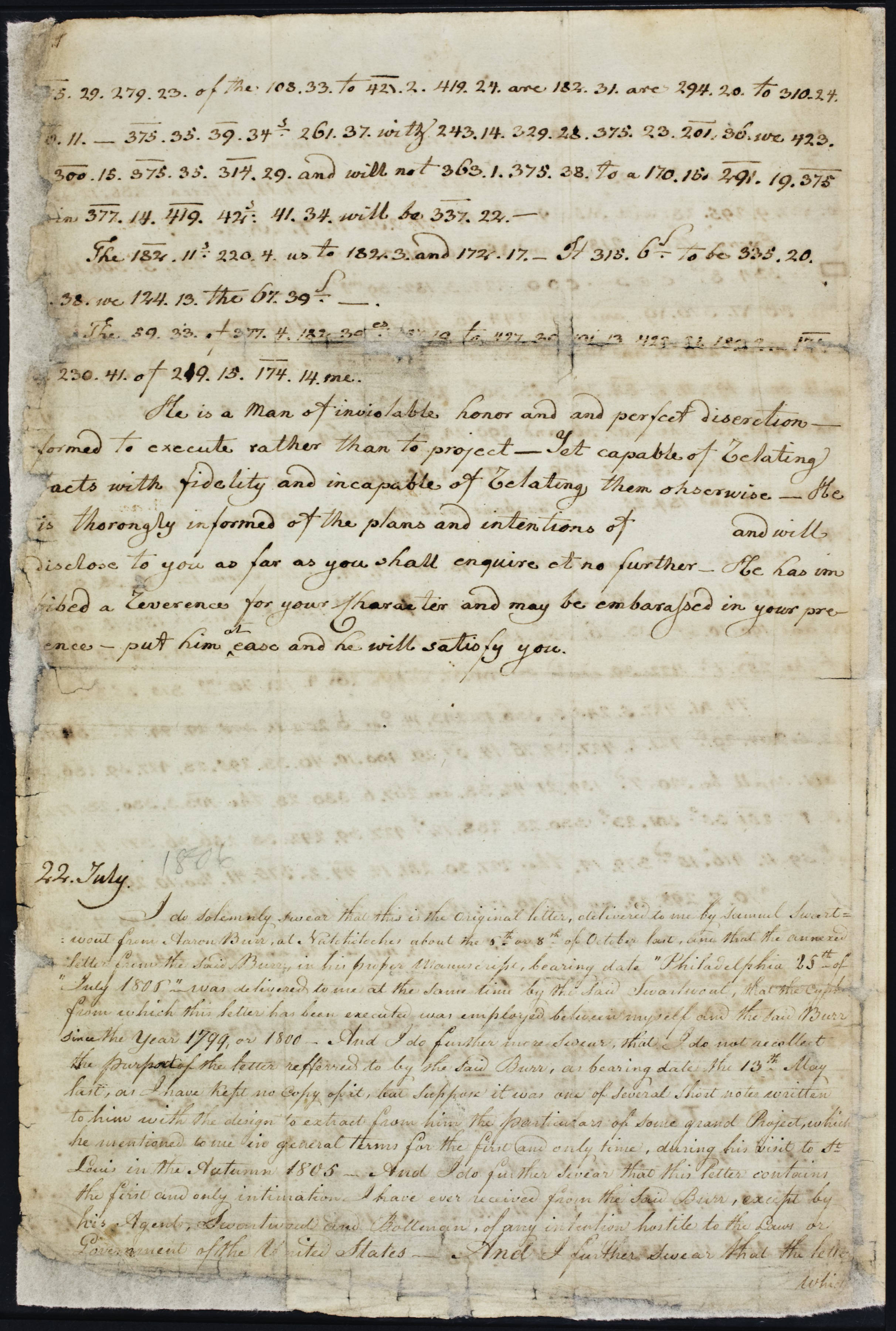
Aaron Burr letter to James Wilkinson, 1806 (Newberry Library object 16331)

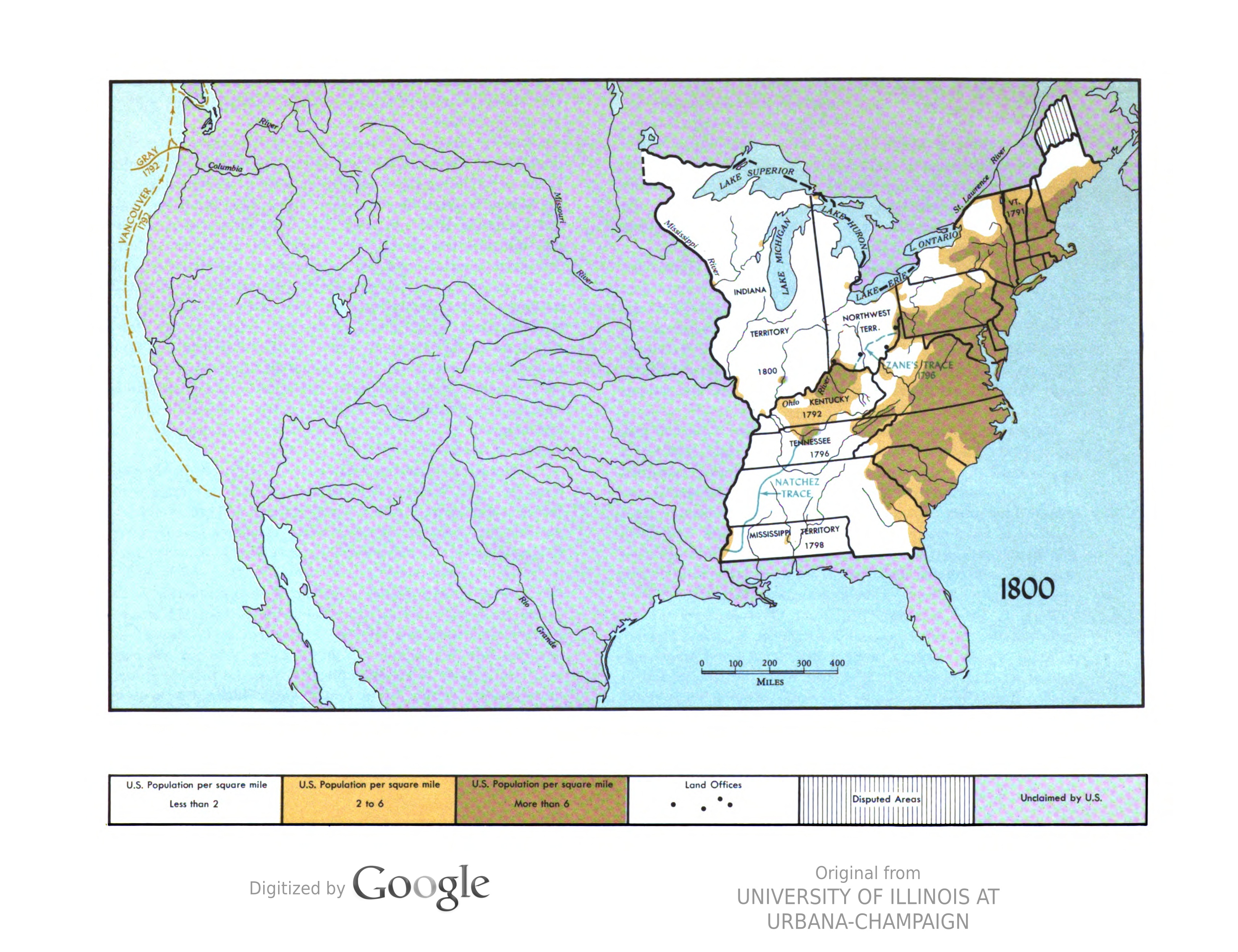
Map of the United States as of 1800

This is a bibliography of the Burr conspiracy and subsequent trials, during which former U.S. vice president Aaron Burr was accused of and tried for treason. The Burr conspiracy took place during the years 1805, 1806, and 1807, as part of the early history of the United States.

- Abernethy, Thomas Perkins (1949). "Aaron Burr in Mississippi". The Journal of Southern History. 15 (1): 9–21. doi:10.2307/2198070. ISSN 0022-4642. JSTOR 2198070.
- ——— (1954). The Burr Conspiracy. New York: Oxford University Press. LCCN 54006907. OCLC 710644.
- Adler, William D. (2021). Engineering Expansion: The U.S. Army and Economic Development, 1787–1860. American Governance: Politics, Policy, and Public Law. Philadelphia: University of Pennsylvania Press. ISBN 978-0-8122-5348-1.
- Bass, Feris Achile (August 1970). The Correspondence of Samuel Swartwout (Master's thesis). San Marcos, Texas: Southwest Texas State College.
- Berger, Raoul (1974). "Jefferson v. Marshall in the Burr Case". American Bar Association Journal. 60 (6): 702–706. ISSN 0002-7596. JSTOR 25726773.
- Bernsen, James Alan (2024). The Lost War for Texas: Mexican Rebels, American Burrites, and the Texas Revolution of 1811. College Station: Texas A&M University Press. ISBN 978-1-64843-173-9.
- Beirne, Francis F. (1959). Shout Treason: The Trial of Aaron Burr. New York: Hastings House. LCCN 59013552.
- Bradley, James W., ed. (2002). Interim Appointment: W. C. C. Claiborne Letter Book, 1804–1805. The Louisiana Purchase Collection. Louisiana State University Press. ISBN 978-0-8071-2684-4. LCCN 2001004234. OCLC 47746051.
- Burton, Harold H. (1951). ""Justice the Guardian of Liberty": John Marshall at the Trial of Aaron Burr". American Bar Association Journal. 37 (10): 735–788. ISSN 0002-7596. JSTOR 25717800.
- Caldwell, Norman W. (1951). "Fort Massac: Since 1805". Journal of the Illinois State Historical Society. 44 (1): 47–60. ISSN 0019-2287.
- Campbell, Richard (2015). ""Not Without His Enemies and Perhaps His Own Nemesis": Governor Joseph Alston and the War of 1812". The South Carolina Historical Magazine. 116 (1): 29–54. ISSN 0038-3082.
- ——— (2019). ""Let Me Always Be Judged by My Own Acts, and I Shall Be Satisfied": Joseph Alston and Burr's Conspiracy". The South Carolina Historical Magazine. 120 (2): 84–101. ISSN 0038-3082. JSTOR 45444939.
- Chidsey, Donald Barr (1967). The Great Conspiracy: Aaron Burr and his strange doings in the West. New York: Crown Publishers. LCCN 67027042.
- Cox, Isaac Joslin (1923). "The Louisiana-Texas Frontier During the Burr Conspiracy". The Mississippi Valley Historical Review. 10 (3): 274–284. doi:10.2307/1891602. ISSN 0161-391X. JSTOR 1891602.
- ——— (1929). "The Burr Conspiracy In Indiana". Indiana Magazine of History. 25 (4): 257–280. ISSN 0019-6673. JSTOR 27786407.
- ——— (1932). "Hispanic-American Phases of the "Burr Conspiracy"". The Hispanic American Historical Review. 12 (2): 145–175. doi:10.2307/2506736. ISSN 0018-2168. JSTOR 2506736.
- Cresap Society (1941). Some Ohio pioneers: Martin–Cresap descendants who helped make a typical American community. Allen County Public Library Genealogy Center. McComb, Mississippi: Cresap Society.
- Dargo, George (1975). Jefferson's Louisiana: Politics and the Clash of Legal Traditions. Studies in Legal History. Harvard University Press. doi:10.4159/harvard.9780674331174. ISBN 978-0-674-33116-7. LCCN 74025036. OCLC 1287643.
- Daveiss, J. H. (1917). Cox, Isaac Joslin; Swineford, Helen A. (eds.). "'View of the President's Conduct Concerning the Conspiracy of 1806' by J. H. Daveiss (Reprint)". Quarterly Publication of the Historical and Philosophical Society of Ohio. XII (2–3). Cincinnati: The Abingdon Press: 53–154. LCCN 07029223. OCLC 1779735.
- Everton, Muriel (May 1, 2010). Libel in Mississippi, 1798–1832 (Ph.D. thesis). 949 – via University of Southern Mississippi.
- Faber, Eberhard L. (2015). Building the Land of Dreams: New Orleans and the Transformation of Early America. Princeton University Press. doi:10.2307/j.ctt1wf4cjw. ISBN 978-1-4008-7352-4. LCCN 2015013605. OCLC 925478630.
- Fichtelberg, Joseph (2006). "The Devil Designs a Career: Aaron Burr and the Shaping of Enterprise". Early American Literature. 41 (3): 495–513. ISSN 0012-8163. JSTOR 25057466.
- Hardison, Brian D.; Swick, Ray (2009). "A Recruit for Aaron Burr: Lewis Wetzel and the Burr "Conspiracy"". West Virginia History. 3 (2): 75–86. ISSN 0043-325X. JSTOR 43265123.
- Harris, Matthew L.; Buckley, Jay H., eds. (2012). Zebulon Pike, Thomas Jefferson, and the opening of the American West. Norman: University of Oklahoma Press. ISBN 978-0-8061-4243-2.
- Hay, Thomas Robson (May 1935). "Some Reflections on the Career of General James Wilkinson". The Mississippi Valley Historical Review. 21 (4): 471–494. doi:10.2307/1895456. JSTOR 1895456.
- ——— (1936). "Charles Williamson and the Burr Conspiracy". The Journal of Southern History. 2 (2): 175–210. doi:10.2307/2191694. ISSN 0022-4642. JSTOR 2191694.
- Henry, Lemuel; Gaines, Edmund P.; Perkins, Nicholas; Mertes, John; McCormack, Sam'l; Henry, John Jay; Slade, H. B.; Dearborn, H.; Hay, G. W. (1896). "The Capture of Aaron Burr". The American Historical Magazine. 1 (2): 140–153. ISSN 2333-8970.
- Henshaw, Lesley, ed. (1914). "Burr-Blennerhassett Documents". Quarterly Publication of the Historical and Philosophical Society of Ohio. IX (1–2). Cincinnati: Press of Jennings and Graham: 7–68. LCCN 07029223. OCLC 1779735.
- Herschthal, Eric (2016). "Slaves, Spaniards, and Subversion in Early Louisiana: The Persistent Fears of Black Revolt and Spanish Collusion in Territorial Louisiana, 1803–1812". Journal of the Early Republic. 36 (2): 283–311. doi:10.1353/jer.2016.0036. ISSN 0275-1275.
- Hickey, Donald R. (Winter 1976). "Andrew Jackson and the Army Haircut: Individual Rights vs. Military Discipline". Tennessee Historical Quarterly. 35 (4): 365–375. ISSN 0040-3261.
- Hoffer, Peter Charles (2008). The Treason Trials of Aaron Burr. Landmark Law Cases & American Society. Lawrence, Kansas: University Press of Kansas. doi:10.1353/book.126943. ISBN 978-0-7006-1591-9. JSTOR jj.19023935. LCCN 2008007385. OCLC 199459113.
- Hudson, Angela Pulley (2010). Creek Paths and Federal Roads: Indians, Settlers, and Slaves and the Making of the American South. University of North Carolina Press. ISBN 9780807833933. JSTOR 10.5149/9780807898277_hudson. LCCN 2009049093. OCLC 658198573. Project MUSE book 18384.
- Jillson, Willard R. (1943). Henry Clay's Defense of Aaron Burr in 1806, an Episode of Early Western Adventure. Frankfort, Kentucky. OCLC 5169614.
- Kastor, Peter J. (October 2001). ""Motives of Peculiar Urgency": Local Diplomacy in Louisiana, 1803–1821". The William and Mary Quarterly. 58 (4): 819. doi:10.2307/2674501.
- Kennedy, Roger G. (2000). Burr, Hamilton, and Jefferson: A Study in Character. New York: Oxford University Press. doi:10.1093/acprof:oso/9780195140552.001.0001. ISBN 978-0-1998-4877-5. LCCN 99022453. OCLC 181840559.
- Lee, Kristin Condotta (2018). "Trading Spaces: Commerce, Ethnicity, and Early Irish New Orleans". Louisiana History: The Journal of the Louisiana Historical Association. 59 (3): 261–307. ISSN 0024-6816.
- Lee, Jacob F. (June 2023). ""Do You Go to New Orleans?": The Louisiana Purchase, Federalism, and the Contingencies of Empire in the Early U.S. Republic". Early American Studies. 21 (3): 460–490. doi:10.1353/eam.2023.a904223. ISSN 1559-0895.
- Lewis, James E. Jr. (2017). The Burr Conspiracy: Uncovering the Story of an Early American Crisis. Princeton, New Jersey: Princeton University Press. doi:10.2307/j.ctvc772g7. ISBN 978-0-691-17716-8. JSTOR j.ctvc772g7. LCCN 2017009890. OCLC 974567685. Project MUSE book 64669.
- McCaleb, Walter Flavius (1936). The Aaron Burr Conspiracy. New York: Wilson-Erickson. LCCN 38002747.
- Narrett, David E. (2012). "Geopolitics and Intrigue: James Wilkinson, the Spanish Borderlands, and Mexican Independence". The William and Mary Quarterly. 69 (1): 101–146. doi:10.5309/willmaryquar.69.1.0101. ISSN 0043-5597. JSTOR 10.5309/willmaryquar.69.1.0101.
- Newmyer, R. Kent (2012). The Treason Trial of Aaron Burr: Law, Politics, and the Character Wars of the New Nation. Cambridge Studies on the American Constitution. Cambridge University Press. ISBN 978-1-107-60661-6.
- Parton, James (1872). The life and times of Aaron Burr: lieutenant-colonel in the army of the revolution, United States Senator, Vice-President of the United States, etc. Boston: James R. Osgood.
- Pratt, Julius W. (October 1945). "Aaron Burr and the Historians". New York History. 26 (4). Fenimore Art Museum. Cornell University Press: 447–470. ISSN 0146-437X. JSTOR 23149934.
- Ranck, James B. (1930). "Andrew Jackson and the Burr Conspiracy". Tennessee Historical Magazine. 1 (1): 17–28. ISSN 2333-9012. JSTOR 42638050.
- Remini, Robert V. (1995). "Andrew Jackson Takes an Oath of Allegiance to Spain". Tennessee Historical Quarterly. 54 (1): 2–15. ISSN 0040-3261. JSTOR 42628387.
- Schneider, Norris F. (1966). Blennerhassett Island and the Burr Conspiracy. Ohio Historical Society (4th ed.). Columbus, Ohio.
- Sprague, Stuart Seely (1973). "The Louisville Canal: Key to Aaron Burr's Western Trip of 1805". The Register of the Kentucky Historical Society. 71 (1): 69–86. ISSN 0023-0243. JSTOR 23377346.
- Stewart, David O. (2011). American Emperor: Aaron Burr's Challenge to Jefferson's America. New York: Simon and Schuster. ISBN 978-1-4391-6032-9. LCCN 2011002647. OCLC 892924831.
- Tompkins, Hamilton Bullock (1892). Burr bibliography: a list of books relating to Aaron Burr. Publication No. 55. Brooklyn, N.Y.: Historical Printing Club.
- Trogdon, Jo Ann (2015). The Unknown Travels and Dubious Pursuits of William Clark. Columbia, Missouri: University of Missouri Press. ISBN 978-0-8262-2049-3.
- Vernet, Julien (2013). Strangers on Their Native Soil: Opposition to United States' Governance in Louisiana's Orleans Territory, 1803–1809. University Press of Mississippi. ISBN 978-1-61703-753-5. JSTOR j.ctt24hwc9.
- Wilkinson, James (1935). Wilkinson, Soldier and Pioneer. New Orleans: Rogers Printing Co. LCCN 44002879. OCLC 1855454.
- Wilson, Samuel L. (1936). "The Court Proceedings of 1806 in Kentucky against Aaron Burr and John Adair" (PDF). Filson Club Historical Quarterly. 10 (1): 31–40.
- Wood, John (1807). A full statement of the trial and acquittal of Aaron Burr, esq. : containing, all the proceedings and debates that took place before the federal court at Frankfort, Kentucky, November 25, 1806. University of Pittsburgh Library System. Alexandria: Printed by Cotton and Stewart.
- Wood, Marie Beyer (1951). None called him neighbor: The story of Harman Blennerhassett and the Aaron Burr conspiracy. Parkersburg (?), West Virginia. LCCN 52031386.
- Wright, Louis B.; Macleod, Julia H. (1945). "William Eaton's Relations with Aaron Burr". The Mississippi Valley Historical Review. 31 (4): 523–536. doi:10.2307/1895330. ISSN 0161-391X. JSTOR 1895330.
