= Kenneth S. Davis =

American historian and university professor

- Born: September 29, 1912; Salina, Kansas, U.S.
- Died: June 10, 1999 (aged 86); Madison, Wisconsin, U.S.
- Education: Kansas State University
- Occupations: Author, Journalist
- Writing career
- Genres: Biography, History
- Notable awards: Francis Parkman Prize

Kenneth Sydney Davis (September 29, 1912 – June 10, 1999) was an American historian and university professor, most renowned for his series of biographies of Franklin Delano Roosevelt. Davis also wrote biographies of Charles Lindbergh, Adlai Stevenson, and authored the first biography of General Dwight D. Eisenhower, entitled Dwight D. Eisenhower: Soldier of Democracy.

== Biography ==
Davis was born in Salina, Kansas, and raised in Manhattan, Kansas. He was a 1934 graduate of Kansas State University with a degree in journalism, and received a Master of Science degree from the University of Wisconsin–Madison in 1936. During his varied career, Davis was a journalism instructor at New York University, a war correspondent attached to General Eisenhower's headquarters during World War II, a member of the UNESCO Relations Staff of the State Department, and a professor of history at both Kansas State and the University of Kansas. He also worked as speech writer for presidential candidate Adlai Stevenson during the 1956 campaign.

== Awards ==
Davis was awarded the prestigious Francis Parkman Prize in 1973 for his book FDR: The Beckoning of Destiny, which was also a nominee for the National Book Award. In addition, his next two volumes on Roosevelt were both chosen as among the ten best books of the year by The New York Times. Davis was also a Guggenheim Fellow in 1974.

== Partial bibliography ==
- Dwight D. Eisenhower: Soldier of Democracy (ISBN 0-7567-6051-8, 2004) (reissue)
- FDR: The Beckoning of Destiny: 1882-1928 (ISBN 0-9650867-6-3, 2004) (Francis Parkman Prize Edition)
- FDR: The War President: 1940-1943 (ISBN 0-679-41542-4, 2000)
- FDR: New York Years: 1928-1933 (ISBN 0-394-51671-0, 1985)
- FDR: The New Deal Years: 1933-1937 (ISBN 0-394-52753-4, 1986)
- FDR: Into the Storm: 1937-1940 (ISBN 0-679-41541-6, 1993)
- Kansas: A Bicentennial History (ISBN 0-393-05593-0, 1976)
- Water (Series: LIFE Science Library) with Luna B. Leopold (1966)
- Experience of War: The United States in World War II (1965)
- The Hero: Charles A. Lindbergh (1959)
