= Adult Education Series =

Adult Education Series was the umbrella title for three different CBS Radio educational programs, all under the supervision of Sterling Fisher.

The first was Americans at Work, a 30-minute show heard on in the late evening on Thursdays, Saturdays and Tuesdays beginning April 28, 1938. By 1939, it was a successful component of the Thursday night CBS schedule with Brewster Morgan directing. The unscripted show used an interview format to cover diverse occupations, from working class individuals to such famed figures as Walt Disney. Many episodes were unscripted. It continued until April 23, 1940.

Living History, first broadcast May 4, 1938, was scheduled on Tuesday evenings. This 15-minute historical drama returned four years later for a run in the spring and summer of 1942 from March 3 until June 30.

Hosted by historian Allan Nevins, the 15-minute Adventures in Science covered a wide variety of medical and scientific topics. It was broadcast on several different days of the week from March 17, 1938, until August 18, 1957.
