= Felix Gilbert =

German-American historian (1905–1991)

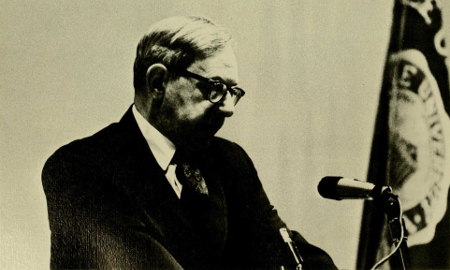
Felix Gilbert speaking at Temple University in 1968

Felix Gilbert (May 21, 1905 – February 14, 1991) was a German-born American historian of early modern and modern Europe. Gilbert was born in Baden-Baden, Germany, to a middle-class Jewish family, and part of the Mendelssohn Bartholdy clan. In the latter half of the 1920s, Gilbert studied under Friedrich Meinecke at the University of Berlin. Gilbert's area of expertise was the Renaissance, especially the diplomatic history of the period He was a fellow of the Institute for Advanced Study in Princeton from 1962 to 1975, and maintained an active involvement as an emeritus faculty member until his death in 1991. He was elected to the American Academy of Arts and Sciences in 1963 and the American Philosophical Society in 1969.

The main reading room of the German Historical Institute in Washington, D.C. is named in his honor.

== Work ==
- Johann Gustav Droysen und die preussisch-deutsche Frage, diss., Berlin 1931.
- Makers of Modern Strategy: Military Thought from Machiavelli to Hitler, (co-edited with Edward M. Earle and Gordon A. Craig) Princeton, N.J. 1943; New York 1966, 1971.
- "Bernardo Rucellai and the Orti Oricellari: A Study on the Origin of Modern Political Thought". In: Journal of the Warburg and Courtauld Institutes, Volume 12, 1949, p. 101–131.
- The Diplomats, 1919–1939, (co-edited with Gordon A. Craig), Princeton, N.J. 1954; New York 1963.
- To the Farewell Address: Ideas of Early American Foreign Policy, Princeton, N.J. 1961. (winner of the 1962 Bancroft Prize).
- Machiavelli and Guicciardini: Politics and History in Sixteenth-Century Florence, Princeton, N.J. 1965.
- Gilbert, Felix (1970). The End of the European Era: 1890 to the Present. London: Weidenfeld & Nicolson. 426 pages. ISBN 9780393054132. OCLC 423354102.
- History: Choice and Commitment, Cambridge, Massachusetts 1977.
- The Pope, His Banker, and Venice, Cambridge, Massachusetts 1981.
- A European Past: Memoirs, 1905-1945, 1988.
- History: Politics or Culture? Reflections on Ranke and Burckhardt, 1990.
