= Dexter Perkins =

American historian (1889–1984)

- Born: June 20, 1889; Boston, Massachusetts, U.S.
- Died: May 12, 1984 (aged 94)
- Education: Boston Latin School; Harvard University (AB, PhD)
- Occupation: Historian
- Children: Bradford

Dexter Perkins (June 20, 1889 – May 12, 1984) was an American historian who served as Professor and Chairman of the Department of American History at the University of Rochester, before leaving for Cornell.

== Biography ==
Born in Boston, and educated at Boston Latin School, Perkins received his A.B. (1909) and PhD (1914) from Harvard University, where he was admitted to Phi Beta Kappa. In his doctoral studies, Archibald Cary Coolidge was a formative influence.

Perkins's first job was at the University of Cincinnati, where he taught ancient history, British history, and international law in 1914–1915. The following year, he took a position at the University of Rochester.

Perkins was drafted in World War I, and entered service in June 1918. He joined the 87th Division, and shortly after it arrived in France he was commissioned as a first lieutenant and sent to Chaumont, where the American Expeditionary Force had its headquarters. Perkins was assigned to the historical section, where he found a former teacher of his from Harvard and others whom he had known from Harvard.

Upon his return to civilian life in July 1919, Perkins resumed his appointment at the University of Rochester, where he remained on the faculty until 1953. In 1925, he became chair of the history department. From 1928 to 1932, Perkins was secretary to the American Historical Association, succeeded by Conyers Read. In 1945, he was the first to hold Cambridge University’s Pitt Professor of American History and Institutions. Dr. Perkins was also the John L. Senior Professor of American Civilization at Cornell University from 1954 to 1959. He was a former visiting professor at the University of London and Cambridge University.

Perkins was the official US historian at the 1945 United Nations Conference on International Organization in San Francisco that preceded the organization of the United Nations. From 1950 to 1951, he served as the first president of the Salzburg Global Seminar, a non-profit organization based in Salzburg, Austria, whose mission is to challenge current and future leaders to develop creative ideas for solving global problems. As president of the American Historical Association in 1956, he delivered an address that emphasized the importance of teaching alongside scholarly research at universities. His son Bradford was a notable historian in his own right.

== Scholarly works ==
Perkins was the author of A History of the Monroe Doctrine, America and Two Wars, and The Evolution of American Foreign Policy. Perkins co-authored with Glyndon G. Van Deusen (also of the University of Rochester) The United States of America: A History. The two-volume work was published in 1962. He authored The Monroe Doctrine, 1826-1867.

- The American Approach to Foreign Policy (Harvard University Press, 1952)
- The New Age of Franklin Roosevelt, 1932–1945 (Chicago History of American Civilization, 1957)
- The American Way (Great Seal Press, 1957)

== Prizes and honors ==
- Phi Beta Kappa (1909)
- Inaugural Pitt Professor of American History and Institutions (1945)
- President, American Historical Association (1956)
