= Bradford Perkins (historian) =

American historian (1925–2008)

- Born: March 6, 1925; Rochester, New York, U.S.
- Died: June 29, 2008 (aged 83)
- Education: Harvard University (AB)
- Occupation: Historian
- Father: Dexter Perkins
- Awards: Bancroft Prize (1965)

Bradford Perkins (March 6, 1925 – June 29, 2008) was an American historian who spent the bulk of his career at the University of Michigan. He was the son of the historian Dexter Perkins.

== Life ==
Perkins was born in Rochester, New York, in 1925, where his father was a professor at the University of Rochester. He served in the U.S. Army during World War II in the European theater. He received his A.B. in 1947 from Harvard University, and completed his doctoral work there in 1952 under the direction of Frederick Merk.

Perkins taught at the University of California, Los Angeles. He joined the University of Michigan history department in 1962 and retired in 1997. He was professor emeritus at the University of Michigan. He was Commonwealth Fund Lecturer at University College London.

== Honors and awards ==
- 1962 Guggenheim Fellowship
- 1965 Bancroft Prize (for Castlereagh and Adams)
- 1974 President of the Society for Historians of American Foreign Relations
- 1979 delivered the Albert Shaw Lectures on Diplomatic History at Johns Hopkins University
- 1984-1994 member, Department of State Advisory Committee on Historical Diplomatic Documentation
- Elected to the Society of American Historians
- Elected Fellow of the Massachusetts Historical Society
- Elected to the American Antiquarian Society

== Works ==
- "Impressions of Wartime," The Journal of American History, September 1990
- "Interests, Values, and the Prism: The Sources of American Foreign Policy", Journal of the Early Republic, 1994
- The First Rapprochement: England and the United States, 1795-1805 (1955)
- Prologue to war, England and the United States, 1805-1812 (1961)full text online
- Castlereagh and Adams: England and the United States, 1812-1823 (1964)
- England and the United States (1967)
- The Great Rapprochement: England and the United States, 1895-1914 (1968, reprinted 2003)
- The Creation of a Republican Empire, 1776-1865 (Volume 1 of the Cambridge History of American Foreign Relations, ed. Warren I. Cohen)(1995)
