= Robert A. Divine =

Robert Alexander Divine (May 10, 1929 – October 14, 2021) was an American historian. He was the George W. Littlefield Professor of American History at the University of Texas at Austin in the United States. He retired in 1996.

== Writings ==
- The Illusion of Neutrality (1962)
- The Reluctant Belligerent: The American Entry into World War II (1965)
- In Blowing on the Wind: The Nuclear Test Ban Debate, 1954-1960 (1978)
- Eisenhower and the Cold War (1981)
- Perpetual War for Perpetual Peace (2000)
- The Sputnik Challenge: Eisenhower's Response to the Soviet Satellite
- Roosevelt and World War II
