= Payson J. Treat =

American Japanologist (1879–1972)

Professor Payson Jackson Treat
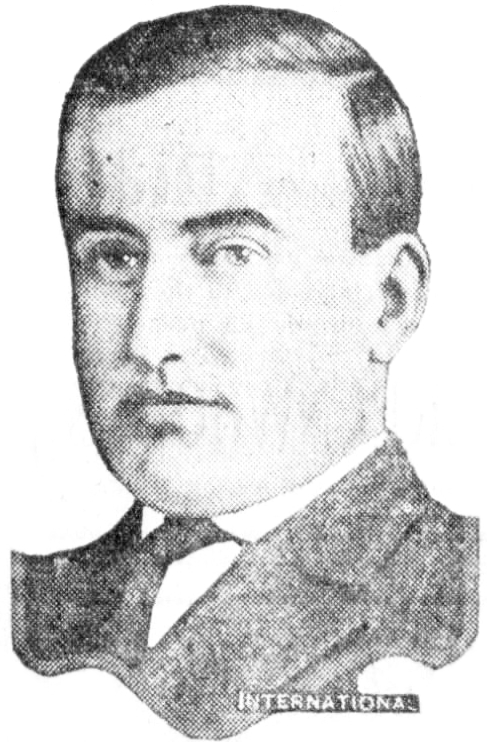
- Sketch of Payson J. Treat in 1921
- Born: November 12, 1879; New York City, United States
- Died: June 15, 1972 (aged 92); Stanford, California, United States

Academic background
- Education: Wesleyan University; Columbia University
- Doctoral advisor: Max Farrand

Academic work
- Discipline: History; Japanese studies
- Institutions: Stanford University
- Main interests: History of Japanese foreign relations

Payson Jackson Treat (November 12, 1879 – June 15, 1972) was an American Japanologist. He was born in New York City on November 12, 1879, and attended Wesleyan University as an undergraduate. He then attained a master's degree at Columbia. He started teaching at Stanford University in 1905, and was appointed a professor of history there in 1906—the first professorship in Far Eastern history at an American university. Treat received a doctorate at Stanford in 1910, working on the history of the American land system as a student of Max Farrand. In 1921, he was a visiting lecturer at the Imperial University of Tokyo and the University of Hong Kong. He retired in 1945 after teaching at Stanford for 40 years, but remained in Stanford, California, where he died on June 15, 1972. Until his death, Treat maintained an index card file relating the names and children of over 7,000 of his students.

== Selected works ==
- Treat, Payson J. (1910). The National Land System, 1785–1820. New York: E. B. Treat & Company.
- ——— (1917). The Early Diplomatic Relations between the United States and Japan, 1853–1865. Baltimore: The Johns Hopkins Press.
- ——— (1921). Japan and the United States, 1853–1921. Boston and New York: Houghton Mifflin Company.
- ——— (1928). The Far East: A Political and Diplomatic History. New York: Harper & Brothers.
- ——— (1932). Diplomatic Relations between the United States and Japan, 1853–1895. Stanford: Stanford University Press.
- ——— (1938). Diplomatic Relations between the United States and Japan, 1895–1905. Stanford: Stanford University Press.
