= Bernard Bellush =

American historian and journalist

Bernard Bellush (November 15, 1917 – December 20, 2011) was an American historian and journalist. He taught at the City College of New York.

== Biography ==
Bellush was born in the Bronx, New York City on November 15, 1917. He graduated from CCNY in 1941. He entered Columbia University in 1941 for graduate training in history. He completed a master's degree with a thesis on Eugene V. Debs, and two days after submission in November 1942 he was inducted into the United States Army. During the war he served with the 616th Ordnance Ammunition Company, and as part of the 5th Engineer Special Brigade he landed on Omaha Beach on D-Day, June 6, 1944. Returning to the United States and demobilized after the war, he attended Columbia University's doctoral program in history and received his Ph.D. in 1951 under the direction of Allan Nevins.

He subsequently taught at his alma mater, the City College of New York, for the remainder of his academic career.

== Scholarly impact ==
Bellush's work is remembered through several memorial awards. The City College of New York History Department awards undergraduates the Bellush Service Award to a student for social service as well as scholarship. In commemoration of Bellush's influence on the field of labor history, the New York Labor History Association established the Bernard Bellush Prize in his honor to be given for a student research paper in the field of labor and work history.

== Bibliography ==
- Franklin D. Roosevelt as Governor of New York (1955)
- He Walked Alone: A Biography of John G. Winant (1968)
- The Failure of the N.R.A. (1975)
- Union Power and New York: Victor Gotbaum and District Council 37 (with Jewel Bellush) (1984)
