= Brian Balogh =

American historian

Academic background
- Education: Harvard University, Johns Hopkins University

Academic work
- Discipline: History
- Institutions: University of Virginia

Brian Balogh is an American historian, author and emeritus professor at the University of Virginia. Balogh was the director of the National Fellowship Program hosted by the Jefferson Scholars Foundation. He also co-hosted the radio program, "Backstory with the American History Guys". In 2015, he received a Nancy Lyman Roelker Mentorship Award.

== Education ==
Balogh graduated from Harvard University, and from Johns Hopkins University.

== Works ==
- Chain Reaction: Expert Debate and Public Participation in American Commercial Nuclear Power 1945-1975. Cambridge University Press. 1991. ISBN 978-0-521-37296-1.
- B. Balogh, ed. (1996). Integrating the Sixties: The Origins, Structures, and Legitimacy of Public Policy in a Turbulent Decade. Issues in Policy History Series. Pennsylvania State University Press. ISBN 978-0-271-04465-1.
- A Government Out of Sight: The Mystery of National Authority in Nineteenth-Century America. Cambridge University Press. 2009. ISBN 978-1-139-47814-4.
- B. Balogh; B.J. Schulman, eds. (2015). Recapturing the Oval Office: New Historical Approaches to the American Presidency. Miller Center of Public Affairs Books. Cornell University Press. ISBN 978-1-5017-0087-3.
- The Associational State: American Governance in the Twentieth Century. Book collections on Project MUSE. University of Pennsylvania Press, Incorporated. 2015. ISBN 978-0-8122-4721-3.(2015)
- Not in My Backyard: How Citizen Activists Nationalized Local Politics in the Fight to Save Green Springs. Yale University Press. 2024. ISBN 978-0-300-253788.
