= Francis Loewenheim =

American historian

Francis L. Loewenheim (June 27, 1927 – October 17, 1996) was an American historian at Rice University. He was one of the leading authorities on modern diplomatic history.

Born in Nuremberg, Germany, Loewenheim came to the United States with his parents in 1934, one year after the Machtergreifung. He grew up in Cincinnati, Ohio, and received bachelor's and master's degrees in history from the University of Cincinnati and his doctorate in 1952 from Columbia University.

Loewenheim joined Rice University faculty in 1959 after working in the Historical Division of the Department of State in 1958 and 1959. Earlier he taught at Princeton University and elsewhere, and he had a special interest in Germany. He stopped teaching after two heart attacks in 1991, but he kept on doing research and some writing.
