= List of online encyclopedias of U.S. states =

Online encyclopedias and related reference works concerning U.S. states, listed below, include resources sponsored by historical societies, humanities councils, libraries, universities, and other organizations. Most are freely accessible online, while some are available as cached versions or require a paid subscription.

== List ==
State	Name	Access	Sponsored by
Alabama	Encyclopedia of Alabama	Freely accessible	Alabama Humanities Foundation
Arkansas	Encyclopedia of Arkansas	Freely accessible	Central Arkansas Library System
Colorado	Colorado Encyclopedia	Freely accessible	History Colorado
Connecticut	Encyclopedia of Connecticut Biography (10 vols., 1917–23)	Freely accessible	
Florida	Floripedia: A Florida Encyclopedia (a collection of links to original sources, not an encyclopedia)	Freely accessible	Florida Center for Instructional Technology, University of South Florida
Georgia	New Georgia Encyclopedia	Freely accessible	Georgia Humanities and the University of Georgia Press
Illinois	Encyclopedia of Chicago	Freely accessible	Chicago History Museum
Indiana	Encyclopedia of Indianapolis	Freely accessible	Indianapolis Public Library
Kansas	Kansapedia (not to be confused with KansasPedia.com)	Freely accessible	Kansas Historical Society (a state agency)
Kentucky	The Kentucky Encyclopedia, cached	Freely accessible	University Press of Kentucky
Kentucky	Encyclopedia of Louisville	Freely accessible	University Press of Kentucky
Louisiana	64 Parishes (formerly Know Louisiana)	Freely accessible	Louisiana Endowment for the Humanities
Maine	Maine: An Encyclopedia (cached)	Freely accessible	Publius Research
Massachusetts	Encyclopedia of Massachusetts, biographical—genealogical (1916)	Freely accessible	
Minnesota	MNopedia	Freely accessible	Minnesota Historical Society
Mississippi	Mississippi Encyclopedia	Freely accessible	Mississippi Humanities Council
Missouri	Missouri Encyclopedia	Freely accessible	State Historical Society of Missouri
Nevada	Online Nevada Encyclopedia	Freely accessible	Nevada Humanities
New York	Encyclopedia of New York State	Requires paid subscription	Available through Gale.
North Carolina	NCPedia	Freely accessible	State Library of North Carolina
Ohio	Ohio History Central (archived location)	Freely accessible	Ohio History Connection
Oklahoma	The Encyclopedia of Oklahoma History and Culture	Freely accessible	Oklahoma Historical Society
Oregon	The Oregon Encyclopedia	Freely accessible	Portland State University and the Oregon Historical Society
Pennsylvania	Encyclopedia of Greater Philadelphia	Freely accessible	Mid-Atlantic Regional Center for the Humanities
South Carolina	South Carolina Encyclopedia	Freely accessible	"A joint project of South Carolina Humanities, the University of South Carolina Press, the USC Libraries, the USC Center for Digital Humanities, the USC College of Arts & Sciences, the USC Institute for Southern Studies, the South Carolina State Library, and many other organizations."
Tennessee	Tennessee Encyclopedia	Freely accessible	Tennessee Historical Society – University of Tennessee Press
Texas	Handbook of Texas	Freely accessible	Texas State Historical Association
Virginia	Encyclopedia Virginia	Freely accessible	Virginia Foundation for the Humanities and Library of Virginia (formerly the Virginia State Library)
Virginia	Encyclopedia of Virginia Biography (1915)	Freely accessible	Arranged by time period and office held, not alphabetically.
Washington	HistoryLink	Freely accessible	HistoryLink, 4Culture, King County, Washington, Seattle Office of Arts & Culture, The Norcliffe Foundation
West Virginia	e-WV, the West Virginia Encyclopedia	Freely accessible	West Virginia Humanities Council
Wyoming	Encyclopedia of Wyoming	Freely accessible	Wyoming State Historical Society

== See also ==
- List of online encyclopedias
