= A History of Soviet Russia =

Historical work by E. H. Carr covering the Soviet Union from 1917–1929

- Title page for A History of Soviet Russia The Bolshevik Revolution, 1917-1923, Volume I (1951)
- Author: E. H. Carr
- Language: English
- Subject: History of the Soviet Union
- Publisher: Macmillan Press
- Publication date: 1950-1978
- Publication place: England
- Media type: Print

A History of Soviet Russia is a 14-volume work by E. H. Carr, covering the first twelve years of the history of the Soviet Union. It was first published from 1950 onward and re-issued from 1978 onward.

- The Bolshevik Revolution, 1917-1923, Volume 1. (1950)
- The Bolshevik Revolution, 1917-1923, Volume 2. (1952)
- The Bolshevik Revolution, 1917-1923. Volume 3. (1953)
- The Interregnum, 1923-1924. (1954)
- Socialism in One Country, 1924-1926, Volume 1. (1958)
- Socialism in One Country, 1924-1926, Volume 2. (1959)
- Socialism in One Country, 1924-1926, Volume 3, Part 1. (1964)
- Socialism in One Country, 1924-1926, Volume 3, Part 2. (1964)
- Foundations of a Planned Economy, 1926-1929, Volume 1, Part 1. (1969)
- Foundations of a Planned Economy, 1926-1929, Volume 1, Part 2. (1969)
- Foundations of a Planned Economy, 1926-1929, Volume 2. (1971)
- Foundations of a Planned Economy, 1926-1929, Volume 3, Part 1. (1976)
- Foundations of a Planned Economy, 1926-1929, Volume 3, Part 2. (1976)
- Foundations of a Planned Economy, 1926-1929, Volume 3, Part 3. (1978)

Carr subsequently distilled the research contained in these fourteen volumes into a short book titled The Russian Revolution: from Lenin to Stalin, 1917-1929 which covers the same period as the large history.

== Reception ==
The History of Soviet Russia volumes was met with a positive reception by historians and a generally negative one by Cold War Kremlinologists. In 1970, the Encyclopædia Britannica described the History of Soviet Russia series as simply "magisterial". British historian Chimen Abramsky praised Carr as the world's foremost historian of the Soviet Union who displayed an astonishing knowledge of the subject. The Canadian historian John Keep called the series "[a] towering scholarly monument; in its shadow the rest of us are but pygmies". Isaac Deutscher called A History of Soviet Russia "a truly outstanding achievement". A. J. P. Taylor called A History of Soviet Russia the most fair and best series of books ever written on Soviet history. Taylor was later to call Carr "an Olympian among historians, a Goethe in range and spirit". American journalist Harrison Salisbury called Carr "one of the half dozen greatest specialists in Soviet affairs and in Soviet-German relations". British academic Michael Cox praised the History of Soviet Russia series as "an amazing construction: almost pyramid-like [...] in its architectural audacity" British historian John Barber argued that History of Soviet Russia series through a scrupulous and detailed survey of the evidence "transformed" the study of Soviet history in the West. British historian Hugh Seton-Watson called Carr "an object of admiration and gratitude" for his work in Soviet studies. The British Marxist historian Hillel Ticktin praised Carr as an honest historian of the Soviet Union and accused critics like Norman Stone, Richard Pipes and Leopold Labedz as "Cold Warriors" who were "not unconnected with serving the needs of official British and American foreign policy".

In 1983, four American historians—namely Geoff Eley, W. Rosenberg, Moshe Lewin and Ronald Suny—wrote in a joint article in the London Review of Books of the "grandeur" of Carr's work and his "extraordinary pioneering quality". They claimed that the scope of Carr's history was such that he "went where no one had gone before and where only a few have really gone since", thus providing "an agenda of questions which will be pursued for the rest of the 20th century". British historian Jonathan Haslam called Carr a victim of British "McCarthyism" who was unjustly punished for his willingness to defend and praise the Soviet Union. Eric Hobsbawm wrote that Carr's History of Soviet Russia "constitutes, with Joseph Needham's Science and Civilisation in China, the most remarkable effort of single-handed historical scholarship undertaken in Britain within living memory". American historian Peter Wiles called the History of Soviet Russia "one of the great historiographical enterprises of our day" and wrote of Carr's "immensely impressive" work American historian Arno J. Mayer wrote that "the History of Soviet Russia [...] established E.H. Carr not only as the towering giant among Western specialists of recent Russian history, but certainly also as the leading British historian of his generation".

Unusually for a book by a Western historian, A History of Soviet Russia met with warily favourable reviews by Soviet historians. Normally, any works by Western historians met with hostile reviews in the Soviet Union, and there was even a brand of polemical literature by Soviet historians attacking "bourgeois historians", on the grounds that only Soviet historians were fully capable of understanding the Soviet project and its context. Despite this, the History of Soviet Russia series were not translated into Russian and published in the Soviet Union until 1990. A Soviet journal commented in 1991 that Carr was "almost unknown to a broad Soviet readership", although all Soviet historians were aware of his work and most of them had considerable respect for Carr, but they had been unable to say so until Perestroika. Those Soviet historians who specialised in rebutting the "bourgeois falsifiers"—as Western historians were so labelled in the Soviet Union—attacked Carr for writing that Soviet countryside was in chaos after 1917, but they praised him as one of the "few bourgeois authors" who told the "truth" about Soviet economic achievements. Until the glasnost period, Carr was considered a "bourgeois falsifier" in the Soviet Union, but he was praised as a British historian who had taken "certain steps" towards Marxism-Leninism and whose History of Soviet Russia was described as "fairly objective" and "one of the most fundamental works in bourgeois Sovietology".

In a preface to the Soviet edition of The History of Soviet Russia in 1990, the Soviet historian Albert Nenarokov wrote that in his lifetime Carr had "automatically been ranked with the falsifiers", but in fact The History of Soviet Russia was a "scrupulous, professionally conscientious work". Nenarokov called Carr an "honest, objective scholar, espousing liberal principles and attempting on the basis of an enormous documentary base to create a satisfactory picture of the epoch he was considering and those involved in it, to assist a sober and realistic perception of the USSR and a better understanding of the great social processes of the twentieth century". However, Nenarokov expressed some concern about Carr's use of Stalinist language such as calling Nikolai Bukharin part of the "right deviation" in the Bolshevik Party without the use of the quotation marks. Nenarokov took the view that Carr had too narrowly reduced Soviet history after 1924 down to a choice of either Joseph Stalin or Leon Trotsky, arguing that Bukharin was a better, more humane alternative to both Stalin and Trotsky.

The pro-Soviet slant in Carr's The History of Soviet Russia attracted some controversy. In a 1955 review in Commentary, Bertram Wolfe accused Carr of systemically taking on Vladimir Lenin's point of view in History of Soviet Russia volumes and of being unwilling to consider other perspectives on Russian history. In 1962, British historian Hugh Trevor-Roper argued that Carr's identification with the "victors" of history meant that Carr saw Stalin as historically important and that he had neither time nor sympathy for the millions of Stalin's victims. Anglo-American historian Robert Conquest argued that Carr took the official reasons for the launching of the first five-year plan too seriously. Furthermore, Conquest maintained that Carr's opponents such as Leonard Schapiro, Adam Ulam, Bertram Wolfe and Robert C. Tucker had a far better understanding of Soviet history than did Carr. Pipes wrote that the essential questions of Soviet history were "Who were the Bolsheviks, what did they want, why did some follow them and others resist? What was the intellectual and moral atmosphere in which all these events occurred?" and went on to note that Carr failed to pose these questions, let alone answer them. Pipes later compared Carr's single paragraph dismissal in the History of Soviet Russia of the 1921 famine as unimportant with Holocaust denial.

Polish Kremlinologist Leopold Labedz criticised Carr for taking the claims of the Soviet government too seriously. Labedz went on to argue that Carr's decision to end the History of Soviet Russia series at 1929 reflected an inability and unwillingness to criticize Stalin's Soviet Union. Labedz was very critical of Carr's handling of sources, arguing that Carr was too inclined to accept official Soviet documents at face value and unwilling to admit to systematic falsification of the historical record under Stalin. Finally, Labedz took Carr to task over what he regarded as Carr's tendency to whitewash Soviet crimes "behind an abstract formula which often combines "progressive" stereotypes with the lexicon of Soviet terminology". Norman Stone argued that Carr was guilty of writing in a bland style meant to hide his pro-Soviet sympathies. Walter Laqueur argued that the History of Soviet Russia volumes were a dubious historical source that for the most part excluded the unpleasant aspects of Soviet life, reflecting Carr's pro-Soviet tendencies. A major source of criticism of a History of Soviet Russia was Carr's decision to ignore the Russian Civil War under the grounds it was unimportant and likewise to his devoting only a few lines to the Kronstadt mutiny of 1921 since Carr considered it only a minor event. Laqueur commented that Carr's ignoring the Russian Civil War while paying an inordinate amount of attention to such subjects as the relations between the Bolshevik and Swedish Communist parties and Soviet diplomatic relations with Outer Mongolia in the 1920s left the History of Soviet Russia very unbalanced.
