= Tamara Deutscher =

Polish-British writer and editor

- Born: Tamara Lebenhaft; 1 February 1913; Łódź, Piotrków Governorate, Congress Poland
- Died: 7 August 1990 (aged 77); Camden Town, London, England
- Era: 20th century
- Employer: Polish government-in-exile
- Movement: Trotskyism
- Spouse: Isaac Deutscher

Tamara Deutscher (1 February 1913 – 7 August 1990) was a Polish-English writer and editor who fled from France in World War II and settled in London. She researched the leaders of Soviet Communism, together with her husband Isaac Deutscher. She also contributed articles to the New Left Review, wrote a book about Vladimir Lenin and collaborated with other left wing authors.

== Biography ==
Deutscher was born Tamara Lebenhaft in Łódź, in what was then Congress Poland. She was educated in Brussels and fled to Britain after the fall of France to Nazi Germany in World War II, escaping on one of the last ships to leave the south of France for Liverpool.

In London, she was employed as secretary for an expatriate Polish journalists organisation.

Her first marriage to Hilary Frimer ended in divorce. She married Isaac Deutscher in June 1947, who both described themselves "non-Jewish Jews." She and Deutscher collaborated on biographies of Leon Trotsky and Joseph Stalin. She edited collections of her husband's work following his death in 1967.

Deutscher's anthology on Vladimir Lenin, Not By Politics Alone: The Other Lenin, was published in 1973 and was reissued by Verso Books in 2024. Deutscher also collaborated with E. H. Carr in his final volumes on Soviet history, wrote about Rosa Luxemburg, and contributed the preface for David King's portfolio, Trotsky. She contributed fifteen essays to the New Left Review between 1968 and 1987, including writing about visits to China and Ceylon and two articles about Poland.

Just a few days before she died Deutscher participated in a television show marking the fiftieth anniversary of Trotsky's death. She died on 7 August 1990 in Camden, London, aged 77.

The Isaac and Tamara Deutscher Memorial Prize is given annually for a new book published in English "which exemplifies the best and most innovative new writing in or about the Marxist tradition." Winners have included Roland Boer and Kohei Saito.

== Select publications ==
- Not By Politics Alone: The Other Lenin, 1973. Reissued in 2024 by Verso Books.
- E.H. Carr: A Personal Memoir, New Left Review, No. 137, January–February 1983, pp. 78–86.
