= Renz =

Renz is a German-language surname.

== People ==
- Andreas Renz (born 1977), German ice hockey player
- Bettina Renz, German political scientist
- Ernst Renz (1815–1892), German circus proprietor
- Martina Ertl-Renz (born 1973), German alpine skier
- Sigi Renz (1938–2025), German racing cyclist
- Thomas Maria Renz (born 1957), German theologian
- Torsten Renz (born 1964), German politician

== See also ==
- Circus Renz, historical circus in Germany
- Circus Herman Renz, the largest circus of the Netherlands
