= Arno J. Mayer =

American historian (1926–2023)

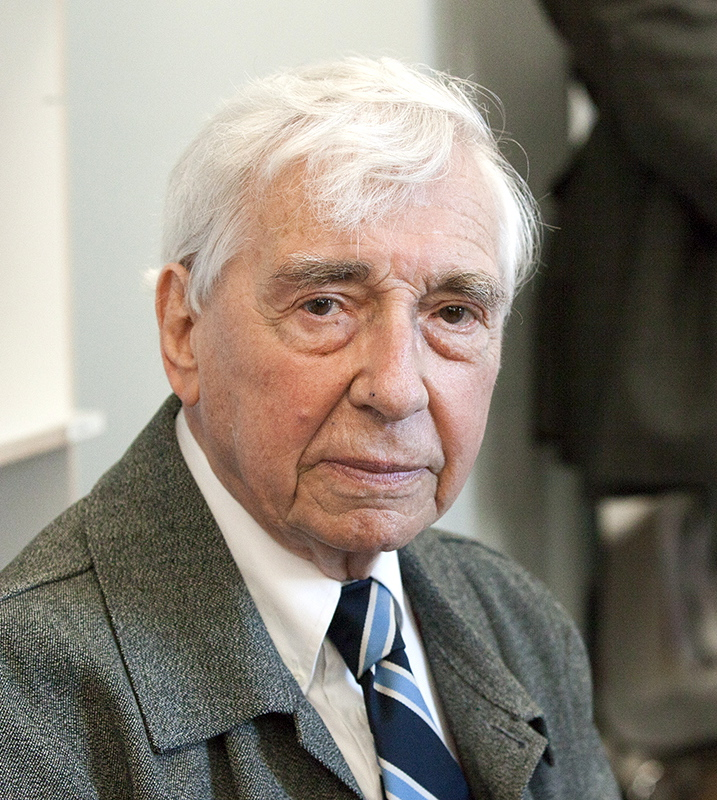
- Mayer at a 2013 IEIS Conference
- Born: June 19, 1926; Luxembourg City, Luxembourg
- Died: December 18, 2023 (aged 97); Princeton, New Jersey, U.S.
- Children: 2

Academic background
- Education: Yale University; Graduate Institute of International Studies; City College of New York
- Influences: Karl Marx

Academic work
- Discipline: Diplomatic history European history Modernization theory
- Institutions: Princeton University; Harvard University; Brandeis University; Wesleyan University
- Notable students: Corey Robin
- Influenced: Gabriel Kolko

Arno Joseph Mayer (June 19, 1926 – December 18, 2023) was a Luxembourgish-born American historian who specialized in modern Europe, diplomatic history, and the Holocaust. He was the Dayton-Stockton Professor of History at Princeton University.

== Early life and academic career ==
Mayer was born into a middle-class family in Luxembourg City on June 19, 1926. His father was a wholesaler who had studied at the University of Heidelberg and had strong social democratic and Zionist beliefs. Mayer described his family as "fully emancipated and largely acculturated Luxembourgian Jews".

The Mayer family fled into France amid the German invasion on 10 May 1940 and reached the France–Spain border by Autumn 1940 but were turned back by Spanish border guards and were in the Vichy-controlled "Free Zone" after the Fall of France. The family succeeded in boarding a ship to Oran in French Algeria on 18 October 1940 but were prevented from entering Morocco because they lacked a visa and were house arrested for several weeks in Oudja. They secured visas for the United States on 22 November 1940 and arrived in New York during January 1941. His maternal grandparents, who had refused to leave Luxembourg, were deported to the Theresienstadt Ghetto where his grandfather died in December 1943.

Mayer became a naturalized citizen of the United States in 1944 and enlisted in the United States Army. During his time in the Army, he was trained at Camp Ritchie, Maryland and was recognized as one of the Ritchie Boys. He served as an intelligence officer and eventually became a morale officer for high-ranking German prisoners of war. He was discharged in 1946 and attended the City College of New York, the Graduate Institute of International Studies in Geneva and Yale University. Mayer received his Ph.D. in 1954 from Yale. His dissertation, “The Politics of Allied War Aims,” was written under the supervision of Hajo Holborn, the eminent historian.

He was professor at Wesleyan University (1952–53), Brandeis University (1954–58) and Harvard University (1958–61). He taught at Princeton University beginning in 1961.

== Views ==
A self-proclaimed "left dissident Marxist", Mayer's major interests were in modernization theory and what he termed "The Thirty Years' Crisis" between 1914 and 1945. Mayer posited that Europe was characterized during the 19th century by a rapid economic modernization by industrialization and retardation of political change. He argued that what he referred to as "The Thirty Years’ Crisis" was caused by the problems of a dynamic new society produced by industrialization coexisting with a rigid political order. He felt that the aristocracy of all of the European countries had too much power, and it was their efforts to keep power that resulted in World War I, the development of fascism, World War II, and the Holocaust.

In a 1967 essay "The Primacy of Domestic Politics", Mayer made a Primat der Innenpolitik ("primacy of domestic politics") argument for the origins of World War I. He rejected the traditional Primat der Außenpolitik ("primacy of foreign politics") argument of traditional diplomatic history on the grounds that it failed to take into account that, in Mayer's opinion, all the major European countries were in a "revolutionary situation" during 1914, and thus ignored what he considered to be the crucial effect that domestic politics had on foreign-policy making elites. In Mayer's opinion, during 1914, the United Kingdom of Great Britain and Ireland was on the verge of civil war and massive industrial unrest, Italy had been experiencing the Red Week of June 1914, the French Left and Right were almost warring with each other, Germany suffered from ever-increasing political strife, Russia was close to suffering a huge strike, and Austria-Hungary was confronted with increasing ethnic and class tensions. Mayer insisted that liberalism and centrist ideologies in general were disintegrating due to the challenge from the extreme right in the UK, France and Italy while being a non-existent force in Germany, Austria-Hungary and Russia. Mayer ended his essay by arguing that World War I should be best understood as a pre-emptive "counterrevolutionary" strike by ruling elites in Europe to preserve their power by distracting public attention to foreign affairs.

Mayer argued in his Politics and Diplomacy of Peacemaking (1967), which won the American Historical Association's 1968 Herbert Baxter Adams Prize, that the Paris Peace Conference was a struggle between what he termed the "Old Diplomacy" of the alliance system, secret treaties and brutal power politics and the "New Diplomacy" as represented by Vladimir Lenin's Decree on Peace of 1917 and Woodrow Wilson's Fourteen Points, which Mayer considered as promoting peaceful and rational diplomacy. He described the world of 1919 as divided between the "forces of movement", representing liberal and left-wing forces, representing the "New Diplomacy" and the "forces of order", representing conservative and reactionary forces, representing the "Old Diplomacy". Mayer considered all foreign policy as basically a projection of domestic politics, and much of his writing on international relations is devoted towards explaining just what domestic lobby was exerting the most influence on foreign policy at that particular time. In Mayer's opinion, the "New Diplomacy", associated with Lenin and Wilson, was associated also with Russia and America, both societies that Mayer argued either had destroyed or lacked the partial "modernized" societies that characterized the rest of Europe. He saw the United States' diplomacy at Versailles as an attempt to establish a "new", but "counter-revolutionary" style of diplomacy against "revolutionary" Soviet diplomacy.

Mayer's opinion was that the greatest failure of the Treaty of Versailles was that it was a triumph for the "Old Diplomacy" with only minor elements of "New Diplomacy". According to Mayer, the irrational fears generated by the Russian Revolution resulted in an international system designed to contain the Soviet Union. A major influence on Mayer was the British historian E. H. Carr, who was his friend and mentor. In 1961, Mayer played a major role in the American publication of Carr's book What Is History? Many of Mayer's writings concerning international affairs during the interwar era use the assumptions of Carr's 1939 book The Twenty Years’ Crisis.

In his 1981 book, The Persistence of the Old Regime, Mayer argued that there was an "umbilical cord" linking all events of European history from 1914 to 1945. In Mayer's opinion, World War I was proof that "[t]hough losing ground to the forces of industrial capitalism, the forces of the old order were still sufficiently willful and powerful to resist and slow down the course of history, if necessary by recourse to violence." Mayer argued that the nobility continued as the dominant class in Europe because it owned most of the land and the middle class were divided and undeveloped politically. Mayer argued that challenged by a world in which it was losing their function, the aristocracy promoted reactionary beliefs such as those of Friedrich Nietzsche and Social Darwinism, together with a belief in dictatorship and fascist dictatorship in particular. In Mayer's opinion, "It would take two world wars and the Holocaust […] finally to dislodge the feudal and aristocratic presumption from Europe's civil and political societies."

In his 1988 book Why Did the Heavens Not Darken?, Mayer argued that Adolf Hitler ordered the Final Solution in December 1941 in response to the realisation that the Wehrmacht could not capture Moscow, hence ensuring Nazi Germany's defeat by the Soviet Union. In Mayer's opinion, the Judeocide (Mayer's preferred term for the Holocaust) was the horrific climax of the "Thirty Years' Crisis" that had been raging in Europe since 1914. The book considers the Holocaust as primarily an expression of anti-communism:

Anti-Semitism did not play a decisive or even significant role in the growth of the Nazi movement and electorate. The appeals of Nazism were many and complex. People rallied to a syncretic creed of ultra-nationalism, Social Darwinism, anti-Marxism, anti-bolshevism, and anti-Semitism, as well as to a party program calling for the revision of Versailles, the repeal of reparations, the curb of industrial capitalism, and the establishment of a völkisch welfare state.

Mayer stated that one purpose of Why Did the Heavens Not Darken? was to put an end to a "cult of remembrance" that, in his opinion, had "become overly sectarian". In his opinion, Hitler's war was first and foremost against the Soviets, not the Jews. According to Mayer, the original German plan was to defeat the Soviet Union, and then to deport all the Soviet Jews to a reservation behind the Urals.

In regard to the functionalist-intentionalist divide that once pervaded Holocaust historiography, Mayer's work can be considered as intermediate between the two schools. Mayer argued that there was no masterplan for genocide and that the Holocaust cannot be explained solely in regard to Hitler's world view. At the same time, Mayer agreed with intentionalist historians such as Andreas Hillgruber in considering Operation Barbarossa and the Nazi crusade to annihilate "Judeo-Bolshevism" as major developments in the genesis of the "Final Solution to the Jewish Question."

== Critical responses to Why Did the Heavens Not Darken? ==
Why Did the Heavens Not Darken? received mixed reviews. The British historian Richard J. Evans, summarising reviews of the book, wrote that "some of the more printable" verdicts included "a mockery of memory and history," "bizarre," and "perverse."

Two prominent critics of Why Did the Heavens Not Darken? were Daniel Goldhagen and Lucy Dawidowicz. Both questioned Mayer's account of the murder of Jews during the early phases of World War II. They argued that the organized and systemic role of Nazis was much greater than Mayer stated. Both accused Mayer of attempting to rationalize the Holocaust and compared him to the right-wing historian Ernst Nolte. The American historian Peter Baldwin considered that Goldhagen had missed Mayer's overall point about the association between the war against the Soviet Union and the Holocaust, while D. D. Guttenplan described their "distortion" of Mayer's opinions as "disgraceful", noting also that

Arno Mayer's book opens with "A Personal Preface" telling of his own hair-raising escape from Luxembourg and occupied France, and of the fate of his grandfather, who refused to leave Luxembourg and died in Theresienstadt. Such personal bona fides didn't prevent the Anti-Defamation League from including Mayer in its 1993 "Hitler's Apologists: The Anti-Semitic Propaganda of Holocaust Revisionism", where his work is cited as an example of "legitimate historical scholarship which relativizes the genocide of the Jews." Mayer's crime is to "have argued, with no apparent anti-Semitic motivation"—- note how the absence of evidence itself becomes incriminating—- "that though millions of Jews were killed during WWII, there was actually no premeditated policy for this destruction."

Reviewers criticized Mayer's account of the Holocaust as emphasizing Nazi anti-communism too much at the expense of antisemitism. Israeli historian Yehuda Bauer alleged that

when a Holocaust survivor such as Arno J. Mayer of Princeton University ... popularizes the nonsense that the Nazis saw in Marxism and bolshevism their main enemy, and the Jews unfortunately got caught up in this; when he links the destruction of the Jews to the ups and downs of German warfare in the Soviet Union, in a book that is so cocksure of itself that it does not need a proper scientific apparatus, he is really engaging in a much more subtle form of Holocaust denial. He in effect denies the motivation for murder and flies in the face of well-known documentation.

Another controversy concerned what Robert Jan van Pelt termed Mayer's "well-meant but ill-considered reflection on the causes of death in Auschwitz". Mayer had concluded as follows: "certainly at Auschwitz, but probably overall, more Jews were killed by so-called 'natural' causes than by 'unnatural' ones." This conclusion removed the lingering restraints—if any actually remained—preventing David Irving from publicly announcing he did not believe the gas chambers at Nazi camps like Auschwitz existed. Guttenplan termed Mayer's musing on differences between 'natural' and 'unnatural' deaths, even if the terms were used in quotation marks, "indefensible".

Holocaust deniers have often quoted out of context Mayer's sentences in the book: "Sources for the study of the gas chambers are at once rare and unreliable". As the authors Michael Shermer and Alex Grobman have noted, the entire paragraph from which the sentence comes states that the SS destroyed the majority of the documentation relating to the operation of the gas chambers in the death camps, which is why Mayer feels that sources for the operation of the gas chambers are "rare" and "unreliable".

Despite this, in 2022, Mayer received the U.S. Holocaust Memorial Museum's Elie Wiesel Award, representing the Ritchie Boys. The award recognizes those who "have singularly advanced the Museum’s vision of the permanence of Holocaust memory, understanding, and relevance."

== 2001–2023 ==
Mayer was very critical of the policies of the United States government. When interviewed for a 2003 documentary, he described the Roman Empire as a "tea party" in comparison to its American counterpart.

Mayer's book, Plowshares into Swords (2008) is an anti-Zionist and pro-Palestinian account of Israeli history, tracing what Mayer regards as the degradation of Jewry in general and Zionism in particular with respect to what Mayer considers as Israeli colonial aggression against the Palestinians. In a largely favorable review, the British writer Geoffrey Wheatcroft termed Plowshares into Swords an enlightening account of Israeli history that traces such people as Martin Buber, Judah Magnes, Yeshayahu Leibowitz and, perhaps unexpectedly, Vladimir Jabotinsky and critiques the "chauvinistic and brutalising tendencies of Zionism". In a negative review of the book, British literary scholar Simon Goldhill, an authority on Greek tragedy, said it was of little value as history and criticized Mayer for his political bias, arguing that Mayer ignored Arab acts and media rhetoric against Jewish settlers and Israelis, falsely portrayed the Six-Day War in 1967 as a "calculated imperialist plot", claimed that all Western criticism of the Islamic world for human rights issues is nothing more than self-interested, and described Arab feeling toward Jews buying property in Palestine in the 1920s as "righteous anger".

== Death ==
Mayer died in Princeton on December 18, 2023, at the age of 97.

== Partial publications list ==
=== Books ===
- Mayer, Arno J. (2008). Plowshares into Swords: From Zionism to Israel (London: Verso, 2008). Verso Books. ISBN 978-1-84467-235-6.
- Mayer, Arno J. (2002-01-15). The Furies: Violence and Terror in the French and Russian Revolutions (Princeton, NJ: Princeton University Press, 2001). Princeton University Press. ISBN 0-691-09015-7.
- Mayer, Arno J. (1988). Why Did the Heavens Not Darken? The "Final Solution" in History (New York, NY: Pantheon Books, 1988). Pantheon Books. ISBN 978-0-394-57154-6.
- Mayer, Arno J. (1981). The Persistence of the Old Regime: Europe to the Great War (New York, NY: Pantheon Books, 1981). Pantheon Books. ISBN 978-0-394-51141-2.
- Mayer, Arno J. (1971). Dynamics of Counterrevolution in Europe, 1870–1956: An Analytic Framework (New York, NY: Harper & Row, 1971). Harper & Row. ISBN 978-0-061-31579-4.
- Politics and Diplomacy of Peacemaking: Containment and Counterrevolution at Versailles, 1918–1919 (New York, NY: Alfred A. Knopf, 1967).
- Wilson vs. Lenin: Political Origins of the New Diplomacy, 1917–1918 (New Haven, CT: Yale University Press, 1959).

=== Chapters and journal articles ===
- Mayer, Arno J. (2001). "On Arno Mayer's The Furies: Violence and Terror in the French and Russian Revolutions: Response". French Historical Studies. 24 (4): 589–600. doi:10.1215/00161071-24-4-589. JSTOR 826818.
- "The Primacy of Domestic Politics". In Holger Herwig, ed., The Outbreak of World War I (pp. 42–47). 6th ed. Boston, MA: Houghton Mifflin. 1996. ISBN 978-0-669-41692-3.
- Mayer, Arno J. (1995). "The Perils of Emancipation: Protestants and Jews". Archives de sciences sociales des religions. 90 (90): 5–37. doi:10.3406/assr.1995.982. JSTOR 30116319.
- "Memory and History: On the Poverty of Forgetting and Remembering about the Judeocide". Radical History Review. 56: 5–20. 1993. doi:10.1215/01636545-1993-56-5.
- "Internal Crisis and War Since 1870". In Charles L. Bertrand, ed., Revolutionary Situations in Europe, 1917–22 (pp. 201–233). Montreal: Interuniversity Centre for European Studies. 1977. ISBN 978-0-919-95803-6.
- Mayer, Arno J. (1975). "The Lower Middle Class as Historical Problem". The Journal of Modern History. 47 (3): 409–436. doi:10.1086/241338. JSTOR 1876000. S2CID 145466695.
- Mayer, Arno J. (1969). "Internal Causes and Purposes of War in Europe, 1870–1956: A Research Assignment". The Journal of Modern History. 41 (3): 291–303. doi:10.1086/240409. JSTOR 1899384. S2CID 144059245.
- "The Domestic Causes of the First World War". In Leonard Krieger and Fritz Stern, eds., The Responsibility of Power: Historical Essays in Honor of Hajo Holborn (pp. 286–293). Garden City, NY: Doubleday and Company. 1967.
- Mayer, Arno J. (1966). "Post-War Nationalisms 1918–1919". Past & Present (34): 114–126. doi:10.1093/past/34.1.114. JSTOR 650058.

Awards
Preceded by Terry Eagleton	Deutscher Memorial Prize; 1990	Succeeded by Mike Davis
