= Richard Sakwa =

British political scientist

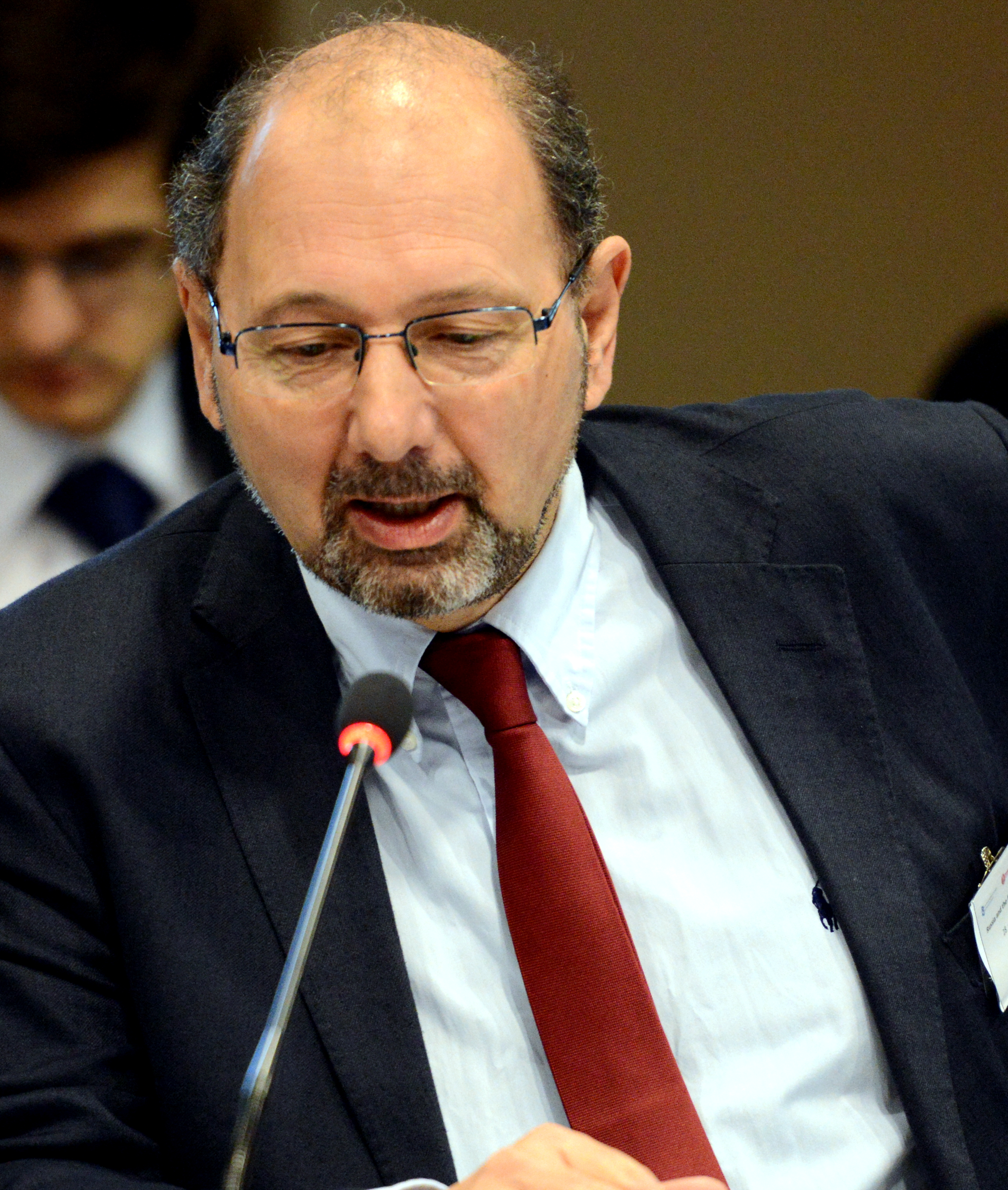
Richard Sakwa at the IEIS conference "Russia and the EU: the question of trust" (28–29 November 2014)

Richard Sakwa (born 22 August 1953, Norwich) is a British political scientist and a former professor of Russian and European politics at the University of Kent and an honorary professor in the Faculty of Political Science at Moscow State University. He has written books about Russian, Central and Eastern European communist and post-communist politics.

== Early life and family ==
Richard Sakwa is of British (through his maternal side) and Polish (through his paternal side) descent. He is the son of Zenon Sakwa (a Polish citizen) and Andree Dumar (a British citizen). Sakwa's father Zenon was an agronomist who later joined the Polish Army during the German and Soviet invasion of Poland. Zenon later escaped to Hungary and joined the Polish Second Corps under Lieutenant general Władysław Anders. Following the end of World War Two, Zenon and his family were granted refuge in the United Kingdom and settled down. Sakwa married Roza T. in November 1981 and the couple have two sons.

== Career ==
Sakwa completed a Bachelor of Arts at the London School of Economics in 1975 and his PhD at the University of Birmingham under the supervision of R. W. Davies in 1984. Sakwa's PhD looked at Moscow politics during the Russian Civil War. He also spent a year on a British Council scholarship at Moscow State University between 1979 and 1980. Sakwa also worked at Mir Publishers and taught at the University of Essex and the University of California, Santa Cruz. In 1987, Sakwa joined the University of Kent, and was promoted to Professor in 1996.

Sakwa is Emeritus Professor of Russian and European politics at the University of Kent. From 2001 to 2007 he was also the head of the University's Politics and International Relations department. He has published on Soviet, Russian and post-communist affairs, and has written and edited several books and articles on the subject.

Sakwa was a participant in the Valdai Discussion Club, an associate fellow of the Russia and Eurasia Programme at the Royal Institute of International Affairs, a member of the advisory boards of the Institute of Law and Public Policy in Moscow and a member of Academy of Learned Societies for the Social Sciences. He was invited to share his views on current political issues on RT, CGTN and has written in The Guardian, Open. Sakwa has also spoken at Stop The War Coalition events. He has also given written interviews to the Slovak website Štandard and the Finnish Rauhan Puolustajat.

His book Frontline Ukraine is about the origins of the Russo-Ukrainian War. It argues that the Ukrainian conflict was the result of internal Ukrainian issues (Ukrainian Crisis) becoming hostage to a new Cold War with Ukraine at its focal point (Ukraine Crisis). According to him, the new Cold War was the result of a profound misunderstanding between the West and Russia, with the latter being treated as a defeated power following the collapse of the USSR. Sakwa argues that it is "wrong-headed in conceptualization and dangerous in its consequences" to describe Russia as expansionist: "Russia under Putin is not a land-grabbing state, it is a profoundly conservative power and its actions are designed to maintain the status quo... [Russia] makes no claim to revise the existing international order, but to make it more inclusive and universal." Sakwa argues that Russia's war with Georgia was a breaking point in Russia-US relations, with Russia becoming more insistent on its security concerns, and a response to the shelling of Russian peacekeepers, a point confirmed by the ICRC.

His 2021 book Deception argues that investigations into Russiagate – allegations that Donald Trump colluded with Russia to win the 2016 U.S. presidential election – were politically biased and based on unverified documents. He said the investigations polarised the U.S. and politicised the intelligence community, which greatly damaged the country and soured U.S.–Russia relations.

== Reception ==
Sakwa's 2015 book Frontline Ukraine was well-received by political scientist Serhiy Kudelia in openDemocracy.

According to Paul Robinson, Professor of Public and International Affairs at the University of Ottawa, "Sakwa supports his thesis with considerable evidence and lays out a powerful case. He is entirely right to point out that the war in Donbas is as much a product of the actions of those who protested on Maidan and subsequently took power in Kiev, as of Russia."

Taras Kuzio, ex-director of the NATO Information and Documentation Center in Kyiv, criticised Sakwa for what he saw as "pro-Russian bias and lack of expertise on Ukraine", and has described him as a "pro-Putin scholar".

Geoffrey Roberts, professor of history at University College Cork, notes: "Sakwa offers a strong interpretation, critical of ethnic nationalism and tending to favour the Russian and “blue” point of view. But he treats differing perspectives fairly and is meticulous in his reconstruction of events, whether it is the violent escalation of the Maidan protests, the secession of Crimea, the revolt in eastern Ukraine or Russia’s role in the crisis."

Sarah Lain, member of the Royal United Services Institute and Research Advisor in Kyiv, describes Sakwa as essentially providing the Russian perspective on the Russo-Ukrainian war.

Michael Rochlitz, an associate fellow at the Higher School of Economics in Moscow, described Sakwa's 2020 book Putin Redux, which is about Vladimir Putin, as "detailed, balanced and sober".

A review in the Journal of Ukrainian Studies describes Frontline Ukraine as "openly polemical" and a "one-sided treatment of contemporary Russian politics and of Putin’s regime".

Paul Wingrove, former Senior Lecturer in Politics at the University of Greenwich, "advises that readers exercise caution and their own judgment when navigating texts on this highly debated political terrain" but simultaneously "praises Sakwa’s masterful account as a fine-grained, well-sourced analysis".

Paul D'Anieri describes it as "a polemical attack on Western policy... and a defense of Russia... Sakwa clearly sympathizes with Russia's position.". Nevertheless he references Sakwa's arguments in Ukraine and Russia - From Civilised Divorce To Uncivil War.

Maria Lipman, a Russian journalist, political scientist and Russia expert, wrote in Foreign Affairs that Sakwa's 2021 book Deception "is an exceptionally detailed and well-documented account of all the major episodes covered by the Trump-Russia probes." In a 2023 study Oliver Boyd-Barrett said that he considered Deception "at the time of writing, to be the soundest, most empirical, and comprehensive analysis" of Russiagate."

Nick Hordern, former diplomat and journalist, notes that "Sakwa's book is a salutary challenge to the very basis of Australian foreign policy: the principle that Washington is always right."

In his International Affairs review of Sakwa's book "The Culture of the Second Cold War", Ian Garner, Assistant Professor at the Center for Totalitarian Studies at the Pilecki Institute, criticizes, that Sakwa - despite offering some "interesting contentions" - "soon moves away from any sort of academic analysis into realms bordering on the conspiratorial" and that "the book boils down to a flawed attempt to prove that western intransigence provoked Russia's war against Ukraine".

== Published works ==
=== Books ===
- The Russo-Ukrainian War: Follies of Empire. Lynne Rienner Publishers. 2026.
- The Culture of the Second Cold War. Anthem Press. 2025.
- The Lost Peace: How the West Failed to Prevent a Second Cold War. New Haven London: Yale University Press. 3 October 2023. ISBN 978-0-300-25501-0.
- Deception: Russiagate and the New Cold War. Bloomsbury Academic. 15 January 2022. ISBN 978-1-7936-4495-4.
- The Putin Paradox. I.B. Tauris. 6 February 2020. ISBN 978-1-78831-830-3.
- Hale, Henry E.; White, Stephen (27 November 2018). Developments in Russian Politics 9. London: Red Globe Press. ISBN 978-1-352-00467-0.
- Russia Against the Rest. Cambridge, United Kingdom New York, NY, USA Port Melbourne, VIC, Australia New Delhi, India Singapore: Cambridge University Press. 12 October 2017. ISBN 978-1-316-61351-1.
- Frontline Ukraine: crisis in the borderlands. London: Tauris. 2015. ISBN 978-1-78453-064-8.
- The Crisis of Russian Democracy. Cambridge: Cambridge University Press. 16 December 2010. ISBN 978-0-521-14522-0.
- Communism in Russia. Houndmills, Basingstoke, Hampshire New York, NY: Red Globe Press. 11 August 2010. ISBN 978-0-333-60679-7.
  - Russian edition: Коммунизм в России: интерпретирующее эссе. — М.: РОССПЭН, 2011. — 160 с. — (История сталинизма). — ISBN 978-5-8243-1596-7.
- Quality of Freedom: Putin, Khodorkovsky and the Yukos Affair (Oxford, Oxford University Press, 2009), pp. 426. ISBN 978-0-19-921157-9
- Putin: Russia’s Choice, fully revised and updated 2nd edn (London and New York, Routledge, 2008), pp. 388. [ISBN 978-0-415-40765-6 (hbk); ISBN 978-0-415-40766-3 (pbk); ISBN 978-0-203-93193-6 (ebk)]
  - Putin: El Elegido de Rusia (Madrid, Ediciones Folio, S.A., 2005). ISBN 84-413-2251-1
- Russian Politics and Society, Fourth Edition, completely rewritten and reorganised (London and New York, Routledge, 2008), pp. 585. [ISBN 0-415-41527-6 (hbk), ISBN 0-415-41528-4 (pbk), ISBN 0-203-93125-4 (ebk); ISBN 978-0-415-41527-9 (hbk), ISBN 978-0-415-41528-6 (pbk), ISBN 978-0-203-93125-7 (ebk)] Fifth Edition (2021).
- The Rise and Fall of the Soviet Union, in the Routledge Sources in History series, General Editor: David Welch, Professor of Modern History, UKC (London, Routledge, 1999), pp.xxi + 521. [ISBN (hbk) 0-415-12289; (pbk) 0-415-12290-2] A book of annotated documents charting the political and moral trajectory of communism in the USSR.
- Postcommunism, in the series Concepts in the Social Sciences, General Editor Frank Parkin (Buckingham and Philadelphia, Open University Press, 1999), pp. 144. [ISBN 0-335-20058-3 (hbk); ISBN 0-335-20057-5 (pbk)] Translated into Portuguese as O Pós-comunismo (Lisbon, Instituto Piaget, 2001), pp. 203. ISBN 972-771-443-9. Spanish translation went to press in September 2004.
- Soviet Politics in Perspective, Second fully reworked edition of Soviet Politics: An Introduction (London, Routledge, October 1998), pp. xiii + 355. [ISBN 0-415-16992-5 (hbk); ISBN 0-415-07153-4 (pbk)]
- Gorbachev and His Reforms, 198590 (London, Philip Allan/Simon and Schuster, October 1990; Englewood Cliffs, NJ, Prentice Hall, February 1991), pp. xiv + 459. [0-86003-423-2 (hbk); 0-86003-723-1 (pbk)]
- Soviet Politics: An Introduction (London and New York, Routledge, June 1989), pp. xvi + 356. [ISBN 0-415-00505-1 (hbk); ISBN 0-415-00506-X (pbk)]
- Soviet Communists in Power: A Study of Moscow During the Civil War, 1918–21 (London, Macmillan, July 1988; New York, St Martins, 1988), pp. xxii + 342. [0-333-39847-5]

=== Edited Books ===
- With Agnieszka Pikulicka-Wilczewska: Ukraine and Russia. People, Politics, Propaganda and Perspectives. Bristol: E-International Relations Publishing. 2015. ISBN 978-1-910814-14-7.
- With Anne Stevens: Contemporary Europe. Palgrave Macmillan. 2006. ISBN 978-1-4039-4567-9.
- Chechnya: From Past to Future. London: Anthem. 2005. ISBN 978-1-84331-164-5.
