= Jonathan Haslam =

American historian and Sovietologist (born 1951)

Academic background
- Education: London School of Economics

Academic work
- Discipline: Historian
- Institutions: Institute for Advanced Study
- Main interests: History of the Soviet Union

Jonathan Haslam (born January 15, 1951) is past George F. Kennan Professor in the School of Historical Studies at the Institute for Advanced Study in Princeton and emeritus Professor of the History of International Relations at the University of Cambridge with a special interest in the former Soviet Union. He has written many books about Soviet foreign policy and ideology.

== Education and career ==
Haslam studied at the London School of Economics (B.Sc.Econ 1972), Trinity College, Cambridge (M.Litt. 1978), and was awarded his Ph.D. at the University of Birmingham in 1984. He has lectured at many institutions including: the University of Birmingham 1975–1984; Johns Hopkins University, 1984–1986; University of California, Berkeley, 1987–1988; King's College, Cambridge, 1988–1992; Yale University 1996; Harvard University, 2001; Stanford University, 1986–1987, 1994, 2005; and the University of Cambridge 1991–2015. Haslam joined the faculty of the School of Historical Studies at the Institute for Advanced Study on July 1, 2015.

Most of Haslam's works deal with the history of the Soviet Union. During his tenure at the University of Cambridge, he wrote: "My first political memory was the Cuban missile crisis of 1962. It was the only time I saw my father afraid as he thought it entirely possible–through his London contacts–that we would all be blown up. Now I know how close we came. I have thus spent most of my life in pursuit of an explanation for the Cold War by focusing on the Soviet Union."

== Works ==
=== Hubris, 2024 ===
In this work, subtitled The American Origins of Russia’s War Against Ukraine, Haslam critiques U.S. foreign policy post-Cold War, arguing that American decisions and NATO expansion contributed to tensions leading up to the Russian invasion of Ukraine since February 2022. He emphasises that the West's disregard for Russia's security concerns played a significant role in the escalation.

The book has sparked discussions on Western accountability in the Ukraine crisis. A review in Foreign Affairs by Mary Sarotte highlights how Haslam's analysis challenges prevailing narratives by focusing on Western actions post-1991 but criticises its factual accuracy.

=== The Spectre of War, 2021 ===
Haslam examines how the fear of international communism influenced the policies of European powers in the lead-up to World War II. He argues that anti-communist sentiments significantly shaped international relations during the interwar period. The work has been praised for its thorough research and fresh perspective on the origins of WW II. Europe-Asia Studies commends Haslam for shedding light on the impact of ideological fears on diplomatic decisions.

=== Near and Distant Neighbors, 2015 ===
This book provides a comprehensive history of Soviet intelligence operations, detailing their evolution and impact on global affairs. Haslam delves into the organisational structure and strategic objectives of Soviet intelligence agencies. Scholars have lauded the book for its insightful analysis and contribution to understanding Soviet espionage.

=== Russia’s Cold War, 2011 ===
Haslam explores the Soviet Union's role in the Cold War, focusing on its foreign policy and ideological motivations from 1917 to 1991. He challenges Western-centric narratives by presenting the Soviet perspective on global events. The book is recognized for its balanced approach and depth of analysis, offering valuable insights into Soviet strategies during the Cold War.

=== The Nixon Administration and the Death of Allende’s Chile, 2005 ===
This work investigates the U.S. involvement in the 1973 Chilean coup d'état, arguing that the Nixon administration played a pivotal role in undermining President Allende's government, leading to its downfall. Haslam's meticulous research has been praised for shedding light on a controversial chapter in U.S. foreign policy.

=== No Virtue Like Necessity, 2002 ===
Haslam traces the development of realist theory in international relations, examining key thinkers from Machiavelli to the 20th century. He discusses how realist thought has influenced global politics over the centuries. The book is esteemed for its comprehensive overview and critical analysis of realist philosophy in international affairs.

=== The Vices of Integrity: E.H. Carr 1892–1982, 1999 ===
This biography delves into the life and work of historian E.H. Carr, exploring his contributions to historiography and international relations theory. Haslam examines Carr's complex legacy and intellectual journey. Critics have highlighted the book's depth and nuanced portrayal of Carr, appreciating its contribution to understanding a significant figure in historical scholarship.

=== The Soviet Union and the Threat from the East, 1933–41: Moscow, Tokyo, and the Prelude to the Pacific War, 1992 ===
Haslam analyzes the Soviet Union's foreign policy in East Asia during the 1930s, focusing on its relations with Japan and the strategic considerations leading up to the Pacific War. The work is recognized for its detailed examination of a less-studied aspect of Soviet foreign relations, contributing valuable insights into pre-WWII geopolitics.

=== The Soviet Union and the Politics of Nuclear Weapons in Europe, 1969–87, 1990 ===
This book explores the Soviet Union's nuclear strategy and its political implications in Europe during the late Cold War period. Haslam discusses the interplay between military considerations and diplomatic negotiations. Scholars have commended the book for its thorough research and contribution to understanding nuclear diplomacy during a critical era.

=== Soviet Foreign Policy, 1930–1933: The Impact of the Depression, 1983 ===
Haslam examines how the global economic depression influenced Soviet foreign policy decisions in the early 1930s, highlighting the intersection of economic and political factors.The book is valued for its insightful analysis of the economic underpinnings of Soviet diplomacy during a tumultuous period.

== Bibliography ==
- Hubris: The American Origins of Russia's War against Ukraine. Bloomsbury Publishing, 2024, ISBN 9780674299078
- The Spectre of War: International Communism and the Origins of World War II. Princeton, NJ: Princeton University Press, 2021, ISBN 9780691182650
- Near and Distant Neighbors: A New History of Soviet Intelligence. New York: Farrar, Straus and Giroux, 2015, ISBN 0374219907
- Secret Intelligence in the European States System, 1918-1989. (eds), Stanford University Press, 2013
- Russia's Cold War: From the October Revolution to the Fall of the Wall. New Haven: Yale University Press, 2011, ISBN 0300188196
- The Nixon Administration and the Death of Allende's Chile: A Case of Assisted Suicide. London, New York: Verso, 2005, ISBN 1844670309
- No Virtue Like Necessity: Realist Thought in International Relations Since Machiavelli. Yale University Press, 2002.
- The Vices of Integrity: E.H. Carr 1892-1982. Verso, 1999.
- The Soviet Union and the Threat from the East: 1933-41: Moscow, Tokyo, and the prelude to the Pacific War. Pittsburgh, PA: University of Pittsburgh Press, 1992, ISBN 0822911671
- The Soviet Union and the Politics of Nuclear Weapons in Europe, 1969–87. Ithaca, NY: Cornell University Press, 1990, ISBN 0801423945
- The Soviet Union and the Struggle for Collective Security in Europe, 1933–39. New York: St. Martin's Press, 1984, ISBN 0312749082
- Soviet Foreign Policy, 1930–33: The Impact of the Depression. New York: St. Martin's Press, 1983, ISBN 0312748388
