= Julian Cooper =

British academic (born 1945)

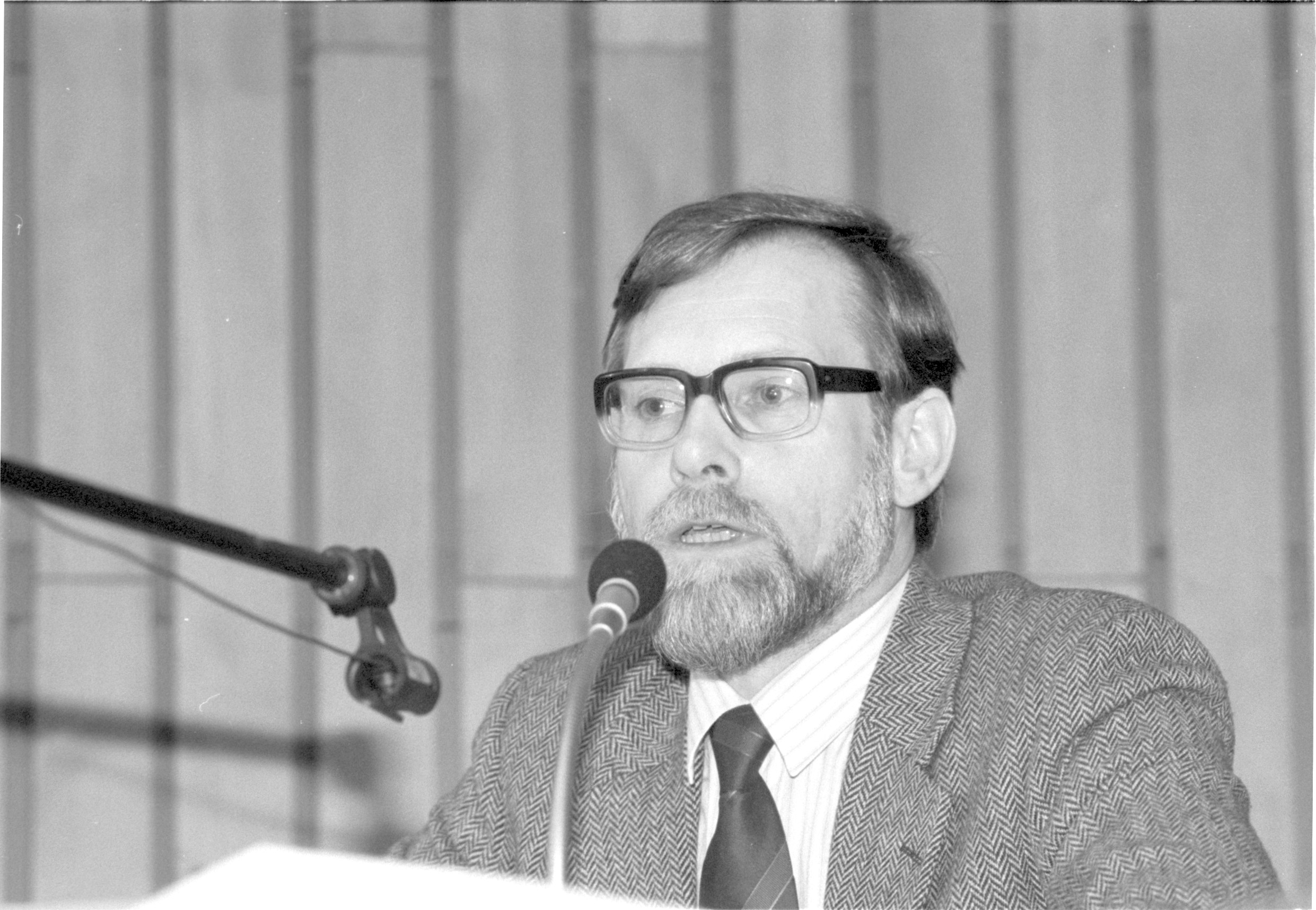
Cooper in 1989

Julian Marc Cooper OBE (born 1945) is a British academic, and specialist on Russian economic matters, including Russian defence budget and military expenditure.

Cooper graduated from the University of Bath with a BSc degree in economics in 1968. He graduated from the Department of Industrial Economics and Business Studies and the Centre for Russian and East European Studies at Birmingham University with a PhD in 1975 for a thesis on "The development of the Soviet machine tool industry, 1917–1941", supervised by R. W. Davies.

Cooper was director of the Centre for Russian, and East European Studies at Birmingham University from 1990 to 2001, and from 2007 to 2008. He is currently professor emeritus at Birmingham University. Cooper was co-director of the Centre for East European Language-Based Area Studies from 2006 to 2011. He is an associate fellow of the Russia and Eurasia programme at the Chatham House, the Royal Institute of International Affairs.

Cooper has advised successive British governments, the British Foreign and Commonwealth Office, and US governmental agencies on Russian economic matters. He has also advised international organizations such as NATO, the European Commission, the Organisation for Economic Co-operation and Development, the International Labour Organization, the Stockholm International Peace Research Institute.

Professor Cooper was appointed an Officer of the Order of the British Empire (OBE) for services to Soviet and Russian economic studies in the 2012 New Year Honours in the Diplomatic Service and Overseas list.

== Works ==
Securitising Russia: The Domestic Politics of Vladimir Putin (2013), with Edwin Bacon and Bettina Renz

The Soviet Defence Industry: Conversion and Reform (Royal Institute of International Affairs, 1991)
