= Nationalism and After =

1945 book by E.H. Carr

- Author: Edward Hallett
- Publisher: Macmillan
- Publication date: 1945

Nationalism and After is a 1945 work by British historian and diplomat Edward Hallett Carr. The book compares the nationalist movements of the nineteenth century with those of the twentieth.

== Content ==
In Nationalism and After, Carr argues that nationalism was a byproduct of the rise of industrial capitalism and the accompanying changes in society and politics. In particular, he views the dissolution of the link between empire and church as an essential step towards the creation of the state. He views the French Revolution and Napoleonics as the culmination of the existing trend. Carr also examines the impact of nationalism on international relations, particularly in the aftermath of World War I and the Treaty of Versailles, which redrew the map of Europe and led to the rise of fascist and authoritarian regimes.

== Reception and legacy ==
The book is seen as a seminal work on the subject of nationalism and is still widely cited in modern scholarship. It is also noted for its critical perspective on the role of nationalism in shaping modern history and its emphasis on the need for a deeper understanding of the complexities of nationalism as a political ideology.
