= Conditions of Peace =

1942 book by Edward Hallett Carr

- First edition
- Author: Edward Hallett Carr
- Publisher: Macmillan Publishers
- Publication date: 1942

Conditions of Peace is a book written by Edward Hallett Carr, and first published in 1942.

In the book, Carr argued that it was a flawed economic system which had caused World War II, and that the only way of preventing another world war was for the Western powers to fundamentally change the economic basis of their societies by adopting socialism. Carr argued that the post-war world required a "European Planning Authority" and a "Bank of Europe" that would control the currencies, trade, and investment of all the European economies. One of the main sources for ideas in Conditions of Peace was the 1940 book Dynamics of War and Revolution by the American fascist Lawrence Dennis In a review of Conditions of Peace, the British writer Rebecca West criticised Carr for using Dennis as a source, commenting "It is as odd for a serious English writer to quote Sir Oswald Mosley" In a speech on June 2, 1942 in the House of Lords, Viscount Elibank attacked Carr as an "active danger" for his views in Conditions of Peace about a magnanimous peace with Germany and for suggesting that Britain turn over all of her colonies to an international commission after the war.

== See also ==
- The Twenty Years' Crisis
