= The Nixon Administration and the Death of Allende's Chile =

2005 book by Jonathan Haslam

- Author: Jonathan Haslam
- Language: English
- Subject: Political history
- Genre: Non-fiction
- Published: September 17, 2005
- Publisher: Verso Books
- Publication place: USA
- Pages: 245
- ISBN: 1844670309

The Nixon Administration and the Death of Allende's Chile: A Case of Assisted Suicide is a 2005 nonfiction book by Jonathan Haslam, detailing the Nixon administration's role in the overthrow of Salvador Allende, and further CIA efforts in Cuba.
