= Moshe Lewin =

Polish historian (1921–2010)

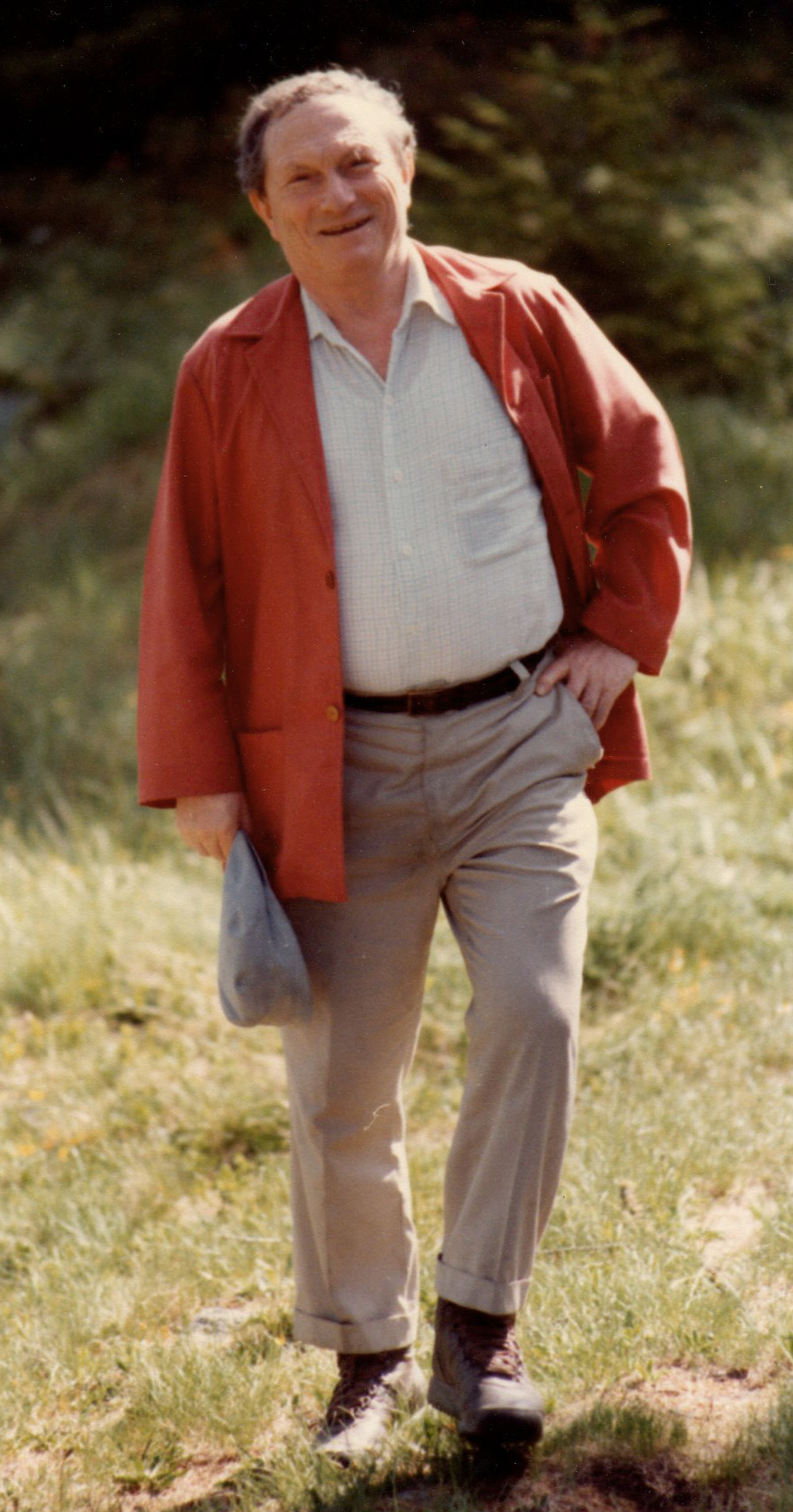
- Moshe Lewin in the mid-1980s
- Born: 7 November 1921; Wilno, Republic of Central Lithuania
- Died: 14 August 2010 (aged 88); Paris, France
- Occupations: Historian, academic

Academic background
- Education: Tel Aviv University (BA); University of Paris (PhD)
- Thesis: La paysannerie et le pouvoir soviétique, 1928-1930 : une étape historique de la collectivisation (1964)
- Doctoral advisor: Roger Portal

Academic work
- Discipline: Modern history
- Sub-discipline: History of the Soviet Union
- Institutions: University of Birmingham (1968–1978); University of Pennsylvania (1978–1995)

Moshe "Misha" Lewin (/ˌləˈvin/ lə-VEEN; 7 November 1921 – 14 August 2010) was a Polish-born scholar of Russian and Soviet history. He was a major figure in the school of Soviet studies which emerged in the 1960s and a socialist.

== Biography ==
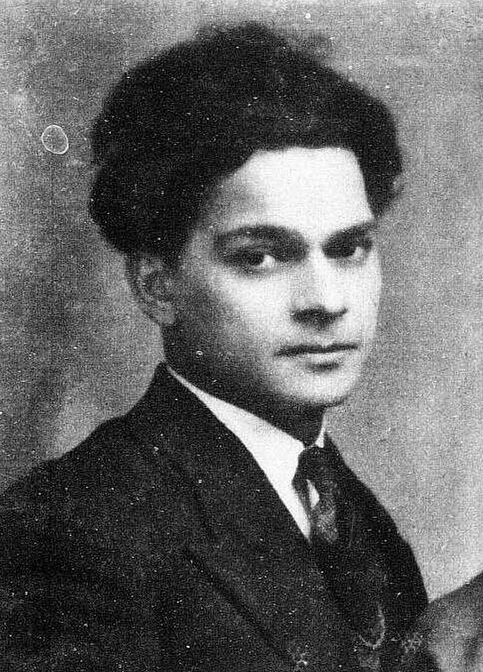
Lewin as second place winner of The Jewish Daily Forward's short story contest, 1937

Moshe Lewin was born in 1921 in Wilno, Republic of Central Lithuania (now Vilnius, Lithuania), the son of ethnic Jewish parents (a butcher and his Russian-speaking wife) who were later murdered in the Holocaust. Lewin lived in Poland for almost 20 years of his life and joined the Labor Zionist youth movement Hashomer Hatzair. In June 1941, as Nazi Germany invaded the Soviet Union, he fled the Lithuanian Soviet Socialist Republic with the retreating Red Army troops. For the next two years, Lewin worked as a collective farm worker and as a blast furnace operator in a metallurgical factory in the Ural Mountains. In the summer of 1943, he enlisted in the Red Army and was sent to an officers' training school, achieving promotion on the last day of World War II.

In 1946, Lewin returned to Poland before leaving for France, where he became involved in the smuggling of illegal Jewish migrants to Mandatory Palestine. A believer in Labor Zionism since his youth, in 1951 Lewin emigrated again, this time to Israel, where he worked for a time on a kibbutz and as a journalist (initially a contributor to the Mapam party daily Al HaMishmar, then an editor at Israeli Communist Party (MAKI)'s press organ Smol and at its daily newspaper Kol HaAm). He was called up to participate in Israel's 1956 Operation Kadesh against Egypt in the Sinai Peninsula and per his own account was jailed for protesting a massacre of Egyptian prisoners of war.

In his thirties, Lewin took up academic studies, receiving his Bachelor of Arts from Tel Aviv University, where he was taught by Zvi Yavetz and Charles Bloch, in 1961. That same year, Lewin was awarded a research scholarship to the Sorbonne in Paris, where he was influenced by the Annales School, befriended the sociologist Basile Kerblay, and studied the initial stage of the collectivization of Soviet agriculture. In 1964, he gained his Ph.D. there under the supervision of Roger Portal.

Following his graduation, Lewin worked as a directeur d'études at the École pratique des hautes études in Paris from 1965 to 1966 and a senior fellow at Columbia University from 1967 to 1968. He then received an appointment as a research professor at the University of Birmingham in the United Kingdom in 1968. In 1978, he moved to the United States and became a professor of history at the University of Pennsylvania, teaching there until his retirement in 1995. At Pennsylvania, he co-directed a series of influential seminars on the Soviet Union jointly with Alfred Rieber. He advised various agencies of the US government during the Cold War. In the early 1980s, he initiated the European Nuclear Disarmament movement along with Ken Coates and E. P. Thompson.

He was a regular contributor to the French monthly Le Monde diplomatique. He made his last visit to Israel in 1995.

Lewin died on 14 August 2010 in Paris and was buried at the Montmartre Cemetery. A letter from Eric Hobsbawm was read at his funeral. His papers are housed at the University of Pennsylvania in Philadelphia.

== Academic work and major publications ==
=== Russian Peasants and Soviet Power (1968) ===
During the Paris period, Lewin converted his Sorbonne dissertation into a book, published in French in 1966 and in English two years later as Russian Peasants and Soviet Power. This monograph dealt with the Soviet grain procurement crisis of 1928 and the associated political battle, a bitter fight which resulted in a decision to forcibly collectivize Soviet agriculture.

In this work, Lewin emphasized collectivization as a practical (albeit extreme) solution to a real world problem facing the Soviet regime, one out of several potential solutions to a crisis situation. Rather than an inevitable and predestined action, collectivization was cast as a brutal manifestation of realpolitik — a view in marked contrast to the traditionalist historiography of the day. Russian Peasants and Soviet Power was initially projected as the first part of a long study of the social history of Soviet Russia down to 1934, although the project seems to have been abandoned, perhaps as duplicative of the work of British historians E.H. Carr and R.W. Davies.

=== Lenin's Last Struggle (1968) ===
Lewin's other 1968 publication, Lenin's Last Struggle, was an extended essay that charted the evolution of Lenin's thinking about the growing bureaucracy of Soviet Russia. In it, Lewin additionally chronicled the politics of the post-Lenin succession struggle during the time of Lenin's final illness, emphasizing "lost" alternatives to the actual path of historical development.

In this book Lewin again offered a perspective in marked contrast to the voluminous writings of the totalitarianist school that then dominated academic writing about the Soviet Union, casting the USSR as a monolithic and fundamentally unchanging structure.

=== Political Undercurrents in Soviet Economic Debates (1974) ===
During his time at the University of Birmingham, Lewin published Political Undercurrents in Soviet Economic Debates: From Bukharin to the Modern Reformers, which, along with the work of Princeton University professor Stephen F. Cohen, helped to restore the name and ideas of Nikolai Bukharin to the academic debate concerning the Soviet 1920s. Lewin noted that many of the same criticisms which Bukharin leveled against Stalin during the political battles of 1928 and 1929 in the USSR were later "adopted by current reformers as their own," thereby adding a contemporary importance to the study of the historical past.

=== The Making of the Soviet System (1985) ===
Although regarded as a doyen of social history and a godfather of the so-called "revisionist" movement of young social historians who came to the fore in Soviet studies during the 1970s and 1980s, Lewin's own work largely centered on the relationship between high politics and economic policy.

One notable exception came with the publication in 1985 of a collection of Lewin's essays and lectures entitled The Making of the Soviet System. In this work, Lewin visited a number of key topics of social history such as rural social mores, popular religion, customary law in rural society, the social structure of the Russian peasantry, and social relations within Soviet industry. He emerged as a critic of the politicized "What are they up to?" orientation of Soviet studies, favoring a more apolitical perspective that attempted to answer the question, "What makes the Russians tick?"

=== The Soviet Century (2005) ===
Lewin's final works attempted to analyze the rise of Mikhail Gorbachev, and his brief efforts at top-down reform of the communist system, and to set the rise and fall of Soviet socialism in historical perspective.

In his last book, The Soviet Century (2005), Lewin argued that the political and economic system of the former Soviet Union constituted a sort of "bureaucratic absolutism" akin to the Prussian bureaucratic monarchy of the 18th century which had "ceased to accomplish the task it had once been capable of performing" and therefore given way.

== Legacy ==
In 1992, Lewin was honored with a Festschrift edited by historians Nick Lampert and Gábor Rittersporn entitled Stalinism: Its Nature and Aftermath: Essays in Honour of Moshe Lewin. Contributors to the volume included economic historians Alec Nove and R.W. Davies as well as key social historians such as Lewis Siegelbaum and Ronald Grigor Suny, among others.

In the Lewin Festschrift, co-editor Lampert summarized Lewin's work in the following manner: "The scope of Lewin's explorations has been very wide, dealing with a panorama of social classes and groups, with the lower depths of society as well as the bosses, with informal social norms as well as formal law, with popular religion as well as established ideology. The range of his intellectual debts is also broad, owing as much to Weber as to Marx, emphasising as much the power of ideologies and myths in human behaviour as the weight of economic structure. The key thing is the perception of society as a socio-cultural whole, though Lewin always remained open to new pathways that might appear in the course of research, always eclectic in the best sense, always eschewing the pursuit of a grand theory for all history — a pursuit which only leads you away from the rich canvas of concrete human experience."

== Views and interests ==
Lewin was described as "an ardent anti-Stalinist" who saw the right-wing tendency of Bukharinism in the Communist Party of the Soviet Union as a source of Soviet democratic renewal after de-Stalinization. He attributed to Nikolai Bukharin and his followers "a greater understanding of the peasant masses than the Trotskyist left", while valuing Vladimir Lenin's project of a "self-regulating dictatorship" as a path to socialist modernisation. In Sheila Fitzpatrick's view, he followed the Leninist distrust of state bureaucratism and Milovan Djilas's new class theory. He was also an admirer of the writings of Aleksandr Tvardovsky, the author of the poem Vasily Tyorkin and editor of the 1960s dissident literary journal Novy Mir. He described his own historiographical position as "anti-anti-Communism".

According to Fitzpatrick, Lewin denied the existence of a kulak class, "dealt sympathetically with peasants (as long as they remain in situ) and had never been much interested in the proletariat and its putative 'leading' role". He argued that the Soviet Union had never reached socialism and characterised it as a "bureaucratic absolutism" that resulted from its peasant roots.

== Works ==
- La Paysannerie et le pouvoir soviétique, 1928-1930. Paris: Mouton, 1966. English edition: Russian Peasants and Soviet Power: A Study of Collectivization, translated by Irene Nove with John Biggart, London: George Allen and Unwin, 1968.
- Le Dernier combat de Lénine, Paris: Les Editions de Minuit, 1967. English edition: Lenin's Last Struggle, translated by A.M. Sheridan Smith, New York: Random House, 1968.
- Political Undercurrents in Soviet Economic Debates: From Bukharin to the Modern Reformers, Princeton, NJ: Princeton University Press, 1974. Reissued as Stalinism and the Seeds of Soviet Reform: The Debates of the 1960s (1991).
- The Making of the Soviet System: Essays in the Social History of Interwar Russia, New York: Pantheon, 1985.
- The Gorbachev Phenomenon: A Historical Interpretation, Berkeley: University of California Press, 1988.
- Russia — USSR — Russia: The Drive and Drift of a Superstate, New York: The New Press, 1995.
- Stalinism and Nazism: Dictatorships in Comparison, Co-edited with Ian Kershaw. Cambridge, England: Cambridge University Press, 1997.
- The Soviet Century, London: Verso, 2005.
