= What Is History? =

1961 book by Edward Carr

What is History?
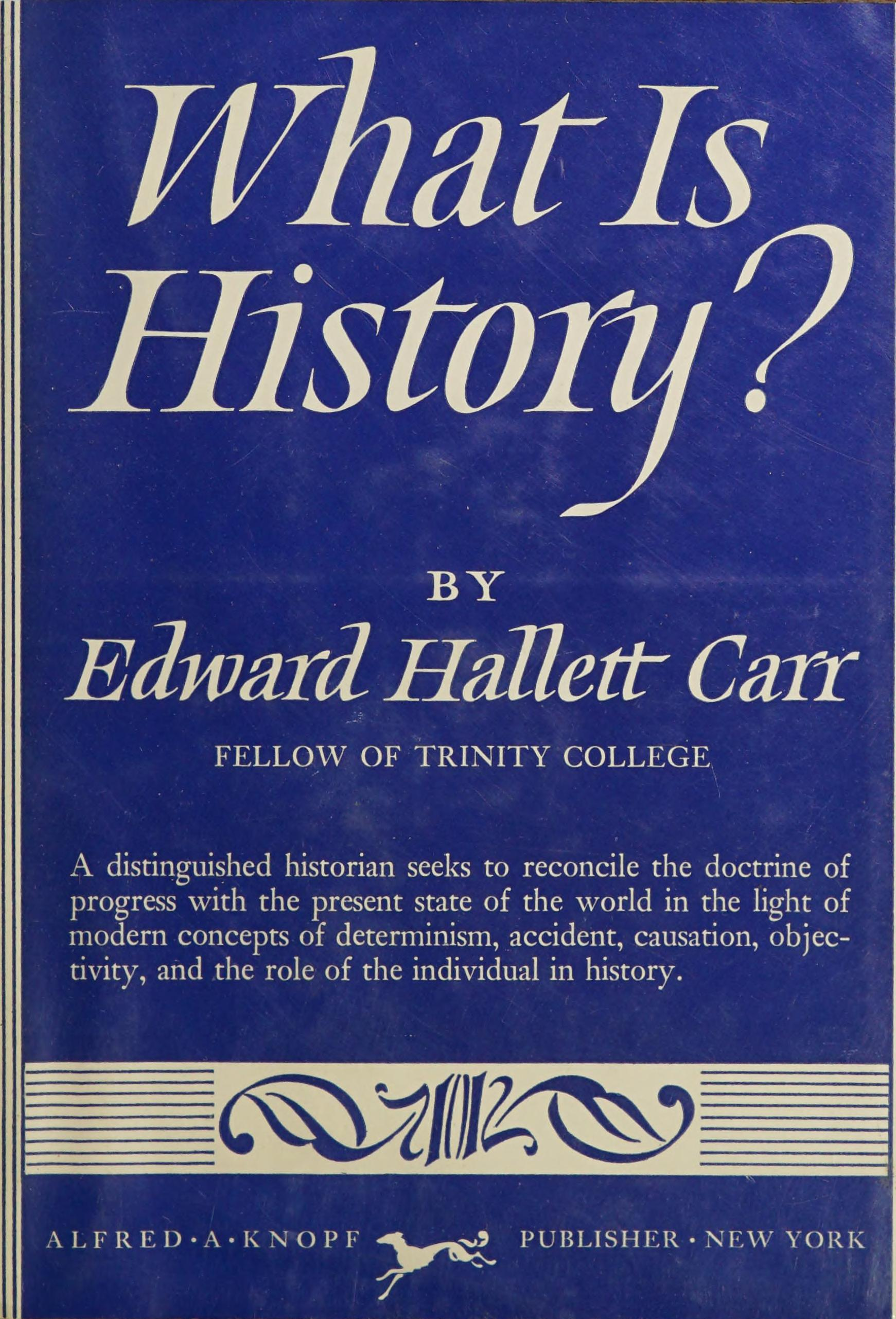
- Cover of first American edition, 1961
- Author: E. H. Carr
- Language: English
- Genre: Historiography lectures
- Publisher: University of Cambridge & Penguin Books
- Publication date: 1961
- Publication place: United Kingdom

What Is History? is a 1961 non-fiction book by historian E. H. Carr on historiography. It discusses history, facts, the bias of historians, science, morality, individuals and society, and moral judgements in history.

The book originated in a series of lectures given by Carr in 1961 at the University of Cambridge. The lectures were intended as a broad introduction into the subject of the theory of history and their accessibility has resulted in What is History? becoming one of the key texts in the field of historiography.

Some of Carr's ideas are contentious, particularly his relativism and his rejection of contingency as an important factor in historical analysis. His work provoked a number of responses, most notably Geoffrey Elton's The Practice of History.

Carr was in the process of revising What is History? for a second edition at the time of his death.

== Structure ==
The book begins with Chapter 1 The Historian and His Facts, this is followed by chapters on (2) Society and the Individual, (3) History, Science and Morality, (4) Causation in History and (5) History as Progress before finishing with a chapter (6) on The Widening Horizon. The 2001 edition includes a new introduction by R.J. Evans, and material from the 2nd edition including An Introductory note from R.W. Davies, a Preface to Second Edition by Carr himself, as well 'notes From E.H. Carr's Files also by Davies.

== Reception ==
Carr's views about the nature of historical work in What Is History? were controversial. In his 1967 book The Practice of History, Geoffrey Elton criticized Carr for his "whimsical" distinction between the "historical facts" and the "facts of the past", saying that it reflected "an extraordinarily arrogant attitude both to the past and to the place of the historian studying it". Elton praised Carr for rejecting the role of "accidents" in history, but said Carr's philosophy of history was an attempt to provide a secular version of the medieval view of history as the working of God's master plan with "Progress" playing the part of God.

British historian Hugh Trevor-Roper said Carr's dismissal of the "might-have-beens of history" reflected a fundamental lack of interest in examining historical causation. Trevor-Roper said examining possible alternative outcomes of history is not a "parlour-game", but is an essential part of historians' work. Trevor-Roper said historians could properly understand the period under study only by looking at all possible outcomes and all sides; historians who adopted Carr's perspective of only seeking to understand the winners of history and treating the outcome of a particular set of events as the only possible outcomes, were "bad historians".

In a review in 1963 in Historische Zeitschrift, Andreas Hillgruber wrote favourably of Carr's geistvoll-ironischer (ironically spirited) criticism of conservative, liberal and positivist historians. British philosopher W. H. Walsh said in a 1963 review that it is not a "fact of history" that he had toast for breakfast that day. Walsh said Carr was correct that historians did not stand above history, and were instead products of their own places and times, which in turn decided what "facts of the past" they determined into "facts of history".

British historian Richard J. Evans said What Is History? caused a revolution in British historiography in the 1960s. Australian historian Keith Windschuttle, a critic of Carr, said What Is History? is one of the most influential books written about historiography, and that very few historians working in the English language since the 1960s had not read it.

== Editions ==
The first edition was published in 1961, with reprints in 1961, 1962 (twice), 1969, 1972, 1977 and 1982. In 1986 a posthumous second edition was published with a preface by Bob Davies. This edition was reprinted in 2001 with a substantial critical introduction by Richard J. Evans.
