= Message of the Non-Jewish Jew =

1958 essay by Isaac Deutscher

- Author: Isaac Deutscher
- Media type: Essay
- Subject: Jewish identity, Secular Jewish culture, Orthodox Judaism, Zionism

Message of the Non-Jewish Jew is a 1958 essay by the Polish-Jewish Marxist Isaac Deutscher. Originally a lecture, Deutscher's speech was later rewritten as an essay featured in the book Non-Jewish Jew and other essays (London: OUP, 1968).

== About ==
The essay coins the term "non-Jewish Jew" to describe himself and other secular Jewish humanists. Deutscher was an atheist from a Hasidic family who valued his Jewish heritage, while rejecting Jewish Orthodoxy and Jewish nationalism. The essay begins with a description of Elisha ben Abuyah, a Jewish heretic from the 2nd century AD who was a friend of Rabbi Meir. Deutscher names Baruch Spinoza, Uriel Acosta, Heinrich Heine, Karl Marx, Leon Trotsky, Sigmund Freud, and Rosa Luxemburg as examples of "non-Jewish Jews".

Deutscher writes: "Religion? I am an atheist. Jewish nationalism? I am an internationalist. In neither sense am I therefore a Jew. I am, however, a Jew by force of my unconditional solidarity with the persecuted and exterminated. I am a Jew because I feel the pulse of Jewish history; because I should like to do all I can to assure the real, not spurious, security and self-respect of the Jews."

The essay was based on a lecture initially delivered in London during the Jewish Book Week to the World Jewish Congress. The text was later revised and extended and published in Universities and Left Review. Summaries of the speech had previously been published by the Jewish Observer and Middle East Review.

== Legacy ==
In 2016, the Jewish-American conservative talk show host Dennis Prager denounced Bernie Sanders as a "non-Jewish Jew", claiming that "If you want to understand Bernie Sanders, this is what you need to know: He is the quintessential modern identity-free man. He is a non-Jewish Jew and a non-American American." Prager also named Noam Chomsky and George Soros as examples of "non-Jewish Jews".

== See also ==
- Anti-Zionism
- Humanistic Judaism
- Jewish left
- Jewish secularism
- Self-hating Jew
