= Bettina Renz =

German political scientist

Academic background
- Education: University of Edinburgh; University of Birmingham
- Thesis: Civil-military Relations in Post-Soviet Russia: The Case of ‘Military Politicians’ (2005)

Bettina Renz is a German political scientist and Professor of International Security at the School of Politics and International Relations, University of Nottingham. Her major research expertise is post-Soviet Russian security and defence policy, military reform and civil-military relations. Since 2005, Renz has published numerous articles in academic journals describing the background and effects of changes in contemporary Russia's military. She is an editorial board member of the United States Army War College Press.

== Education ==
After receiving her MA and MSc in Russian Studies at the University of Edinburgh, Renz went to Centre for Russian and East European Studies, University of Birmingham in 1999 for PhD, which dealt with Russian civil-military relations. She completed her PhD in 2005. In 2006, she was an ESRC Postdoctoral Fellow at the University of Birmingham's European Research Institute.

== Academic career ==
Renz lectured in Defence Studies at King's College London (Royal Air Force College) before being appointed to her current post in 2007. She is a graduate of the King's Institute for Learning and Teaching and is a fellow of the Higher Education Academy. Her teaching interests are in the broad areas of international security and strategic studies.

In 2008, she was the personal tutor of Rizwaan Sabir, a 22-year-old MA student who downloaded al-Qaida-related material for dissertation’s research, and said to the BBC that the police action was a threat to academic freedom.

Renz has previously worked with, guest lectured, or disseminated research findings at the Defence Academy of the United Kingdom, the Royal College of Defence Studies, the Foreign and Commonwealth Office, the Swedish Defence Research Agency, the Norwegian Defence Research Establishment, the Finnish National Defence Academy, and the NATO Defence College in Rome.

During the academic year 2016/17, Renz worked as a Senior Researcher at the University of Helsinki’s Aleksanteri Institute on a project financed by the Finnish government.

In spring 2020, she was a distinguished visiting professor at the Canadian Forces College.

From October 2019 to September 2022, her research with Sarah Whitmore at Oxford Brookes University entitled 'What kind of military does Ukraine want and need? Assessing the importance of strategic and political context for military reforms' was funded by the British Academy.

== Publications ==
=== Books ===
- Russia's Military Revival (2018)
- Russia and Hybrid Warfare-going beyond the Label (2016), with Hanna Smith
- Securitising Russia: The Domestic Politics of Vladimir Putin (2006), with Edwin Bacon and Julian Cooper

=== Selected articles ===
- Renz, B. (2016) Russia and ‘Hybrid Warfare’, Contemporary Politics, 22:3, 283–300.
- Sinovets, P. A., & Renz, B. (2015). Russia's 2014 Military Doctrine and beyond: Threat Perceptions, Capabilities and Ambitions. NATO Defense College.
- Renz, B. (2006) Putin's Militocracy? An Alternative Interpretation of Siloviki in Contemporary Russian Politics, Europe-Asia Studies, 58:6, 903-924
