= Isaac Deutscher =

Polish-British historian and Marxist (1907–1967)

- Born: 3 April 1907; Chrzanów, Austrian Galicia, Austria-Hungary
- Died: 19 August 1967 (aged 60); Rome, Italy
- Citizenship: British (from 1949)
- Occupations: Historian, biographer
- Known for: Studies in Soviet history; biographies of Leon Trotsky and Joseph Stalin
- Spouse: Tamara Deutscher

Isaac Deutscher (Polish: Izaak Deutscher; 3 April 1907 – 19 August 1967) was a Polish Marxist writer, journalist and political activist who moved to the United Kingdom before the outbreak of World War II. He is best known as a biographer of Leon Trotsky and Joseph Stalin and as a commentator on Soviet affairs.

His scholarly biographies of Trotsky and Stalin have received widespread acclaim, with several reviewers ranking his three-volume Prophet biography of Trotsky among the greatest of political biographies; some criticism has been directed at his overly sympathetic tone for the subject matter. His biography of Trotsky was also highly influential among the British New Left in the 1960s and 1970s.

== Early life and communist involvement in Poland ==
Deutscher was born in Chrzanów, a town in the Galicia region of the Austro-Hungarian Empire (now in southern Poland), into a family of religiously observant Jews. He studied with a Hasidic rebbe and was acclaimed as a prodigy in the study of the Torah and the Talmud. He lived through three pogroms in 1918 that followed the collapse of the Austro-Hungarian empire. By the time of his bar mitzvah, however, he had lost his faith. He "tested God" by eating non-kosher food at the grave of a tzadik (holy person) on Yom Kippur. When nothing happened, he became an atheist. Deutscher first attracted notice as a poet, when he began publishing poems in Polish literary periodicals at the age of sixteen. His verse, in Yiddish and Polish, concerned Jewish and Polish mysticism, history and mythology, and he attempted to bridge the gulf between the Polish and Yiddish cultures. He also translated poetry from Hebrew, Latin, German, and Yiddish into Polish.

Deutscher studied literature, history, and philosophy as an extramural student at the Jagiellonian University in Kraków. Soon he left Kraków for Warsaw, where he studied philosophy, economics and Marxism. Around 1927, he joined the illegal Communist Party of Poland (KPP) and became the editor of the party's underground press. He wrote for the Jewish Nasz Przegląd ("Our Review") and for the Marxist Miesięcznik Literacki ("The Literary Monthly"). In 1931 he toured the Soviet Union, seeing the economic conditions under the first Five Year Plan. The University of Moscow and the University of Minsk offered him posts as professor of history of socialism and of Marxist theory, but he declined the offers and returned to Poland. Deutscher co-founded the first anti-Stalinist group in the Communist Party of Poland, protesting the party view that Nazism and social democracy were "not antipodes but twins." This contradicted the then official communist line, according to which social democrats were "social fascists", the greatest enemies of the communist party. In an article "The Danger of Barbarism over Europe", Deutscher urged the formation of a united front of socialists and communists against Nazism. He was expelled from the KPP in 1932, officially for "exaggerating the danger of Nazism and spreading panic in the communist ranks."

== Move to Britain and journalism (1939–1947) ==
In April 1939, Deutscher left Poland for London as a correspondent for a Polish-Jewish newspaper for which he had worked as a proof reader for fourteen years. This move saved his life and paved the way for his future career. He never returned to Poland and never saw any of his family again.

Deutscher had rejected the formation by Trotsky in 1938 of the Fourth International. In England he briefly wrote for, but never joined, the Trotskyist Revolutionary Workers League. He wrote that he "left Warsaw with the crystallised view that the Fourth International was a complete fiasco, that it was degenerating rapidly into an arid sect with which I did not want to be involved." Of the RWL, he wrote: "Although all of its members were sincere and good people, their political thinking was so infantile that it only confirmed me in my view that the Fourth International was a non-starter... Apart from Trotsky himself the Fourth International was a zero."

Germany invaded Poland in September 1939 and Deutscher's connection with his newspaper was severed. He taught himself English and began writing for English magazines. He was soon a regular correspondent for the leading weekly The Economist.

In 1940, he joined the Polish Army in Scotland, but was interned as a dangerous subversive. Released in 1942, he joined the staff of The Economist and became its expert on Soviet affairs and military issues, and its chief European correspondent. He also wrote for The Observer as a roving European correspondent under the pen-name "Peregrine". He was one of the so-called Shanghai Club (named after a restaurant in Soho) of left-leaning and emigre journalists that included Sebastian Haffner (also on The Observer), E. H. Carr, George Orwell, Barbara Ward and Jon Kimche.

He left journalism in 1946–47 to write books. Deutscher's name (with the remark "Sympathiser only") subsequently appeared on Orwell's list, a list of people (including many writers and journalists) which George Orwell prepared in March 1949 for the Information Research Department (IRD), a propaganda unit set up at the Foreign Office by the Labour government. Orwell considered the listed people to have pro-communist leanings and therefore to be inappropriate to write for the IRD. Deutscher became a British subject in 1949, taking his oath of allegiance on 12 May 1949.

== Biographer and academic (1947–1967) ==
Deutscher published his first major work, Stalin: A Political Biography in 1949. In the book he gave Stalin what he saw as his due for building a form of socialism in the Soviet Union, even if it was, in Deutscher's view, a perversion of the vision of Karl Marx, Vladimir Lenin and Leon Trotsky. The Stalin biography made Deutscher a leading authority on Soviet affairs and the Russian Revolution. He followed it up with his most ambitious work, a three-volume biography of Trotsky: The Prophet Armed (1954), The Prophet Unarmed (1959) and The Prophet Outcast (1963). These books were based on detailed research into the Trotsky Archives at Harvard University. Much of the material contained in the third volume was previously unknown, since Trotsky's widow, Natalia Sedova, gave Deutscher access to the closed section of the archives. Deutscher planned to conclude his series with a study of Lenin, but The Life of Lenin remained incomplete at the time of Deutscher's death, partly due to a politically motivated denial of a university position to him. As later revealed, Isaiah Berlin, who was asked to evaluate the academic credentials of Deutscher, argued against such a promotion because of the profoundly pro-communist militancy of the candidate.

In the 1960s, the upsurge of left-wing sentiment that accompanied the Vietnam War made Deutscher a popular figure on university campuses in both Britain and the United States. By this time Deutscher had broken with conventional Trotskyism, although he never repudiated Trotsky himself and remained a committed Marxist. In 1965, Deutscher took part in the first "Teach-In" on Vietnam at the University of California, Berkeley, where thousands of students listened to his indictment of the Cold War. He was G. M. Trevelyan Lecturer at the University of Cambridge for 1966–67 and also lectured for six weeks at the State University of New York. In spring 1967, he guest-lectured at New York University, Princeton, Harvard and Columbia. The G. M. Trevelyan Lectures, under the title The Unfinished Revolution, were published after Deutscher's sudden and unexpected death in Rome in 1967, where he went for an Italian TV broadcast. It was a play about the fall of Trotsky, written and directed by Marco Leto, starring Franco Parenti as Trotsky and Renzo Giovampietro as Stalin. A memorial prize honouring Deutscher, called the Deutscher Memorial Prize, is awarded annually to a book "which exemplifies the best and most innovative new writing in or about the Marxist tradition". In his works Deutscher made the distinction between classical Marxism and vulgar Marxism.

== Relation to Judaism and Zionism ==
Despite being an atheist, Deutscher emphasised the importance of his Jewish heritage. He coined the expression "non-Jewish Jew", to apply to himself and other humanistic Jews. Deutscher admired Elisha ben Abuyah, a Jewish heretic of the 2nd century AD. However, he did not engage in specifically Jewish politics. In Warsaw, he joined the communist party, not the Jewish Bund, whose "Yiddishist" views he opposed. Deutscher wrote: "Religion? I am an atheist. Jewish nationalism? I am an internationalist. In neither sense am I therefore a Jew. I am, however, a Jew by force of my unconditional solidarity with the persecuted and exterminated. I am a Jew because I feel the pulse of Jewish history; because I should like to do all I can to assure the real, not spurious, security and self-respect of the Jews."

Before World War II, Deutscher opposed Zionism as economically retrograde and harmful to the cause of international socialism. But in the aftermath of the Holocaust he regretted his pre-war views, lamenting that "If, instead of arguing against Zionism in the 1920s and 1930s, I had urged European Jews to go to Palestine, I might have helped to save some of the lives that were to be extinguished in Hitler's gas chambers." He argued the case for establishing Israel as a "historic necessity", to provide a home for the surviving Jews of Europe; and said that his anti-Zionism, which "I have, of course, long since abandoned ... was based on a confidence in the European labour movement, or, more broadly, a confidence in European society and civilisation which that society and civilisation have not justified." In the 1960s, he became more critical of Israel for its failure to recognise the dispossession of the Palestinians, and after the Six-Day War of 1967 he demanded that Israel withdraw from the occupied territories. "This six-day wonder", he commented, "the latest, all-too-easy triumph of Israeli arms will be seen one day ... to have been a disaster in the first instance for Israel itself."

Regarding the Israeli–Palestinian conflict, Deutscher wrote the following allegory: "A man once jumped from the top floor of a burning house in which many members of his family had already perished. He managed to save his life; but as he was falling he hit a person standing down below and broke that person's legs and arms. The jumping man had no choice; yet to the man with the broken limbs he was the cause of his misfortune. If both behaved rationally, they would not become enemies. The man who escaped from the blazing house, having recovered, would have tried to help and console the other sufferer; and the latter might have realized that he was the victim of circumstances over which neither of them had control. But look what happens when these people behave irrationally. The injured man blames the other for his misery and swears to make him pay for it. The other, afraid of the crippled man's revenge, insults him, kicks him, and beats him up whenever they meet. The kicked man again swears revenge and is again punched and punished. The bitter enmity, so fortuitous at first, hardens and comes to overshadow the whole existence of both men and to poison their minds."

Deutscher wrote the following passages in "The Israeli Arab War, June 1967" (1967):

"Still we must exercise our judgment and must not allow it to be clouded by emotions and memories, however deep or haunting. We should not allow even invocations of Auschwitz to blackmail us into supporting the wrong cause." (Quoted in Prophets Outcast, p. 184, Nation Books, 2004.)

"To justify or condone Israel's wars against the Arabs is to render Israel a very bad service indeed and to harm its own long-term interest. Israel's security, let me repeat, was not enhanced by the wars of 1956 and 1967; it was undermined and compromised by them. The 'friends of Israel' have in fact abetted Israel in a ruinous course." (Quoted in Prophets Outcast, p. 184, Nation Books, 2004.)

== Personal life ==
Isaac Deutscher married Tamara Frimer (née Lebenhaft) in Hampstead, London, in June 1947. Their son Martin was born in 1950.

== Selected works ==
- Stalin: A Political Biography (1949; expanded edition 1966)
- Soviet Trade Unions: Their Place in Soviet Labour Policy (1950)
- Russia After Stalin (1953; American edition as Russia, What Next?)
- The Prophet Armed: Trotsky, 1879–1921 (1954)
- Heretics and Renegades, and Other Essays (1955)
- Russia in Transition and Other Essays (1957)
- "Message of the Non-Jewish Jew" (1958)
- The Prophet Unarmed: Trotsky, 1921–1929 (1959)
- The Great Contest: Russia and the West (1960)
- The Prophet Outcast: Trotsky, 1929–1940 (1963)
- Ironies of History: Essays on Contemporary Communism (1966)
- Isaac Deutscher on the Israeli-Arab War: An Interview with the Late Isaac Deutscher (1967)
- The Unfinished Revolution: Russia 1917–1967 (1967; G. M. Trevelyan lectures)
- The Non-Jewish Jew and Other Essays (1968; edited by Tamara Deutscher)
- An Open Letter to Władysław Gomułka and the Central Committee of the Polish Workers Party (1968)
- Lenin's Childhood (1970)
- Russia, China, and the West: A Contemporary Chronicle, 1953–1966 (1970; edited by Fred Halliday)
- Marxism in Our Time (1972; edited by Tamara Deutscher)
- Marxism, Wars, and Revolutions: Essays from Four Decades (1984; edited by Tamara Deutscher)
- The Great Purges (1984)

== See also ==
- Deutscher Memorial Prize

== Sources ==
- Caute David. Isaac and Isaiah: The Covert Punishment of a Cold War Heretic (Yale University Press 2013).
- Cliff, Tony, The End of the Road: Isaac Deutscher's Capitulation to Stalinism, 1963.
- Horowitz, David, Isaac Deutscher: The Man and his work. London: Macdonald, 1971.
- Labedz, Leopold Issac Deutscher: Historian, Prophet, Biographer, Survey Volume 30, Issue # 1–2, March 1988.
- Laqueur, Walter The Fate of the Revolution: Interpretations of Soviet History from 1917 to the Present, New York : Scribner, 1987 ISBN 0-684-18903-8.
- Neil Davidson, The prophet, his biographer and the watchtower, International Socialism 104, 2004.
