= R. W. Davies =

British historian (1925–2021)

- Born: Robert William Davies; 23 April 1925; London, England
- Died: 13 April 2021 (aged 95)
- Education: University of London; University of Birmingham
- Scientific career
- Workplaces: University of Birmingham
- Thesis: The development of the Soviet budgetary system, 1917–1941 (1954)
- Doctoral advisor: Alexander Baykov
- Doctoral students: Julian Cooper; Catherine Merridale; Richard Sakwa

Robert William "Bob" Davies (23 April 1925 – 13 April 2021), better known as R. W. Davies, was a British historian, writer and professor of Soviet economic studies at the University of Birmingham.

Obtaining his PhD in 1954, Davies was promoted to full professor and made chair of the Centre for Russian and East European Studies (CREES) at the University of Birmingham in 1965. He retired from active teaching in 1988.

A collaborator and co-author with historian E. H. Carr on two volumes of his 14-volume History of Soviet Russia, Davies is best known for having carried Carr's work forward into the 1930s with seven additional volumes of economic history under the general title The Industrialisation of Soviet Russia.

== Biography ==
=== Early years ===
Davies was educated at the Westcliff High School for Boys in Essex. He joined the Communist Party of Great Britain during the 1930s. During World War II, he served in radio communications in the Royal Air Force from 1943 to 1946. He was stationed in Egypt from 1945 to 1946.

=== Academic career ===
Davies obtained his Bachelor of Arts degree from the School of Slavonic and East European Studies at the University of London in 1950. He subsequently attended the University of Birmingham, where he obtained his PhD in 1954 in Commerce and Social Science under the supervision of the Russian émigré economist Alexander Baykov (1899–1963), a close pre-war associate of Sergei Prokopovich. His interests shifted from Kievan Rus' to history of the Soviet Union under Baykov's influence.

After completing his PhD, Davies was appointed to a post as assistant lecturer at the Institute of Soviet Studies at the University of Glasgow, where he would remain until his return to the University of Birmingham in 1956. He traveled to Moscow for the first time soon after Nikita Khrushchev's On the Cult of Personality and Its Consequences speech of February 1956, and quit the CPGB after the Soviet invasion of Hungary in the autumn of the same year. At Birmingham Davies held a succession of academic titles, including research fellow, lecturer, and senior lecturer. He began his collaboration with E. H. Carr at the latter's invitation in 1958.

In 1963, Davies was named the first director of the Centre for Russian and East European Studies (CREES) at the University of Birmingham — a post which he would retain until 1978 or 1979. He was appointed a professor of Soviet Economic Studies by the University of Birmingham in 1965. He served as a committee member of the National Association for Soviet and East European Studies (NASEES) from 1963 to 1977. He became a supporter of the Labour Party in the 1960s and participated in the Campaign for Nuclear Disarmament. He was an occasional contributor to the New Left Review from the 1980s onwards.

Davies retired in September 1988 and was made senior fellow and emeritus professor at Birmingham upon his departure from active teaching. He was active on the British Academic Committee for Cooperation with Russian Archives (BACCRA) during the 1990s.

His research contributions in Soviet history are recognized by the peers. Davies' papers are housed in the Special Collections department of the University of Birmingham. A temporary register of the Davies' collection, contained in 70 archival boxes, is available.

Davies died in April 2021 at the age of 95.

== Works ==
=== Monographs and edited collections ===
- The Development of the Soviet Budgetary System. Cambridge: Cambridge University Press, 1958.
- Science and the Soviet Economy: An Inaugural Lecture Delivered in the University of Birmingham on 18th January 1967. Birmingham: University of Birmingham, 1967.
- A History of Soviet Russia: Foundations of a Planned Economy, 1926–1929: Volume 1. In Two Parts. With E.H. Carr. London: Macmillan, 1969.
- The Soviet Economic Crisis of 1931–1933. Birmingham: Centre for Russian and East European Studies, 1976.
- The Emergence of the Soviet Economic System, 1927–1934. Birmingham: Centre for Russian and East European Studies, 1977.
- The Technological Level of Soviet Industry. with R. Amann and J.M. Cooper, eds. New Haven, CT: Yale University Press, 1977.
- The Soviet Union. Co-Editor, with Denis J.B. Shaw. London: George Allen & Unwin, 1978
- Soviet Industrial Production, 1928–1937: The Rival Estimates. Birmingham: Centre for Russian and East European Studies, 1978.
- Capital Investment and Capital Stock in the USSR, 1928–1940: Soviet and Western Estimates. Birmingham: Centre for Russian and East European Studies, 1982.
- The Socialist Market: A Debate in Soviet Industry, 1932–33. Birmingham: Centre for Russian and East European Studies, 1982.
- Edward Hallett Carr, 1892–1982. London: British Academy, 1984.
- Materials for a Balance of the Soviet National Economy, 1928–1930. Co-Editor, with Stephen G. Wheatcroft. Cambridge: Cambridge University Press, 1985.
- Soviet Defence Industries During the First Five-Year Plan: Supplement. Birmingham: Centre for Russian and East European Studies, 1987.
- Soviet History in the Gorbachev Revolution: The First Phase. Birmingham: Centre for Russian and East European Studies, 1987.
- Soviet History in the Gorbachev Revolution. Bloomington, IN: Indiana University Press, 1989. ISBN 0-253-31604-9
- Soviet Official Statistics on Industrial Production, Capital Stock and Capital Investment, 1928–41. With J.M. Cooper and M.J. Ilič. Birmingham: Centre for Russian and East European Studies, 1991.
- From Tsarism to the New Economic Policy: Continuity and Change in the Economy of the USSR. Editor. Ithaca, NY: Cornell University Press, 1991.
- The Economic Transformation of the Soviet Union, 1913–1945. Co-Editor, with Stephen G. Wheatcroft. Cambridge: Cambridge University Press, 1994. ISBN 0-521-45152-3
- Soviet History in the Yeltsin Era. London: Macmillan, 1997.
- Soviet Economic Development from Lenin to Khrushchev. Cambridge: Cambridge University Press, 1998. ISBN 0-521-62260-3
- The Industrialisation of Soviet Russia:
  - Volume 1: The Socialist Offensive: The Collectivisation of Soviet Agriculture, 1929–1930. Cambridge, MA: Harvard University Press, 1980.
  - Volume 2: The Soviet Collective Farm, 1929–1930. Cambridge, MA: Harvard University Press, 1980.
  - Volume 3: The Soviet Economy in Turmoil, 1929–1930. Cambridge, MA: Harvard University Press, 1989.
  - Volume 4: Crisis and Progress in the Soviet Economy, 1931–1933. Basingstoke: Macmillan, 1996.
  - Volume 5: The Years of Hunger: Soviet Agriculture, 1931–1933. With Stephen Wheatcroft. Basingstoke: Palgrave, 2004.
  - Volume 6: The Years of Progress: The Soviet Economy, 1934–1936. With Oleg Khlevniuk and Stephen G. Wheatcroft. Basingstoke: Palgrave Macmillan, 2014.
  - Volume 7: The Soviet Economy and the Approach of War, 1937–1939. With Oleg Khlevniuk, Robert W. Harrison and Stephen G. Wheatcroft. London: Palgrave Macmillan, 2018.
- The Stalin–Kaganovich Correspondence, 1931–36. Co-Editor. New Haven, Yale University Press, 2003, ISBN в 0-300-09367-5

=== Articles ===
For an extensive list of articles by R.W. Davies, see Julian Cooper, Maureen Perrie, and E.A. Rees (eds.), Soviet History, 1917–53: Essays in Honour of R.W. Davies. New York: St. Martin's Press, 1995; pp. 264–267.

== Sources ==
- Rees, E.A. (1995), "Introduction: a Tribute to R. W. Davies", in Cooper, Julian; Perrie, Maureen; Rees, E.A. (eds.), Soviet History, 1917–53: Essays in Honour of R. W. Davies, New York: St. Martin's Press, pp. xii–xxiii, doi:10.1007/978-1-349-23939-9
