= E. H. Carr =

British diplomat, historian, and writer (1892–1982)

Edward Hallett Carr CBE FBA
- Born: 28 June 1892; London, UK
- Died: 3 November 1982 (aged 90); London, UK
- Education: Trinity College, Cambridge
- Occupation: Historian · diplomat · International relations theorist · journalist
- Known for: Contributions to classical realism; studies in Soviet history; outlining radical historiographical principles (Historical realism.) in his book What Is History?
- Spouse(s): Anne Ward Howe; Betty Behrens
- Children: 1

Edward Hallett Carr CBE FBA (28 June 1892 – 3 November 1982) was a British English historian, diplomat, journalist and international relations theorist, and an opponent of empiricism within historiography. Carr was best known for A History of Soviet Russia, a 14-volume history of the Soviet Union from 1917 to 1929, for his writings on international relations, particularly The Twenty Years' Crisis, and for his book What Is History? in which he laid out historiographical principles rejecting traditional historical methods and practices.

Educated at Merchant Taylors' School and at Trinity College, Cambridge, Carr began his career as a diplomat in 1916 and in 1919 he participated in the Paris Peace Conference as a member of the British delegation. Becoming increasingly preoccupied with the study of international relations and of the Soviet Union, he resigned from the Foreign Office in 1936 to begin an academic career. From 1941 to 1946, Carr worked as an assistant editor at The Times, where he was noted for his leaders (editorials) urging a socialist system and an Anglo-Soviet alliance as the basis of a post-war order.

== Early life ==
Carr was born in London to a middle-class family, and was educated at the Merchant Taylors' School in London and Trinity College, Cambridge, where he was awarded a first class degree in classics in 1916. Carr's family had originated in northern England, and the first mention of his ancestors was a George Carr who served as the Sheriff of Newcastle in 1450. Carr's parents were Francis Parker and Jesse (née Hallet) Carr. They were initially Conservatives, but went over to supporting the Liberals in 1903 over the issue of free trade. When Joseph Chamberlain proclaimed his opposition to free trade and announced in favour of Imperial Preference, Carr's father, to whom all tariffs were abhorrent, switched his political loyalties.

Carr described the atmosphere at the Merchant Taylors School: "95% of my school fellows came from orthodox Conservative homes, and regarded Lloyd George as an incarnation of the devil. We Liberals were a tiny despised minority." From his parents, Carr inherited a strong belief in progress as an unstoppable force in world affairs, and throughout his life a recurring theme in Carr's thinking was that the world was progressively becoming a better place. In 1911, Carr won the Craven Scholarship to attend Trinity College at Cambridge. At Cambridge, Carr was much impressed by hearing one of his professors lecture on how the Greco-Persian Wars influenced Herodotus in the writing of the Histories. Carr found this to be a great discovery—the subjectivity of the historian's craft. This discovery was later to influence his 1961 book What Is History?

== Diplomatic career ==
Like many of his generation, Carr found the First World War to be a shattering experience as it destroyed the world he had known before 1914. He joined the British Foreign Office in 1916, resigning in 1936. Carr was excused from military service for medical reasons. He was initially assigned to the Contraband Department of the Foreign Office, which sought to enforce the blockade on Germany, and then in 1917 was assigned to the Northern Department, which amongst other areas dealt with relations with Russia. As a diplomat, Carr was later praised by the Foreign Secretary Lord Halifax as someone who had "distinguished himself not only by sound learning and political understanding, but also in administrative ability".

At first, Carr knew nothing about the Bolsheviks. He later recalled of having some "vague impression of the revolutionary views of Lenin and Trotsky" but of knowing nothing of Marxism. By 1919, Carr had become convinced that the Bolsheviks were destined to win the Russian Civil War, and approved of the Prime Minister David Lloyd George's opposition to the anti-Bolshevik ideas of the War Secretary Winston Churchill on the grounds of realpolitik. He later wrote that in the spring of 1919 he "was disappointed when he [Lloyd George] gave way (in part) on the Russian question in order to buy French consent to concessions to Germany". In 1919, Carr was part of the British delegation at the Paris Peace Conference and was involved in the drafting of parts of the Treaty of Versailles relating to the League of Nations. During the conference, Carr was much offended at the Allied, especially French, treatment of the Germans, writing that the German delegation at the peace conference were "cheated over the 'Fourteen Points', and subjected to every petty humiliation".

Beside working on the sections of the Versailles treaty relating to the League of Nations, Carr was also involved in working out the borders between Germany and Poland. Initially, Carr favoured Poland, urging in a memo in February 1919 that Britain recognise Poland at once, and that the German city of Danzig (modern Gdańsk, Poland) be ceded to Poland. In March 1919, Carr fought against the idea of a Minorities Treaty for Poland, arguing that the rights of ethnic and religious minorities in Poland would be best guaranteed by not involving the international community in Polish internal affairs. By the spring of 1919, Carr's relations with the Polish delegation had declined to a state of mutual hostility. Carr's tendency to favour the claims of the Germans at the expense of the Poles led British-Polish historian Adam Zamoyski to note that Carr "held views of the most extraordinary racial arrogance on all of the nations of Eastern Europe". Carr's biographer, Jonathan Haslam, wrote that Carr grew up in a place where German culture was deeply appreciated, which in turn always coloured his views towards Germany throughout his life. As a result, Carr supported the territorial claims of fledgling Weimar Germany against Poland. In a letter written in 1954 to his friend Isaac Deutscher, Carr described his attitude to Poland at the time: "The picture of Poland that was universal in Eastern Europe right down to 1925 was of a strong and potentially predatory power."

After the peace conference, Carr was stationed at the British Embassy in Paris until 1921, and in 1920 was awarded a CBE. At first, Carr had great faith in the League, which he believed would prevent both another world war and ensure a better post-war world. In the 1920s, Carr was assigned to the branch of the British Foreign Office that dealt with the League of Nations before being sent to the British Embassy in Riga, Latvia, where he served as Second Secretary between 1925 and 1929. In 1925, Carr married Anne Ward Howe, by whom he had one son. During his time in Riga (which at that time possessed a substantial Russian émigré community), Carr became increasingly fascinated with Russian literature and culture and wrote several works on various aspects of Russian life. Carr learnt Russian during his time in Riga, to read Russian writers in the original. In 1927, Carr paid his first visit to Moscow. He was later to write that reading Alexander Herzen, Fyodor Dostoyevsky and the work of other 19th-century Russian intellectuals caused him to re-think his liberal views.

Starting in 1929, Carr began to review books relating to all things Russian and Soviet and to international relations in several British literary journals and, towards the end of his life, in the London Review of Books. In particular, Carr emerged as the Times Literary Supplement's Soviet expert in the early 1930s, a position he still held at the time of his death in 1982. Because of his status as a diplomat (until 1936), most of Carr's reviews in the period 1929–36 were published either anonymously or under the pseudonym "John Hallett". In the summer of 1929, Carr began work on a biography of Fyodor Dostoyevsky and, in the course of researching Dostoevsky's life, Carr befriended Prince D. S. Mirsky, a Russian émigré scholar living at that time in Britain. Beside studies on international relations, Carr's writings in the 1930s included biographies of Dostoyevsky (1931), Karl Marx (1934), and Mikhail Bakunin (1937). An early sign of Carr's increasing admiration of the Soviet Union was a 1929 review of Baron Pyotr Wrangel's memoirs.

In an article entitled "Age of Reason" published in the Spectator on 26 April 1930, Carr attacked what he regarded as the prevailing culture of pessimism within the West, which he blamed on the French writer Marcel Proust. In the early 1930s, Carr found the Great Depression to be almost as profoundly shocking as the First World War. Further increasing Carr's interest in a replacement ideology for liberalism was his reaction to hearing the debates in January 1931 at the General Assembly of the League of Nations in Geneva, Switzerland, and especially the speeches on the merits of free trade between the Yugoslav Foreign Minister Vojislav Marinkovich and the British Foreign Secretary Arthur Henderson. It was at this time that Carr started to admire the Soviet Union. In a 1932 book review of Lancelot Lawton's Economic History of Soviet Russia, Carr dismissed Lawton's claim that the Soviet economy was a failure, and praised the British Marxist economist Maurice Dobb's extremely favourable assessment of the Soviet economy.

Carr's early political outlook was anti-Marxist and liberal. In his 1934 biography of Marx, Carr presented his subject as a highly intelligent man and a gifted writer, but one whose talents were devoted entirely to destruction. Carr argued that Marx's sole and only motivation was a mindless class hatred. Carr labelled dialectical materialism gibberish, and the labour theory of value doctrinal and derivative. He praised Marx for emphasising the importance of the collective over the individual. In view of his later conversion to a sort of quasi-Marxism, Carr was to find the passages in Karl Marx: A Study in Fanaticism criticising Marx to be highly embarrassing, and refused to allow the book to be republished. Carr was to later call it his worst book, and complained that he had written it only because his publisher had made a Marx biography a precondition for publishing the biography of Bakunin that he was writing. In his books such as The Romantic Exiles and Dostoevsky, Carr was noted for his highly ironical treatment of his subjects, implying that their lives were of interest but not of great importance. In the mid-1930s, Carr was especially preoccupied with the life and ideas of Bakunin. During this period, Carr started writing a novel about the visit of a Bakunin-type Russian radical to Victorian Britain who proceeded to expose all of what Carr regarded as the pretensions and hypocrisies of British bourgeois society. The novel was never finished or published.

As a diplomat in the 1930s, Carr took the view that great division of the world into rival trading blocs caused by the American Smoot–Hawley Act of 1930 was the principal cause of German belligerence in foreign policy, as Germany was now unable to export finished goods or import raw materials cheaply. In Carr's opinion, if Germany could be given its own economic zone to dominate in Eastern Europe—comparable to the British Imperial preference economic zone, the US dollar zone in the Americas, the French gold bloc zone, and the Japanese economic zone—then the peace of the world could be assured. In an essay published in February 1933 in the Fortnightly Review, Carr blamed what he regarded as a punitive Versailles treaty for the recent accession to power of Adolf Hitler. Carr's views on appeasement caused much tension with his superior, the Permanent Undersecretary Sir Robert Vansittart, and played a role in Carr's resignation from the Foreign Office later in 1936. In an article entitled "An English Nationalist Abroad" published in May 1936 in the Spectator, Carr wrote: "The methods of the Tudor sovereigns, when they were making the English nation, invite many comparisons with those of the Nazi regime in Germany". In this way, Carr argued that it was hypocritical for people in Britain to criticise the Nazi regime's human rights record. Because of Carr's strong antagonism to the Treaty of Versailles, which he viewed as unjust to Germany, Carr was very supportive of the Nazi regime's efforts to destroy Versailles through moves such as the remilitarisation of the Rhineland in 1936. Of his views in the 1930s, Carr later wrote: "No doubt, I was very blind."

== International relations scholar ==
In 1936, Carr became the Woodrow Wilson Professor of International Politics at the University College of Wales, Aberystwyth, and is particularly known for his contribution on international relations theory. Carr's last words of advice as a diplomat were a memo urging that Britain accept the Balkans as an exclusive zone of influence for Germany. Additionally, in articles published in The Christian Science Monitor on 2 December 1936 and in the January 1937 edition of Fortnightly Review, Carr argued that the Soviet Union and France were not working for collective security but rather "a division of the Great Powers into two armored camps", supported non-intervention in the Spanish Civil War, and asserted that King Leopold III of Belgium had made a major step towards peace with his declaration of neutrality of 14 October 1936. Two major intellectual influences on Carr in the mid-1930s were Karl Mannheim's 1936 book Ideology and Utopia, and the work of Reinhold Niebuhr on the need to combine morality with realism.

Carr's appointment as the Woodrow Wilson Professor of International Politics caused a stir when he started to use his position to criticise the League of Nations, a viewpoint which caused much tension with his benefactor, Lord Davies, who was a strong supporter of the League. Lord Davies had established the Wilson Chair in 1924 with the intention of increasing public support for his beloved League, which helps to explain his chagrin at Carr's anti-League lectures. In his first lecture on 14 October 1936 Carr stated that the League was ineffective.

In 1936, Carr began to work for Chatham House, where he chaired a study group tasked with producing a report on nationalism. The report was published in 1939.

In 1937, Carr visited the Soviet Union for a second time, and was impressed by what he saw. During his visit, Carr may have inadvertently caused the death of his friend, Prince D. S. Mirsky. Carr stumbled into Prince Mirsky on the streets of Leningrad (modern Saint Petersburg), and despite Prince Mirsky's best efforts to pretend not to know him, Carr persuaded his old friend to have lunch with him. Since this was at the height of the Yezhovshchina, and any Soviet citizen who had any unauthorised contact with a foreigner was likely to be regarded as a spy, the NKVD arrested Prince Mirsky as a British spy; he died two years later in a Gulag camp near Magadan. As part of the same trip that took Carr to the Soviet Union in 1937 was a visit to Germany. In a speech given on 12 October 1937 at Chatham House summarising his impressions of those two countries, Carr reported that Germany was "almost a free country". Apparently unaware of the fate of Prince Mirsky, Carr spoke of the "strange behaviour" of his old friend, who had at first gone to great lengths to try to pretend that he did not know Carr during their accidental meeting.

In the 1930s, Carr was a leading supporter of appeasement. In his writings on international affairs in British newspapers, Carr criticised the Czechoslovak President Edvard Beneš for clinging to the alliance with France, rather than accepting that it was his country's destiny to be in the German sphere of influence. At the same time, Carr strongly praised the Polish Foreign Minister Colonel Józef Beck for his balancing act between France, Germany, and the Soviet Union. In the late 1930s, Carr started to become even more sympathetic toward the Soviet Union, as he was much impressed by the achievements of the Five-Year Plans, which stood in marked contrast to the failures of capitalism during the Great Depression.

His famous work The Twenty Years' Crisis was published in July 1939, which dealt with the subject of international relations between 1919 and 1939. In that book, Carr defended appeasement on the ground that it was the only realistic policy option. At the time the book was published in the summer of 1939, Neville Chamberlain had adopted his "containment" policy towards Germany, leading Carr to later ruefully comment that his book was dated even before it was published. In the spring and summer of 1939, Carr was very dubious about Chamberlain's "guarantee" of Polish independence issued on 31 March 1939.

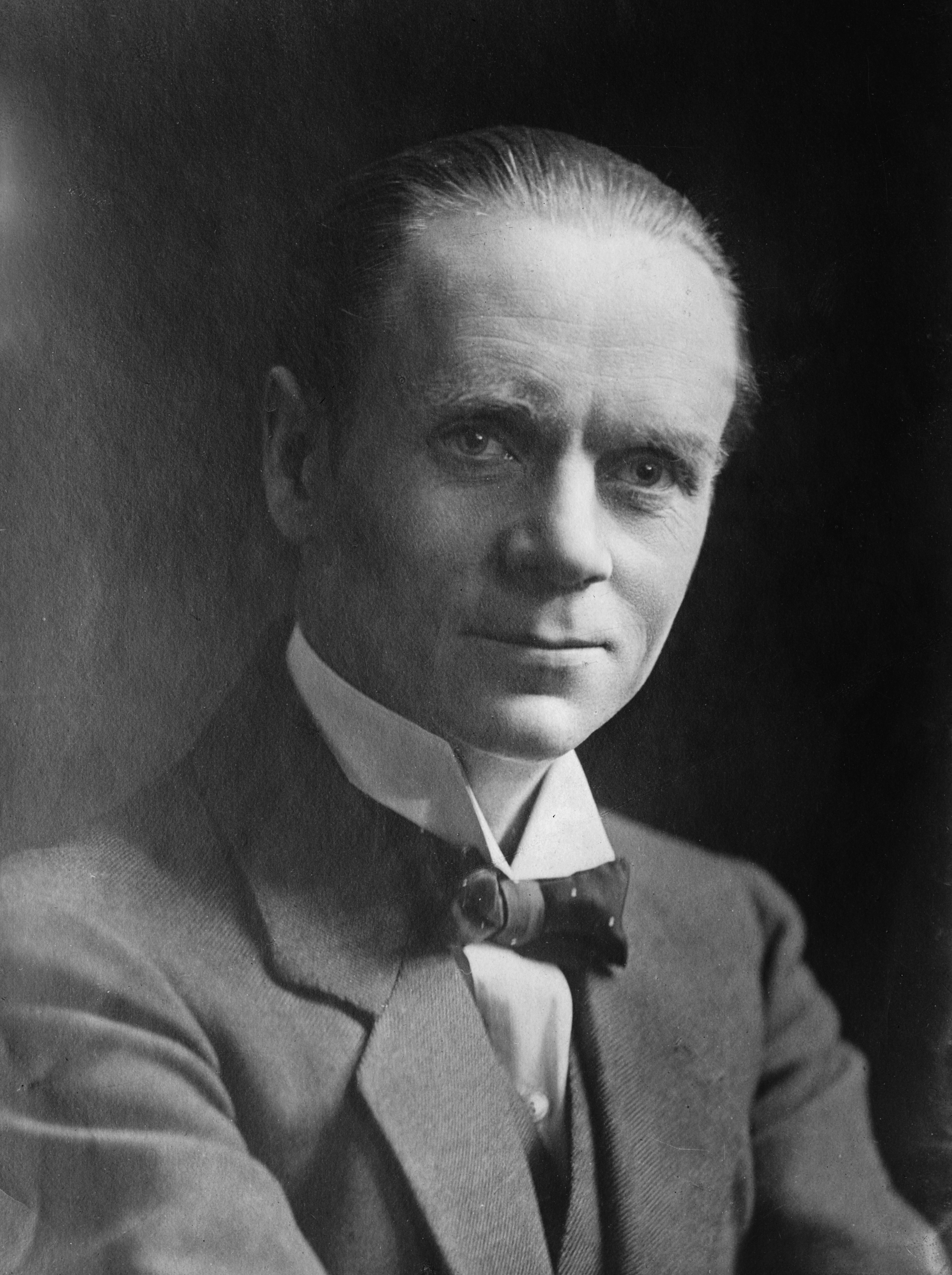
In his 1939 book The Twenty Years' Crisis, Carr attacked Norman Angell as a utopian thinker on international relations.

In The Twenty Years' Crisis, Carr divided thinkers on international relations into two schools, which he labelled the utopians and the realists. Reflecting his own disillusion with the League of Nations, Carr attacked as "utopians" those like Norman Angell who believed that a new and better international structure could be built around the League. In Carr's opinion, the entire international order constructed at Versailles was flawed and the League was a hopeless dream that could never do anything practical. Carr described the opposition of utopianism and realism in international relations as a dialectic progress. He argued that in realism there is no moral dimension, so that for a realist what is successful is right and what is unsuccessful is wrong.

Carr contended that international relations was an incessant struggle between the economically privileged "have" powers and the economically disadvantaged "have not" powers. In this economic understanding of international relations, "have" powers like the United States, Britain and France were inclined to avoid war because of their contented status whereas "have not" powers like Germany, Italy and Japan were inclined towards war as they had nothing to lose. Carr defended the Munich Agreement as the overdue recognition of changes in the balance of power. In The Twenty Years' Crisis, he was highly critical of Winston Churchill, whom Carr described as a mere opportunist interested only in power for himself.

Carr immediately followed up The Twenty Years' Crisis with Britain: A Study of Foreign Policy From The Versailles Treaty to the Outbreak of War, a study of British foreign policy in the inter-war period that featured a preface by the Foreign Secretary, Lord Halifax. Carr ended his support for appeasement, which he had so vociferously expressed in The Twenty Years' Crisis, with a favourable review of a book containing a collection of Churchill's speeches from 1936 to 1938, which Carr wrote were "justifiably" alarmist about Germany. After 1939, Carr largely abandoned writing about international relations in favour of contemporary events and Soviet history. Carr was to write only three more books about international relations after 1939, namely The Future of Nations; Independence Or Interdependence? (1941), German-Soviet Relations Between the Two World Wars, 1919–1939 (1951) and International Relations Between the Two World Wars, 1919–1939 (1955). After the outbreak of the Second World War, Carr stated that he had been somewhat mistaken in his pre-war views on Nazi Germany. In the 1946 revised edition of The Twenty Years' Crisis, Carr was more hostile in his appraisal of German foreign policy than he had been in the first edition in 1939.

Some of the major themes of Carr's writings were change and the relationship between ideational and material forces in society. He saw as a major theme of history the growth of reason as a social force. He argued that all major social changes had been caused by revolutions or wars, both of which Carr regarded as necessary but unpleasant means of accomplishing social change.

== Second World War ==
During the Second World War, Carr's political views took a sharp turn towards the left. He spent the Phoney War working as a clerk with the propaganda department of the Foreign Office. As Carr did not believe that Britain could defeat Germany, the declaration of war on Germany on 3 September 1939 left him highly depressed.

In March 1940, Carr resigned from the Foreign Office to serve as the writer of leaders (editorials) for The Times. In his second leader, published on 21 June 1940 and entitled "The German Dream", Carr wrote that Hitler was offering a "Europe united by conquest". In a leader during the summer of 1940, Carr supported the Soviet annexation of the Baltic States.

Carr served as the assistant editor of The Times from 1941 to 1946, during which time he was well known for the pro-Soviet attitudes that he expressed in his leaders. After June 1941, Carr' s already strong admiration for the Soviet Union was much increased by the Soviet Union's role in defeating Germany.

In a leader of 5 December 1940 entitled "The Two Scourges", Carr wrote that only by removing the "scourge" of unemployment could one also remove the "scourge" of war. Such was the popularity of "The Two Scourges" that it was published as a pamphlet in December 1940, during which its first print run of 10,000 completely sold out. Carr's left-wing leaders caused some tension with the editor of the Times, Geoffrey Dawson, who felt that Carr was taking the Times in too radical a direction, which led to Carr being restricted for a time to writing only on foreign policy. After Dawson was ousted in May 1941 and replaced with Robert M'Gowan Barrington-Ward, Carr was given a free rein to write on whatever he wished. In turn, Barrington-Ward was to find many of Carr's leaders on foreign affairs to be too radical for his liking.

Carr's leaders were noted for their advocacy of a socialist European economy under the control of an international planning board, and for his support for the idea of an Anglo-Soviet alliance as the basis of the post-war international order. Unlike many of his contemporaries in war-time Britain, Carr was against a Carthaginian peace with Germany, and argued for a post-war reconstruction of Germany along socialist lines. In his leaders on foreign affairs, Carr was very consistent in arguing after 1941 that, once the war ended, it was the fate of Eastern Europe to come into the Soviet sphere of influence, and claimed that any effort to the contrary was both vain and immoral.

Between 1942 and 1945, Carr was the Chairman of a study group at the Royal Institute of International Affairs concerned with Anglo-Soviet relations. Carr's study group concluded that Stalin had largely abandoned Communist ideology in favour of Russian nationalism, that the Soviet economy would provide a higher standard of living in the Soviet Union after the war, and that it was both possible and desirable for Britain to reach a friendly understanding with the Soviets once the war had ended. In 1942, Carr published Conditions of Peace, followed by Nationalism and After in 1945, in which he outlined his ideas about how the post-war world should look. In his books, and his Times leaders, Carr urged for the creation of a socialist European federation anchored by an Anglo-German partnership that would be aligned with the Soviet Union against the United States.

In his 1942 book Conditions of Peace, Carr argued that it was a flawed economic system that had caused the First World War and that the only way of preventing another world war was for the Western powers to adopt socialism. One of the main sources for ideas in Conditions of Peace was the 1940 book Dynamics of War and Revolution by the American Lawrence Dennis. In a review of Conditions of Peace, the British writer Rebecca West criticised Carr for using Dennis as a source, commenting: "It is as odd for a serious English writer to quote Sir Oswald Mosley". In a speech on 2 June 1942 in the House of Lords, Viscount Elibank attacked Carr as an "active danger" for his views in Conditions of Peace about a magnanimous peace with Germany and for suggesting that Britain turn over all of her colonies to an international commission after the war.

The next month, Carr's relations with the Polish government were further worsened by the storm caused by the discovery of the Katyn massacre committed by the Russian NKVD in 1940. In a leader entitled "Russia and Poland" on 28 April 1943, Carr blasted the Polish government for accusing the Soviets of committing the Katyn massacre and for asking the Red Cross to investigate.

Lord Davies, who had been extremely unhappy with Carr almost from the moment that Carr had assumed the Wilson Chair in 1936, launched a major campaign in 1943 to have Carr fired, being particularly upset that, although Carr had not taught since 1939, he was still drawing his professor's salary. Lord Davies's efforts to have Carr fired failed when a majority of the Aberystwyth staff, supported by the powerful Welsh political fixer Thomas Jones, sided with Carr.

In December 1944, when fighting broke out in Athens between the Greek Communist front organisation ELAS and the British Army, Carr in a Times leader sided with the Greek Communists, leading to Winston Churchill to condemn him in a speech to the House of Commons. Carr claimed that the Greek EAM was the "largest organised party or group of parties in Greece", which "appeared to exercise almost unchallengeable authority", and called for Britain to recognise the EAM as the legal Greek government.

In contrast to his support for EAM/ELAS, Carr was strongly critical of the legitimate Polish government in exile and its Armia Krajowa (Home Army) resistance organisation. In his leaders of 1944 on Poland, Carr urged that Britain break diplomatic relations with the London government and recognise the Soviet-sponsored Lublin government as the lawful government of Poland.

In a May 1945 leader, Carr blasted those who felt that an Anglo-American "special relationship' would be the principal bulwark of peace. As a result of Carr's leaders, the Times became popularly known during the Second World War as the threepence Daily Worker (the price of the Daily Worker being one penny). Commenting on Carr's pro-Soviet leaders, the British writer George Orwell wrote in 1942 that "all the appeasers, e.g. Professor E. H. Carr, have switched their allegiance from Hitler to Stalin".

Reflecting his disgust with Carr's leaders in the Times, the British civil servant Sir Alexander Cadogan, the Permanent Undersecretary at the Foreign Office, wrote in his diary: "I hope someone will tie Barrington-Ward and Ted Carr together and throw them into the Thames."

During a 1945 lecture series entitled The Soviet Impact on the Western World, which was published as a book in 1946, Carr argued that "The trend away from individualism and towards totalitarianism is everywhere unmistakable", that Marxism was the by far the most successful type of totalitarianism as proved by Soviet industrial growth and the Red Army's role in defeating Germany, and that only the "blind and incurable ignored these trends". During the same lectures, Carr called democracy in the Western world a sham, which permitted a capitalist ruling class to exploit the majority, and praised the Soviet Union as offering real democracy. One of Carr's leading associates, the British historian R. W. Davies, was later to write that Carr's view of the Soviet Union as expressed in The Soviet Impact on the Western World was a rather glossy and idealised picture.

== Cold War ==
In 1946, Carr started living with Joyce Marion Stock Forde, who was to remain his common law wife until 1964. In 1947, Carr was forced to resign from his position at Aberystwyth. In the late 1940s, Carr started to become increasingly influenced by Marxism. His name was on Orwell's list, a list of people which George Orwell prepared in March 1949 for the Information Research Department, a propaganda unit set up at the Foreign Office by the Labour government. Orwell considered these people to have pro-communist leanings and therefore to be inappropriate to write for the IRD. In 1948, Carr condemned the British acceptance of an American loan in 1946 as marking the effective end of British independence. Carr went on to write that the best course for Britain was to seek neutrality in the Cold War and that "peace at any price must be the foundation of British policy". Carr took a great deal of hope from the Soviet–Yugoslav split of 1948.

In May–June 1951, Carr delivered a series of speeches on British radio entitled The New Society, that advocated a commitment to mass democracy, egalitarian democracy, and "public control and planning" of the economy. Carr was a reclusive man whom few knew well, but his circle of close friends included Isaac Deutscher, A. J. P. Taylor, Harold Laski and Karl Mannheim. Carr was especially close to Deutscher. In the early 1950s, when Carr sat on the editorial board of Chatham House, he attempted to block the publication of the manuscript that eventually became The Origins of the Communist Autocracy by Leonard Schapiro on the ground that the subject of repression in the Soviet Union was not a serious topic for a historian. As interest in the subject of Communism grew, Carr largely abandoned international relations as a field of study. In 1956, Carr did not comment on the Soviet suppression of the Hungarian Uprising, while at the same time condemning the Suez War.

In 1966, Carr left Forde and married the historian Betty Behrens. That same year, Carr wrote in an essay that in India, where "liberalism is professed and to some extent practised, millions of people would die without American charity. In China, where liberalism is rejected, people somehow get fed. Which is the more cruel and oppressive regime?" One of Carr's critics, the British historian Robert Conquest, commented that Carr did not appear to be familiar with recent Chinese history, because, judging from that remark, Carr seemed to be ignorant of the millions of Chinese who had starved to death during the Great Leap Forward. In 1961, Carr published an anonymous and very favourable review of his friend A. J. P. Taylor's contentious book The Origins of the Second World War, which caused much controversy. In the late 1960s, Carr was one of the few British professors to be supportive of the New Left student protestors, whom, he hoped, might bring about a socialist revolution in Britain. Carr was elected to the American Philosophical Society in 1967. In 1970, he was elected to the American Academy of Arts and Sciences.

Carr exercised wide influence in the field of Soviet studies and international relations. The extent of Carr's influence could be seen in the 1974 festschrift in his honour, entitled Essays in Honour of E.H. Carr ed. Chimen Abramsky and Beryl Williams. The contributors included Sir Isaiah Berlin, Arthur Lehning, G. A. Cohen, Monica Partridge, Beryl Williams, Eleonore Breuning, D. C. Watt, Mary Holdsworth, Roger Morgan, Alec Nove, John Erickson, Michael Kaser, R. W. Davies, Moshe Lewin, Maurice Dobb, and Lionel Kochan.

In a 1978 interview in New Left Review, Carr called Western economies "crazy" and doomed in the long run. In a 1980 letter to his friend Tamara Deutscher, Carr wrote that he felt that the government of Margaret Thatcher had forced "the forces of Socialism" in Britain into a "full retreat". In the same letter to Deutscher, Carr wrote that "Socialism cannot be obtained through reformism, i.e. through the machinery of bourgeois democracy". Carr went on to decry disunity on the left. Although Carr regarded the abandonment of Maoism in China in the late 1970s as a regressive development, he saw opportunities and wrote to his stockbroker in 1978 that "a lot of people, as well as the Japanese, are going to benefit from the opening up of trade with China. Have you any ideas?"

== History of Soviet Russia ==
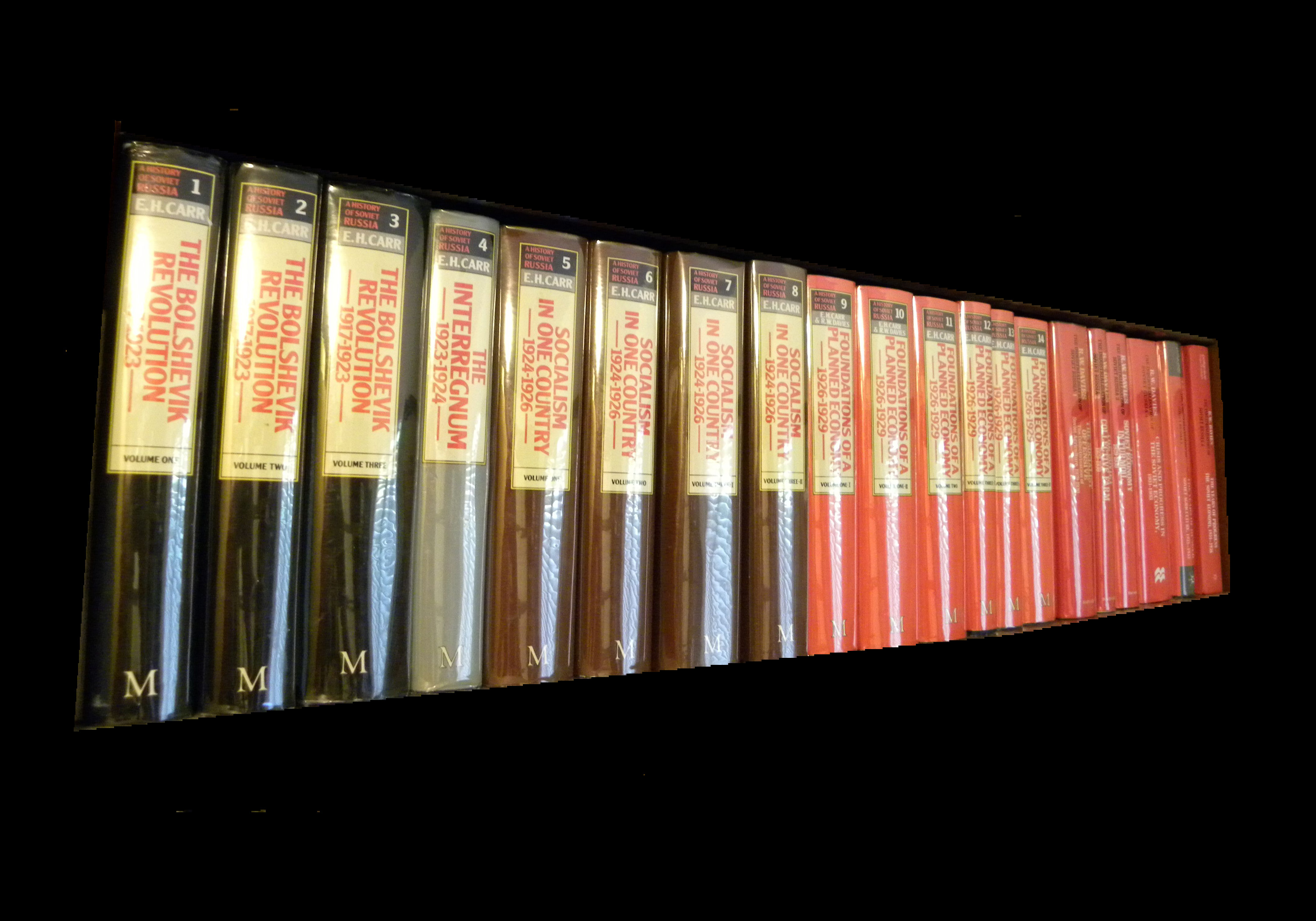
Carr's History of Soviet Russia runs to 14 volumes and has been extended into the 1930s by historian R. W. Davies and others.

After the war, Carr was a fellow and tutor in politics at Balliol College, Oxford, from 1953 to 1955, when he became a fellow of Trinity College, Cambridge, where he remained until his death in 1982. During this period he published most of A History of Soviet Russia as well as What Is History?.

Towards the end of 1944, Carr decided to write a complete history of Soviet Russia from 1917 comprising all aspects of social, political and economic history to explain how the Soviet Union withstood the German invasion. The resulting work, his 14-volume History of Soviet Russia (14 vol., 1950–78), took the story up to 1929. Like many others, Carr argued that the emergence of Russia from a backward peasant economy to a leading industrial power was the most important event of the 20th century. The first part of the History of Soviet Russia comprised three volumes entitled The Bolshevik Revolution, published in 1950, 1952, and 1953, and traced Soviet history from 1917 to 1922. The second part was originally intended to comprise three volumes called The Struggle for Power, covering 1922–28, but Carr instead decided to publish a single volume labelled The Interregnum that covered the events of 1923–24, and another four volumes entitled Socialism in One Country, which took the story up to 1926. Carr's final volumes in the series were entitled The Foundations of the Planned Economy, and covered the years until 1929. Carr had planned to take the series up to Operation Barbarossa in 1941 and the Soviet victory of 1945, but died before he could complete the project. Carr's last book, 1982's The Twilight of the Comintern, examined the response of the Comintern to fascism in 1930–1935. Although it was not officially a part of the History of Soviet Russia series, Carr regarded it as completing it. Another related book that Carr was unable to complete before his death, and was published posthumously in 1984, was The Comintern and the Spanish Civil War.

Another book that was not part of the History of Soviet Russia series, though closely related due to common research in the same archives, was Carr's 1951 German-Soviet Relations Between the Two World Wars, 1919–1939. In it, Carr blamed British Prime Minister Neville Chamberlain for the Molotov–Ribbentrop Pact of 1939. In 1955, a major scandal that damaged Carr's reputation as a historian of the Soviet Union occurred when he wrote the introduction to Notes for a Journal, the supposed memoir of the former Soviet Foreign Commissar Maxim Litvinov that was shortly thereafter exposed as a KGB forgery.

Carr was well known in the 1950s as an outspoken admirer of the Soviet Union. His friend and close associate, the British historian R. W. Davies, was to write that Carr belonged to the anti-Cold-War school of history, which regarded the Soviet Union as the major progressive force in the world, and the Cold War as a case of American aggression against the Soviet Union. The volumes of Carr's History of Soviet Russia were received with mixed reviews. It was "described by supporters as 'Olympian' and 'monumental' and by enemies as a subtle apologia for Stalin".

== What Is History? ==
Carr is also famous today for his work of historiography, What Is History? (1961), a book based upon his series of G. M. Trevelyan lectures, delivered at the University of Cambridge in January-March 1961. In this work, Carr argued that he was presenting a middle-of-the-road position between the empirical view of history and R. G. Collingwood's idealism. Carr rejected as nonsense the empirical view of the historian's work being an accretion of "facts" that he or she has at their disposal. Carr divided facts into two categories: "facts of the past", that is, historical information that historians deem unimportant, and "historical facts", information that historians have decided is important. Carr contended that historians quite arbitrarily determine which of the "facts of the past" to turn into "historical facts", according to their own biases and agendas.

== Contribution to the theory of international relations ==
Carr contributed to the foundation of what is now known as classical realism in international relations theory. Carr's work studied history (work of Thucydides and Machiavelli), and expressed a strong disagreement with what he referred to as Idealism. Carr juxtaposes realism and idealism. Hans Morgenthau, a fellow realist, wrote of Carr's work that it "provides a most lucid and brilliant exposure of the faults of contemporary political thought in the Western world... especially in so far as it concerns international affairs."

== Selected works ==
- Dostoevsky (1821–1881): A New Biography, New York: Houghton Mifflin, 1931.
- The Romantic Exiles: A Nineteenth-Century Portrait Gallery, London: Victor Gollancz, 1933.
- Karl Marx: A Study in Fanaticism, London: Dent, 1934.
- Michael Bakunin, London: Macmillan, 1937.
- International Relations Since the Peace Treaties, London: Macmillan, 1937, revised edition 1940.
- The Twenty Years' Crisis, 1919–1939: an Introduction to the Study of International Relations, London: Macmillan, 1939, revised edition, 1946.
- Britain: A Study of Foreign Policy from the Versailles Treaty to the Outbreak of War, London; New York: Longmans, Green & Co., 1939.
- Conditions of Peace, London: Macmillan, 1942.
- Nationalism and After, London: Macmillan, 1945.
- The Soviet Impact on the Western World, 1946.
- A History of Soviet Russia, London: Macmillan, 1950–1978. Collection of 14 volumes: The Bolshevik Revolution (3 volumes), The Interregnum (1 volume), Socialism in One Country (4 volumes), and The Foundations of a Planned Economy (6 volumes).
- Studies in revolution, London: Macmillan, Abingdon-on-Thames: Routlegde, 1950.
- The New Society, London: Macmillan, 1951.
- German-Soviet Relations Between the Two World Wars, 1919–1939, London: Geoffrey Cumberlege, 1952.
- The October Revolution: Before and After, New York: Alfred A. Knopf, 1969.
- What Is History?, London: Macmillan, 1961; revised edition ed. R.W. Davies, Harmondsworth: Penguin, 1986.
- 1917 Before and After, London: Macmillan, 1969; American edition: The October Revolution Before and After, New York: Knopf, 1969.
- The Russian Revolution: From Lenin to Stalin (1917–1929), London: Macmillan, 1979.
- From Napoleon to Stalin and Other Essays, New York: St. Martin's Press, 1980.
- The Twilight of the Comintern, 1930–1935, London: Macmillan, 1982.
- The Comintern and the Spanish Civil War, New York: Pantheon, 1984.
