= The Twenty Years' Crisis =

International relations book by E. H. Carr

- Author: E. H. Carr
- Publication date: September 1939
- ISBN: 978-0061311222

The Twenty Years' Crisis: 1919–1939: An Introduction to the Study of International Relations is a book on international relations written by E. H. Carr. The book was written in the 1930s shortly before the outbreak of World War II in Europe and the first edition was published in September 1939, shortly after the war's outbreak; a second edition was published in 1946. In the revised edition, Carr did not "re-write every passage which had been in someway modified by the subsequent course of events", but rather decided "to modify a few sentences" and undertake other small efforts to improve the clarity of the work.

In the book, Carr advances a realist theory of international politics, as well as a critique of what he refers to as the utopian vision of liberal idealists (which he associates with Woodrow Wilson). Carr's realism has often been characterized as classical realism. Carr argues that international politics is defined by power politics. He describes three types of power: military power, economic power, and power over opinion. He argues that political action is based on a coordination of morality and power. He also delves into the relationship between power and morality.

== Description ==
The text is considered a classic in international relations theory, and is often dubbed one of the first modern realist texts, following in the fashion of Thucydides, Machiavelli and Hobbes. Carr's analysis begins with the optimism that followed World War I, as embodied in the League of Nations declarations and various international treaties aimed at the permanent prevention of military conflict. He proceeds to demonstrate how rational, well-conceived ideas of peace and cooperation among states were undermined in short order by the realities of chaos and insecurity in the international realm. By assessing the military, economic, ideological, and juridical facets and applications of power, Carr brings harsh criticism to bear on utopian theorists who forget to consider the exigencies of survival and competition.

Carr does not, however, consider the prospect of human improvement a lost cause. At the end of The Twenty Years' Crisis, he actually advocates for the role of morality in international politics, and suggests that unmitigated Realism amounts to a dismal defeatism which we can ill afford. The sine qua non of his analysis is simply that in the conduct of international affairs, the relative balance of power must be acknowledged as a starting point.

He concludes his discussion by suggesting that "elegant superstructures" such as the League of Nations "must wait until some progress has been made in digging the foundations".

== Summary ==
In 1936 Edward Hallett Carr resigned from the Foreign Office to take up the position of Woodrow Wilson Chair in the Department of International Politics at the University College of Wales, Aberystwyth. He began writing The Twenty Years' Crisis under the working title Utopia and Reality.

The book talks about international relations in general but more specifically it is devoted to the interwar period, although the author originally wanted to debunk the pretensions of liberalism while providing a way out of the impasse that was the inter-war crisis. Furthermore, he also wanted to show his criticism towards Woodrow Wilson who used as a slogan the right of national self-determination and Carr considered to be one of the reasons for the crisis during the period between wars. The writer was determined to find a solution or at least an alternative to what was happening, to what he named a "new society based on new social and economic foundations".

The book includes five parts and fourteen chapters in which the first part is dedicated to the study of the science of international politics; a second part that is devoted to seeing the causes and effects of the international crisis between wars; a third part that deals with the concepts of politics, power and morality and the relationship that exists between them; a fourth part specializes on the law as an engine for international change, and, finally, a fifth in which Carr presents his conclusions.

Firstly, Carr gives us the context in which international politics stands on, its science is actually developing its first baby steps, because there was no general desire to take the management of international affairs out of the hands of the experts or even to pay serious and systematic attention to what the professionals were doing. However, the war of 1914-18 ended this form of viewing war as a problem which affects only military experts, therefore, the science of international politics emerged as a response to a very successful popular demand. There was a problem with the method, though. They first collected, classified, and then analysed the facts and made conclusions; after that, they thought they could figure out the purpose for which their facts and deductions could be applied to, but the human mind works the other way around. The author ends up saying that every political judgement helps us to modify the facts and political thought is itself a form of political action. "Political science is the science not only of what is, but what ought to be".

Edward then introduces us to utopianism, which will be present throughout the text, where during the utopian stage of the political sciences the researchers pay little attention to the existing facts or to the analysis of cause and effect, but will commit their time to the elaboration of visionary projects. It is only when these projects break down, and wish or purpose is shown to be incapable by itself of achieving the desired end, that the researchers will reluctantly call in the aid of analysis, and the study; only then it will be regarded as a science. The course of events after 1931 clearly revealed the weaknesses of pure aspiration as the basis for a science of international politics.

At the beginning of his career Carr stuck to the ideas of realism by studying Russian history and became more Marxist oriented, as a result, he manifests the necessity of realism to correct the exuberance of utopianism and later he will establish duel between them. He was both sceptical about the League of Nations considering that any social order implies a large measure of standardization, and therefore of abstraction, which is impossible due to the diverse countries involved; meaning there cannot be a different rule for every member of the community, and he was also critical of the liberal principles as his faith in liberalism received its greatest blow from the collapse of the world economy after 1929.

Carr also discuses how a political society, national or international, cannot exist unless individuals submit to certain standards of conduct, but the problem relies on why we should continue following such rules. Afterwards, he talks about laissez-faire and its relation with the doctrine of the harmony of interests and morality, causing a complex phenomenon known as economic nationalism. Just like how controversial the previous economic doctrine was, the text explores how there is an assumption that every nation has an identical interest in peace and those who violated this principle were considered irrational and immoral.

Later in another chapter, he defines power as a substantial component of politics and an essential tool of the government. He then divides political power into military power, economic power, and power over opinion, which need not be considered separately as they remain intimately involved with each other. The supreme importance of the military instrument lies in the fact that the ultimate ratio of power in international relations is war, additionally, the foreign policy of a country is limited not only by its objectives, but also by its military strengths, becoming an end in itself. In the pursuit of power, military and economic artifacts will be used, however, the art of persuasion is essential for a political leader along with propaganda to obtain power.

Subsequently, Carr describes the differences between municipal law and international law, where this last one lacks a judicature, an executive and a legislature. Following this, he outlines the naturalist and the realist view of law and says that the essence of law is to promote stability and maintain the existing framework of society. The author links shortly after the sanctity of treaties, which were made to protect rights, because not all countries followed the binding character of treaty obligations and therefore created a clause that said that the obligations of a treaty were binding in international law so long as conditions prevailing at the time of the conclusion of the treaty continued. The book also insists on the moral part insisting that there is a moral taint about treaties signed under duress, that is to say, being performed by force, and is referring to the Versailles Treaty. But the insistence on the legal validity of international treaties could also be a weapon used by ruling nations to maintain their supremacy over weaker nations on whom the treaties have been imposed.

The author criticizes morality as many cannot accept the fact that sometimes change needs war. "Without rebellion, mankind would stagnate and injustice would be irremediable". Status quo will not last long and its defence is not always successful, it will most likely end in a war, but there is a probable solution, to establish methods of peaceful change, which is currently the fundamental problem of international morality and of international politics.

Finally, during the interwar period there was a crisis of morality in the framework of international relations which in turn led to a clash of national interests, this also caused that the interests of some countries were ignored. Politics consists of two main elements that cannot be separated from each other, utopia and reality. The conclusions to the book are that the small independent nation-state is obsolete or obsolescent and that no workable international organisation can be built on a membership of a multiplicity of nation-states. In addition, protection of the status quo is not a policy that can be sustainable in the long-term, therefore, the old order cannot be restored, and a drastic change of outlook is unavoidable, therefore, the best hope of progress towards international conciliation seems to lie along the path of economic reconstruction as a repetition of the crisis of 1930-33 would not be tolerated in a near future.

== Responses ==
Since its publication, The Twenty Years' Crisis has been an essential book in the study of international relations. It is still commonly read in undergraduate courses, and the book is considered "one of the founding texts of classical realism". The book has served as the inspiration for numerous other works, such as The Eighty Years' Crisis, a book written by the International Studies Association as a survey of trends in the discipline, edited by Michael Cox, Tim Dunne, and Ken Booth, who write that "many of the arguments and dilemmas in Carr's The Twenty Years' Crisis are relevant to the theory and practice of international politics today", praising the book as "one of the few books in the 80 years of the discipline which leave us nowhere to hide".

The response to Carr has not been entirely positive. Caitlin Blaxton criticized Carr's moral stance in the work as "disturbing". Scholars have also criticized Carr for his presentation of the so-called realist-idealist conflict. According to Peter Wilson, "Carr's concept of utopia ... is not so much a carefully designed scientific concept, as a highly convenient rhetorical device".

Conversely, rather than attempt to critique Carr with the benefit of hindsight, Stephen McGlinchey states that Carr's analysis of events in The Twenty Years Crisis was significant and timely within its context, particularly in its critique of the League of Nations. John Mearsheimer describes it as among the three most influential realist works of international relations of the 20th century. Mearsheimer argues that the book gives a great defense of defensive realism. However, Mearsheimer argues that "there is no theory" in the book: Carr "says little about why states care about power or how much power they want."

The complexities of the text have recently been better understood with a growing literature on Carr, including books by Jonathan Haslam, Michael Cox, and Charles Jones.

== Similar or related works ==
- The Origins of the Second World War by A.J.P. Taylor (1961).
- The Struggle for Mastery in Europe 1848–1918 by A.J.P. Taylor (1954).
- The Third Reich Trilogy by Richard J. Evans (2003, 2005, 2008).
- The Lights that Failed: European International History 1919-1933 by Zara Steiner (2007).
- The Triumph of the Dark: European International History 1933-1939 by Zara Steiner (2011).
