= The Oxford History of Modern Europe =

Comprehensive book series covering the chronological history of modern Europe

The Oxford History of Modern Europe is a series of books on the history of Modern Europe published by the Clarendon Press (an imprint of Oxford University Press) from 1954. The most recent volume appeared in 2022. The series was originally edited by Alan Bullock and F.W.D. Deakin and was intended to cover the period from the French Revolution to the Second World War.

== Books ==
The series comprises a succession of self-contained monographs, usually addressing an individual country or theme. They are, in order of publication:

Author	Title	Release date	Pages	ISBN	Awards
A.J.P. Taylor	The Struggle for Mastery in Europe 1848–1918	1954	638		
Raymond Carr	Spain, 1808–1939	1966; 1982 (2d ed.)	766		
Hugh Seton-Watson	The Russian Empire, 1801–1917	1967	813		
Theodore Zeldin	France, 1848–1945, Vol 1: Ambition, Love and Politics	1973	823	978-0198221043	Won 1974 Wolfson History Prize
Theodore Zeldin	France, 1848–1945, Vol 2: Intellect, Taste and Anxiety	1977	1202	978-0198221258	
E.H. Kossmann	The Low Countries, 1780–1940	1978	793	978-0198221081	
Gordon A. Craig	Germany, 1866–1945	1978	840	978-0198221135	
James J. Sheehan	German History, 1770–1866	1989	986	978-0198221203	
Paul W. Schroeder	The Transformation of European Politics, 1763–1848	1994	916	978-0198221197	Named a Choice Outstanding Academic Book for 1995
Keith Hitchins	Rumania, 1866–1947	1994	587	978-0198221265	Named a Choice Outstanding Academic Book for 1995
David Vital	A People Apart: The Jews in Europe, 1789–1939	1999	962	978-0198219804	
Zara Steiner	The Lights that Failed: European International History 1919–1933	2005	953	978-0198221142	
Richard J. Crampton	Bulgaria	2007	528	978-0199541584	
Paul Bew	Ireland: The Politics of Enmity, 1789–2006	2007	625	978-0198205555	Named a Choice Outstanding Academic Book for 2009; Shortlisted for the 2009 Christopher Ewart-Biggs Memorial Prize
Zara Steiner	The Triumph of the Dark: European International History, 1933–1939	2011	1236	978-0199212002	
David W. Ellwood	The Shock of America: Europe and the Challenge of the Century	2012	598	978-0198228790	
John W. Boyer	Austria 1867-1955	2022	1056	978-0198221296	

== Reception ==
Writing in 2005, David Stevenson observed that the series "belongs to a more leisured era" and noted that no volumes were ever published which deal with Austria, Italy and Soviet Russia. Nonetheless, he observed that "the formula has generated a number of classics, which have remained in print for decades." A volume on Austria was, however, released in 2022.

== See also ==
- The New Cambridge Modern History (1957–1979)
