= The Third Reich Trilogy =

2003–2008 series of history books by Richard J. Evans

The Third Reich Trilogy is a series of three narrative history books by British historian Richard J. Evans, covering the rise and collapse of Nazi Germany in detail, with a focus on the internal politics and the decision-making process. The three volumes of the trilogy – The Coming of the Third Reich, The Third Reich In Power, and The Third Reich at War – were published between 2003 and 2008. The books are illustrated with maps created by András Bereznay.

According to Ian Kershaw, it is "the most comprehensive history in any language of the disastrous epoch of the Third Reich". It has been hailed as a "masterpiece of historical scholarship".

== Books ==
=== The Coming of the Third Reich ===
The first volume, The Coming of the Third Reich, was published by Penguin in the UK in October 2003 (ISBN 978-0-7139-9648-7, 622 pages), and in the US in February 2004 (ISBN 978-1-59420-004-5, 656 pages). It describes the origins of the Nazi Party and the circumstances that led to its gaining control of the Weimar Republic, covering the period from the unification of Germany in 1871 through the First World War and the interwar period to 1933, when Adolf Hitler and the Nazis seized power in Germany.

=== The Third Reich in Power ===
The second volume, The Third Reich in Power, was published by Penguin in the UK and the US in October 2005 (UK: ISBN 978-0-7139-9649-4, 960 pages; US: ISBN 978-1-59420-074-8, 960 pages). It describes how Hitler transformed Germany into a totalitarian dictatorship during the 1930s, picking up where the first volume left off, and ending with the start of World War II in September 1939.

=== The Third Reich at War ===
The third volume, The Third Reich at War, was published by Penguin in the UK in October 2008 (ISBN 978-0-7139-9742-2, 912 pages), and in the US in March 2009 (ISBN 978-1-59420-206-3, 944 pages). It describes the entire wartime period of Nazi Germany, beginning with the invasion of Poland in 1939 and completing the timeline with the end of the war and the defeat and surrender of Nazi Germany in 1945.

== See also ==
- The Origins of the Second World War by A. J. P. Taylor (1961).
- The Twenty Years' Crisis by E. H. Carr (1939).
- The Lights that Failed: European International History 1919-1933 by Zara Steiner (2007).
- The Triumph of the Dark: European International History 1933-1939 by Zara Steiner (2011).
