= The Triumph of the Dark =

European International History 1933–1939 by Zara Steiner

The Triumph of the Dark: European International History 1933–1939
- Book cover
- Author: Zara Steiner
- Language: English
- Series: The Oxford History of Modern Europe
- Subject: History of Europe between the assumption of power by Adolf Hitler to the start of World War II
- Genre: History
- Publisher: Oxford University Press
- Publication date: 2011
- Publication place: United Kingdom
- Media type: Hardcover, Paperback, Kindle
- Pages: 956 pp.
- ISBN: 978-0199226863
- Preceded by: The Lights that Failed: European International History 1919-1933
- Website: Book Website

The Triumph of the Dark: European International History 1933–1939 is the second of two volumes on the political and diplomatic history of Europe between the World Wars (1919 – 1939) and is part of The Oxford History of Modern Europe series.

== Synopsis ==
The central themes of the work are Hitler, his consolidation of power within Central Europe, Germany's Lebensraum and Völkisch movement, Nazi racial policies, and Britain and France's responses to the Nazis' prewar aggression and expansion within Europe.

Steiner also thoroughly explores the two tracks that Britain and France pursued in prewar Europe: appeasing Germany and attempting to build an anti-Nazi alliance. Closely related topics that Steiner explores are anticolonialism and colonial unrest, Italian and Japanese aggression, American and Soviet efforts to influence events and politics in Europe, Stalin's Great Purges, leadership instability in France and Britain, and the Spanish Civil War. Within the context of the failure of democracy to check rising authoritarianism and the struggle of international capitalism to escape the economic malaise caused by the Great Depression, the central figure of the narrative is Hitler, and Steiner takes the reader through the steps taken to bring about armed conflict with Nazism's eastern ideological enemy, Soviet communism, and the sidelining of western ideological enemies in the west. Steiner decisively rejects the historical revisionism that had defined much western understanding of interwar European history.

The book is divided into two parts of roughly equal length. The first part focuses on 1933 to 1938, the retreat from internationalism, and the descent into nationalism in European affairs. The second part focuses on 1938 to 1939, the beginning of overt military aggression by Germany against its neighbors, and Britain and France's flailing attempts to create an international order to oppose Hitler and their simultaneous pursuit of disastrous policies of appeasement. The work concludes with a chronology of international events between 1933 and 1941 and an extensive bibliography of primary and secondary sources.

== Reception ==
- "If it is not the last word on the subject, it will almost certainly become the first place where non-specialists go in search not only of reference material, but also of a broader understanding of the people, events and forces that made these two decades such a fascinating period. As for specialists, they will of course sometimes disagree with some of Steiner's assessments, emphases and shades of grey. But they are likely to come away from the book with a renewed interest in the 1930s as well as an appreciation of just how sophisticated and stimulating international history can be." Talbot Imlay, The English Historical Review.
- "With the second and final volume of her study of European international politics between 1919 and 1939, Zara Steiner has completed what is now the touchstone for several generations and beyond of international historians, international relations specialists, and the wider reading public interested in the period between the two world wars of the 20th century." B.J.C. McKercher, International Journal
- "At times her writing is uneven and the narrative is lost in the detail. Indeed, there are occasional repetitions and some overlaps with the previous volume, and the whole would have benefited from pruning. Yet despite the quibbles and against the odds, the book is a terrifically good read." Piers Brendon, The Independent.

== Reviews ==
=== Academic journals ===
- Fink, Carole (2013). "Review of The Triumph of the Dark: European International History, 1933–1939". Central European History. 46 (2): 437–439. doi:10.1017/S0008938913000794. JSTOR 43280601. S2CID 145281614.
- Imlay, Talbot (2012). "Review of The Triumph of the Dark: European International History, 1933—39". The English Historical Review. 127 (529): 1589–1591. doi:10.1093/ehr/ces300. JSTOR 23362254.
- Link, Stephan J. (2014). "Review of The Triumph of the Dark: European International History, 1933–1939". The Journal of Modern History. 86 (2): 425–427. doi:10.1086/675465. JSTOR 10.1086/675465.
- McKercher, B.J.C. (2012). "Review of The Triumph of the Dark. European International History 1933–1939". International Journal. 67 (2): 562–565. doi:10.1177/002070201206700225. JSTOR 23266031. S2CID 141886004.
- Moravcsik, Andrew (2011). "Review of The Triumph of the Dark: European International History, 1933–1939". Foreign Affairs. 90 (6): 185. JSTOR 23039660.
- Neilson, Keith (2012). "Review of The Triumph of the Dark: European International History, 1933–1939". War in History. 19 (3): 409–412. doi:10.1177/0968344512442034f. JSTOR 26098488. S2CID 163194004.
- Prott, Volker (2014). "Review of The Triumph of the Dark: European International History, 1933–1939". German Politics & Society. 32 (4 (113)): 90–94. JSTOR 43917491.

=== Newspapers and magazines ===
- Brendon, Piers (23 October 2011). "The Triumph of the Dark: European International History 1933–1939, By Zara Steiner". The Independent.

== Release information ==
- Hardcover: 2011 (1st Edition), Oxford University Press, 1248pp. ISBN 978-0199212002. (Note: A Kindle edition (2011) is available)
- Paperback: 2013 (1st Edition), Oxford University Press, 1222pp. ISBN 978-0199676095.

== Series information ==
The Triumph of the Dark is part of the Oxford History of Modern Europe and is the second of two volumes authored by Steiner for the series, the first being The Lights that Failed: European International History 1919-1933. The series is edited by Alan Bullock and William Deakin.

== Similar or related works ==
- The Origins of the Second World War by A.J.P. Taylor (1961).
- The Struggle for Mastery in Europe 1848–1918 by A.J.P. Taylor (1954).
- The Third Reich Trilogy by Richard J. Evans (2003, 2005, 2008).
- The Twenty Years' Crisis by E. H. Carr (1939).

== About the author ==
Zara Steiner (6 November 1928 – 13 February 2020 was an American-born British historian and academic. Steiner specialised in foreign relations, international relations, 20th century history of Europe and of the United States. Richard J. Evans has described her two volumes in the Oxford History of Modern Europe (The Lights That Failed and The Triumph of the Dark) as the "standard works" on international diplomacy between the two world wars. She was elected as a fellow of the British Academy and also served as Acting President of the University of Cambridge.

== See also ==
- Paris Peace Conference (1919–1920)
- Aftermath of World War I
- Interwar period
- International relations (1919–1939)
