= Bismarck: The Man and the Statesman =

Book by A.J.P. Taylor

- First edition
- Author: A. J. P. Taylor
- Language: English
- Subject: Otto von Bismarck
- Publisher: Hamish Hamilton
- Publication date: 1955
- Publication place: United Kingdom
- Media type: Print (hardcover and paperback)
- Pages: 286

Bismarck: The Man and the Statesman is a biography of the German statesman Otto von Bismarck by the English historian A. J. P. Taylor. It was first published in the United Kingdom by Hamish Hamilton in June 1955.

== Origins ==
In a book review written in 1943, Taylor wrote that "to write a life of Bismarck within reasonable compass would be one of the greatest of historical achievements; but perhaps it is impossible. The material is overwhelming; and to make matters worse, Bismarck himself has left, in speeches, conversations or his reminiscences, versions of all the principal events usually deliberately misleading".

Taylor had previously written Germany's First Bid for Colonies 1884-1885: A Move in Bismarck's European Policy and The Struggle for Mastery in Europe 1848–1918, both of which in different ways covered Bismarck's foreign policy. To learn more about his personal life, Taylor read many biographies of Bismarck and a few monographs in French, German and English. He also read Bismarck's memoirs.

He later wrote that the biography was one of the books he had most enjoyed writing: "I knew all the historical background already. Now I found Bismarck's personality fascinating as well and he became one of the few I should like to recall from the dead. It is a very good exercise for an historian to stray into biography - a field seemingly so similar and yet fundamentally different. Perhaps no historian can really handle individual psychology or make an individual the centre of his book. All the same I think my Bismarck is the best on him ever written".

== Contents ==
Taylor's Bismarck is not the Junker and iron Chancellor but a complicated, urban intellectual, "the clever, sophisticated son of a clever, sophisticated mother, masquerading all his life as his heavy, earthen father". Instead of working from a thought out plan for the unification of Germany, Bismarck was an opportunist, taking advantage where he knew he could succeed. An emotional man, Bismarck was able through politics and international relations to gain stability and purpose in life.

== Reception ==
The book was an immediate success, outselling all of Taylor's previous books both in Britain and America.

Harold Nicolson in a review said he enjoyed Taylor's irreverence and his "sharp snaps of paradox". In a review for the New Statesman, the military historian Michael Howard wrote that

Taylor carries out his revaluation in the clear, sharp, epigrammatic prose which makes all his work as stimulating as champagne - and which makes one wonder, sometimes, whether it was all really as simple as that. His mind is a convex mirror in which events appear brilliantly coloured, brilliantly distinct, and sometimes a little distorted. He has many of the virtues of Macaulay, and one or two of his faults. The pattern is too sharply etched; the epigrams are too neat; the judgements are too final; but how refreshing it is to read a historian who is not afraid of patterns, epigrams and judgements!

The American historian of Germany, Gordon A. Craig, believed that "Taylor does two things excellently. He provides a long needed account in English of the main facts of Bismarck's career, an account which is at once readable, up to date...and balanced...In the second place, he paints a fascinating portrait of one of the most complicated personalities in an age which was filled with gifted and original minds...[The] chapter on the corrosive effects of the Bismarckian tradition in Germany's intellectual development is not the least interesting part of this highly provocative study".

Fritz Stern reviewed the book for the Political Science Quarterly and said that while there are many other biographies of Bismarck that are more detailed, "as a perceptive psychological sketch of this massively complex being, Mr. Taylor's Bismarck stands unsurpassed".

A German edition was not published until 1962, and it was not much noticed there. However German historian Wolfgang Mommsen later said that Taylor's biography was better than any German synthesis.
