= The Lights that Failed =

European International History 1919–1933 by Zara Steiner

The Lights that Failed: European International History 1919–1933
- Book cover
- Author: Zara Steiner
- Language: English
- Series: The Oxford History of Modern Europe
- Subject: History of Europe between the end of World War I and the assumption of power by Adolf Hitler
- Genre: History
- Publisher: Oxford University Press
- Publication date: 2007
- Publication place: United Kingdom
- Media type: Hardcover, Paperback, Kindle
- Pages: 956 pp.
- ISBN: 978-0199226863
- Followed by: The Triumph of the Dark: European International History 1933-1939
- Website: Book Website

The Lights that Failed: European International History 1919–1933 is the first of two volumes on the political and diplomatic history of Europe between the World Wars (1919–1939) and is part of the Oxford History of Modern Europe series.

== Synopsis ==
This first volume covers the period from the end of fighting in World War I and the multitude of peace treaties negotiated to end the conflict, to the disintegration of European financial systems as a result of the Great Depression and the rise of Adolf Hitler. Steiner weaves together two distinct threads of interwar historiography, security and economics, to create a "big picture" holistic view of this period of history, covering both great powers and smaller and emerging nations.

Steiner's narrative focuses mainly on the political and economic history of the period and its impact international relations. She focuses on the complex, unforgiving, and often harsh realities of nationalist economic and security policies and how they impacted the relationships between established and emerging European nations. One of Steiner's major contribution to the field of international history is her coverage of the lesser powers of Europe, such as those in Scandinavia and Eastern Europe, which are normally overlooked in works on the period, which are dominated by a great powers narrative and perspective.

The book is structured with two parts of unequal length. The first part of the work is on 1918 to 1929 and focuses on reconstruction of a "shattered" Europe after World War I. The second and shorter part is on what Steiner refers to as the "hinge years" of 1929 to 1933 and focuses on the impact of the Great Depression in Europe, the failure of disarmament as a cornerstone of European security, and the surge of nationalism which upended the European international order. Steiner refers to those years as "hinge year" because she "determined that the doors of Europe that had swung open after the First World War – favouring a reduction of barriers within Europe with regard to the movement of goods, money, people and ideas – slammed firmly shut by 1933." Steiner also covers the impact of the Japanese invasion and occupation of Manchuria on internal and external European relations. The book concludes with a chronology of international events between 1919 and 1933 and an extensive bibliography of primary and secondary sources.

== Academic reception ==
"Among the many virtues of Steiner’s masterly synthetic account are a wide geographic range, with an extensive treatment of Central Europe and the Balkans; a command of the very extensive monographic literature, with judicious summings up and verdicts on the often ferocious microhistoriographical debates; beautiful vignettes of the leading politicians and diplomats; and an ability to bring together the economic and security aspects of European politics." Harold James, Princeton University.

"A magisterial narrative history, thorough, comprehensive, wide-ranging, well organized, cautious, balanced in judgement, objective in tone, and (insofar as any book of this size, complexity, and detail can be) readable."

"Its publication ... emphatically affirms Zara Steiner's status as the pre-eminent historian of inter-war international affairs."

== Academic reviews ==
- Clavin, Patricia (January 2006). "Book review: The Lights That Failed. European International History, 1919–1933". The Institute of Historical Research, the University of London (489).
- Conway, Martin (2006). "Reviewed work: The Lights that Failed: European International History, 1919–1933, Zara Steiner". English Historical Review. 121 (494): 1491–1493. doi:10.1093/ehr/cel313.
- Hoffmann, Stanley (2005). "Reviewed work: The Lights That Failed: European International History, 1919-1933, Zara Steiner". Foreign Affairs. 84 (5): 177. doi:10.2307/20031737. JSTOR 20031737.
- James, Harold (2007). "The Lights That Failed: European International History, 1919–1933. By Zara Steiner. Oxford History of Modern Europe. Edited by Lord Bullock and Sir William Deakin. Oxford: Oxford University Press, 2005". Journal of Modern History. 79 (3): 648–649. doi:10.1086/523217.
- Jeannesson, Stanislas (2006). "Reviewed work: The Lights That Failed: European International History 1919-1933, Zara Steiner". Politique Étrangère. 71 (2): 442–443. JSTOR 42716560.
- Johnson, Gaynor (2006). "Reviewed work: The Lights that Failed: European International History 1919–1933, Zara Steiner". History. 2 (302): 313–314. JSTOR 24427872.
- McKercher, B. J. C. (2007). "Reviewed work: The Lights That Failed: European International History 1919–1933, Zara Steiner". International Journal. 62 (3): 723–725. doi:10.1177/002070200706200321. S2CID 141371871.
- McKercher, B.J.C. (2007). "Review: The Lights That Failed". International Journal: Canada's Journal of Global Policy Analysis. 62 (3): 723–725. doi:10.1177/002070200706200321. S2CID 141371871.
- Overy, Richard (2005). "They Tried; They Failed". Literary Review (323).
- Schroeder, Paul W. (2006). "The Lights That Failed, and Those Never Lit". International History Review. 28 (1): 119–126. doi:10.1080/07075332.2006.9641089. S2CID 154079259.

== Release information ==
- Hardcover: 2005 (1st Edition), Oxford University Press, 938pp. ISBN 978-0198221142. (Note: A Kindle edition (2005) is available)
- Paperback: 2007 (1st Edition), Oxford University Press, 938pp. ISBN 978-0199226863.

== Series information ==
The Lights that Failed is part of the Oxford History of Modern Europe and is the first of two volumes authored by Steiner for the series, the second being the follow-up The Triumph of the Dark: European International History 1933-1939. The series is edited by Alan Bullock and William Deakin.

== Similar or related works ==
- The Origins of the Second World War by A.J.P. Taylor (1961).
- The Struggle for Mastery in Europe 1848–1918 by A.J.P. Taylor (1954).
- The Third Reich Trilogy by Richard J. Evans (2003, 2005, 2008).
- The Twenty Years' Crisis by E. H. Carr (1939).

== About the author ==
Zara Steiner (6 November 1928 – 13 February 2020) was an American-born British historian and academic. Steiner specialised in foreign relations, international relations, 20th century history of Europe and of the United States. Richard J. Evans has described her two volumes in the Oxford History of Modern Europe (The Lights That Failed and The Triumph of the Dark) as the "standard works" on international diplomacy between the two world wars. She was elected as a fellow of the British Academy and also served as Acting President of the University of Cambridge.

== See also ==
- Paris Peace Conference (1919–1920)
- Aftermath of World War I
- Interwar period
- International relations (1919–1939)
