= Paul W. Schroeder =

American historian (1927–2020)

- Born: February 23, 1927; Cleveland, Ohio
- Died: December 6, 2020 (aged 93); State College, Pennsylvania
- Occupations: Historian, Professor
- Organization: University of Illinois Urbana-Champaign

Paul W. Schroeder (February 23, 1927 – December 6, 2020) was an American historian who was professor emeritus at the University of Illinois. He specialized in European international politics from the late 16th to the 20th centuries, Central Europe, and the theory of history. He is known for his contributions to diplomatic history and international relations.

== Biography ==
Schroeder was born in Cleveland, Ohio, the son of Rupert H. Schroeder and Elfrieda Koch. He attended Concordia Seminary (graduated 1951), Texas Christian University, and the University of Texas at Austin, where he received his doctorate in 1958. He received the 1956 Beveridge Award for the best manuscript on American history submitted by a beginning historian. He was an associate professor of history at Concordia Senior College from 1958 to 1963 and was later hired at the University of Illinois.

In the 1972 essay "World War I as a Galloping Gertie", against established historical opinion and Article 231 of the Treaty of Versailles, Schroeder laid the blame for the First World War on Britain's doorstep. Schroeder characterized the political events leading up to the war as a "Galloping Gertie," a metaphor that described political events as escalating out of control and pulling and pushing all five Great Powers into an unwanted war. Schroeder's research highlighted the fact that Britain was engaged in an “encirclement" policy directed at Austria-Hungary. The British policy was not in keeping with the Congress System, which had developed after the Napoleonic Wars, and was fundamentally anti-German and even more anti-Austrian. The policy created an atmosphere in which Germany was forced into a "preventive war" to maintain Austria as an allied power.

Apart from his scholarship, Schroeder was a regular contributor to the magazine The American Conservative and wrote strong critiques of the foreign policy of the George W. Bush administration, especially regarding the Iraq War, for its destabilizing counterproductive effects. The internationalist realist perspective of his critiques fit well with his favorable appraisals of the 19th-century Concert of Europe approach to international relations that he offered as a model in his scholarship. Perry Anderson called him "arguably the greatest living American historian" and said that his The Transformation of European Politics, 1763–1848 "revolutionised one of the most disgraced of all fields in the discipline,... diplomatic history."

== Awards ==
- Albert J. Beveridge Award, American Historical Association, 1956
- Walter Prescott Webb Memorial Prize, 1962
- Finalist, Campus Award for Excellence in Undergraduate Teaching, University of Illinois, 1975
- Queen Prize, University of Illinois, 1980
- Senior University Scholar, University of Illinois, 1989
- British International Studies Association, 1990
- Jubilee Professor, University of Illinois, 1992
- Honorary Doctor of Letters, Valparaiso University, 1993

== Fellowships ==
- Fulbright Scholar in Austria, 1956–1957
- United States Steel Foundation Fellow, 1957–1958
- Senior fellow, National Endowment for the Humanities, 1973
- Senior fellow, American Council of Learned Societies, 1976–1977
- Fellow, Woodrow Wilson International Center for Scholars, 1983–1984
- Visiting research fellow, Merton College, Oxford, 1984
- Jennings Randolph Peace Fellow, United States Institute of Peace, 1992–1993

== Offices ==
- Secretary-treasurer, Conference Group for Central European History, 1967–1968
- Research Division Committee, American Historical Association, 1974–1977
- Adams Prize Committee, American Historical Association, 1974–1977
- Member, advisory council, West European Program of the Woodrow Wilson International Center for Scholars, 1984–92.
- Member, American Committee to Promote the Study of the Habsburg Monarchy, 1983–88.
- Section editor, AHA Guide to Historical Literature.
- Member, advisory council, German Historical Institute Washington, 1995-.

== Publications ==
=== Books ===
- The Axis Alliance and Japanese-American Relations, 1941 (Ithaca, N.Y.: Cornell University Press, 1958).
- Metternich's Diplomacy at Its Zenith, 1820–1823 (Austin, Texas: University of Texas press, 1962). Paperback reprint by University of Texas Press, 1976.
- Austria, Great Britain, and the Crimean War: The Destruction of the European Concert (Ithaca, N.Y.: Cornell University Press, 1972).
- The Transformation of European Politics, 1763-1848. The Oxford History of Modern Europe. Oxford: Clarendon Press. 1994-04-21. ISBN 0198221193.
- Systems, Stability and Statecraft: Essays on the International History of Modern Europe (Palgrave Macmillan, 2004).
- America's Fatal Leap: 1991-2016 (Verso, 2025)
- Stealing Horses to Great Applause: The Origins of the First World War Reconsidered (Verso, 2025)

=== Articles ===
- "Metternich Studies since 1925," Journal of Modern History, 33, (Sept. 1961), 237-66. in JSTOR
- "Austrian Policy at the Congresses of Troppau and Laibach," Journal of Central European Affairs, 22#2 (July 1962), 139-52.
- "Austria as an Obstacle to Italian Unification and Freedom, 1814–1861," Austrian History Newsletter, 1962, 1-32.
- "American Books on Austria-Hungary," Austrian History Yearbook, II (1966), 1972-196.
- "The Status of Habsburg Studies in the United States," Austrian History Yearbook III. Pt. 3 (1967), 267-295.
- "Bruck versus Buol: The Dispute over Austrian Eastern Policy, 1853-1855," Journal of Modern History 40#2 (June 1968), 193-217. in JSTOR
- "Austria and the Danubian Principalities, 1853–1856," Central European History 2#3 (Sept. 1969), 216-36. in JSTOR
- "A Turning Point in Austrian Policy in the Crimean War: the Conferences of March, 1954," Austrian History Yearbook, IV-V (1968–1969), 159–202.
- "World War I as Galloping Gertie: A Reply to Joachim Remak," Journal of Modern History 44, No. 2, (Sept. 1972), 319-344. n JSTOR
- "The 'Balance of Power' System in Europe, 1815–1871," Naval War College Review, March–April 1975, 18-31.
- "Romania and the Great Powers before 1914," Revue Roumaine d'Histoire, XIV, 1 (1975), 39-53.
- "Munich and the British Tradition," The Historical Journal, 19, I (1976), pp. 223–243. in JSTOR
- "Alliances, 1815-1945: Weapons of Power and Tools of Management" in Klaus Knorr, ed., Historical Problems of National Security, (Lawrence, Kansas: Univ. of Kansas Press, 1976), pp. 247–286.
- "Quantitative Studies in the Balance of Power: An Historian's Reaction," and "A Final Rejoinder," Journal of Conflict Resolution 21#1 (March 1977), 3-22, 57-74. in JSTOR
- "Austro-German Relations: Divergent Views of the Disjoined Partnership," Central European History 11#3 (September 1978), 302-312.
- "Gladstone as Bismarck," Canadian Journal of History, XV (August 1980), pp. 163–195.
- "Containment Nineteenth Century Style: How Russia was Restrained," South Atlantic Quarterly, 82 (1983), 1-18.
- "The Lost Intermediaries: The Impact of 1870 on the European System," International History Review, VI (Feb. 1984), 1-27.
- "Oesterreich und die orientalische Frage, 1848–1883," in Das Zeitalter Kaiser Franz Josephs von der Revolution zur Gruenderzeit (Vienna, 1984), Vol. I, 324-28.
- "Does Murphy's Law Apply to History?", The Wilson Quarterly (New Year, 1985), 84-93.
- "The European International System, 1789–1848: Is There a Problem? an Answer?", colloquium paper presented March 19, 1984 at the Woodrow Wilson International Center for Scholars, Smithsonian Institution, Washington, D.C. (52 pp.).
- "The European International System, 1789–1848: Is There a Question? An Answer?", Proceedings of the Consortium on Revolutionary Europe (1985), 1-29.
- "The 19th-Century International System: Changes in the Structure," World Politics 39#1 (October 1986), 1-26. in JSTOR
- "Old Wine in Old Bottles: Recent Contributions to British Foreign Policy and European International Politics, 1789-1848," Journal of British Studies 26, 1 (January 1987), 1-25. in JSTOR
- "Once More, the German Question," International History Review IX, 1 (February 1987), 96-107.
- "The Collapse of the Second Coalition," Journal of Modern History 59, 2 (June 1987), pg. 244-290. in JSTOR
- "An Unnatural 'Natural Alliance': Castlereagh, Metternich, and Aberdeen in 1813," International History Review X, No. 4 (November 1988), 522–540.
- "The Nineteenth Century Balance of Power: Balance of Power or Political Equilibrium?", Review of International Studies (Oxford), 15 (April 1989), 135–153.
- "Failed Bargain Crises, Deterrence, and the International System," in Paul C. Stern et al., eds., Perspectives on Deterrence (New York: Oxford University Press, 1989), 67–83.
- "Germany and the Balance of Power: Past and Present Part I", in Wolf Gruner, ed., Gleichqewicht in Geschichte und Gegenwart (Hamburg: Kramer, 1989), 134–39.
- "Die Habsburger Monarchie und das europaische System im 19t. Jahrhundert," in A. M. Birke and G. Heydemann, eds. Die Herausforderung des europaischen Staatensystems (Göttingen: Vandenhoeck und Ruprecht, 1989). 178–82.
- "Europe and the German Confederation in the 1860s," in Helmut Rumpler, ed., Deutscher Bund und Deutsche Frage 1815-1866 (Vienna, 1990), 281–91.
- The Years 1848 and 1989: The Perils and Profits of Historical Comparisons," in Samuel F. Wells, ed., The Helsinki Process and the Future of Europe (Washington, DC, 1990), 15-21.
- "Review Article. Napoleon Bonaparte," International History Review, XII (May 1990), 324–29.
- "Napoleon's Foreign Policy: A Criminal Enterprise," Journal of Military History 54, No. 2 (April 1990), 147–61.in JSTOR
- "Die Rolle der Vereinigten Staaten bei der Entfesselung des Zweiten Weltkrieges," in Klaus Hildebrand et al., eds., 1939: An der Schwelle zum Weltkrieg (Berlin: de Gruyter, 1990), 215–19.
- "A Just, Unnecessary War: The Flawed American Strategy in the Persian Gulf." ACDIS Occasional Paper, March 1991. 14 pp.
- "The Neo-Realist Theory of International Politics: A Historian's View." ACDIS Occasional Paper, April, 1991. 12 pp.
- "Did the Vienna Settlement Rest on a Balance of Power?". The American Historical Review. 97 (3): 683–706. June 1992. doi:10.2307/2164774. ISSN 0002-8762. JSTOR 2164774.
- "The Transformation of Political Thinking, 1787-1848," in: Jack Snyder and Robert Jervis, eds., Coping with Complexity in the International System (Boulder: Westview Press, 1993), 47-70.
- "'System' and Systemic Thinking in International History," Journal of International History Review xv, 1 (February 1993), 116-34.
- "Economic Integration and the European International System in the Era of World War I," American Historical Review 94, 4 (October 1993), 1130–37. in JSTOR
- "The New World Order: A Historical Perspective" ACDIS Occasional Paper, May, 1994.
- "Historical Reality vs Neo-Realist Theory," International Security 19, 1 (Summer 1994), pp. 108–48. in JSTOR
- "History vs. Neo-realism: A Second Look," International Security, Vol. 20, No. 1 (Summer, 1995), pp. 182–195 in JSTOR
- "Britain, Russia, and the German Question, 1815-1848: Emerging Rivalry or Benign Neglect? ," in Germany and Russia in British Policy towards Europe since 1815, ed. AdolfM. Birke and Hermann Wentker (Munich: K. G. Saur, 1994), 15-30.
- "Balance of Power and Political Equilibrium: A Response," International History Review, 16,4 (1994), 745-54 (the concluding essay in a number of the journal devoted to essays on "Paul W. Schroeder's International System").
- "History and International Relations Theory: Not Use or Abuse, but Fit or Misfit," International Security, Vol. 22, No. 1 (Summer, 1997), pp. 64–74 in JSTOR
- "The Missing Dimension in the Manichaean Trap: A Comment," in The ManichaeanTrap. American Perceptions of the German Empire, 1871-1945, ed. Detlef Junker (Washington, DC: German Historical Institute Occasional Paper No. 12, 1995), 37-47.
- "The Historical Record on Peacekeeping: Grounds for Hope or Pessimism?" in Regional Conflicts and Conflict Resolution, ed. Roger E. Kanet (Urbana, IL: ACDIS, 1995), 149-66. (Also published in Roger E. Kanet, ed., Resolving Regional Conflicts [Urbana, IL., 1998J, pp. 135-52.)
- "Review Article: Can Diplomatic History Guide Foreign Policy?," in International History Review, 28, 2 (May 1996), 358-70.
- "Austria and Prussia, 1813-1848: Pause in the Rivalry or Shift: in the Paradigm? ," in Reich Oder Nation? Mitteleuropa 1780-1815, ed. Heinz Duchhardt and Andreas Kunz (Mainz, 1996),87-104.
- "The Vienna System and Its Stability: The Problem of Stabilizing a State System In Transformation," in Das Europaische Staatensystem 1m Wandel, ed. Peter Kruger (Munich, 1996), 107-22.
- "Making a Necessity of Virtue: The Smaller State as Intermediary Body," Austrian History Yearbook, 29, pt. 1 (1998),1-18.
- "Work with Emerging Forces in the International System," in Just Peacemaking: Ten Practices for Abolishing War, ed. Glen Stassen (Cleveland, OH., 1998), 133-45.
- "A Pointless Enduring Rivalry: France and the Habsburg Monarchy, 1715–1918," in Thompson, William R. (ed.), Great Power Rivalries (Columbia, SC: University of South Carolina Press, 1999)
- "International Politics, Peace, and War, 1815-1914," in The Short Oxford History of Europe: The Nineteenth Century, ed. T. C. W. Blanning (Oxford, 2000),158-209.
- "The Cold War and Its Ending in 'Long-Duration' International History," in Peace, Prosperity and Politics, ed. John Mueller (Boulder, CO., 2001), 257-82.
- "A. J. P. Taylor's International System," International History Review, 28, 1 (March 2001),3-27.
- "The Luck of the House of Habsburg: Military Defeat and Political Survival," Austrian History Yearbook, 32 (2001),215-24.
- "Explaining Peace More than War," in Nation und Europa. Studien zum Internationalen Staatensystem 1m 19. und 20. Jahrhundert, ed. Gabriele Clemens(Stuttgart, 2001), 271-84.
- "The Risks of Victory: An Historian's Provocation," The National Interest (Winter 2001/02),22-36.
- "International History: Why Historians Do It Differently than Political Scientists," in Bridges and Boundaries: Historians, Political Scientists, and the Study of International Relations, ed. Colin Elman and Miriam Fendius Elman (Cambridge, MA., 2001), 403-16.
- "Epilogue: Transformation or Evolution-Linear or Catastrophic? ," in «The Transformation of European Politics, 1763-1848»: Episode or Model In Modern History?, ed. Peter KrUger and Paul W. Schroeder (MUnster, 2002), 323-32.
- "Iraq: The Case Against Preemptive War," The American Conservative (October 2002),8-20.
- "A Papier-Mache Fortress," The National Interest (Winter 2002/03), 125-32. (This review of Philip Bobbitt's book The Shield of Achilles [New York: Knopf 2002] was reprinted in French translation in Commentaire 26, no. 102 [Summer, 2003], 465-72.)
- "Why Realism Does Not Work Well for International History (Whether or Not It Represents a Degenerate IR Research Strategy)," in Realism and the Balancing of Power. A New Debate, ed. John A. Vasquez and Colin Elman (Upper Saddle River, NJ, 2003),114-27.
- "The Transformation of European Politics. Some Reflections", in: Wolfram Pyta and Philipp Menger, eds., Das europäische Mächtekonzert. Friedens- und Sicherheitspolitik vomo Wiener Kongreß 1815 bis zum Krimkrieg 1853 (Köln:Boehlau, 2009), 25–41
- "An Organized Hypocrisy", American Interest, 2016
