= Kobeřice u Brna =

- Municipality
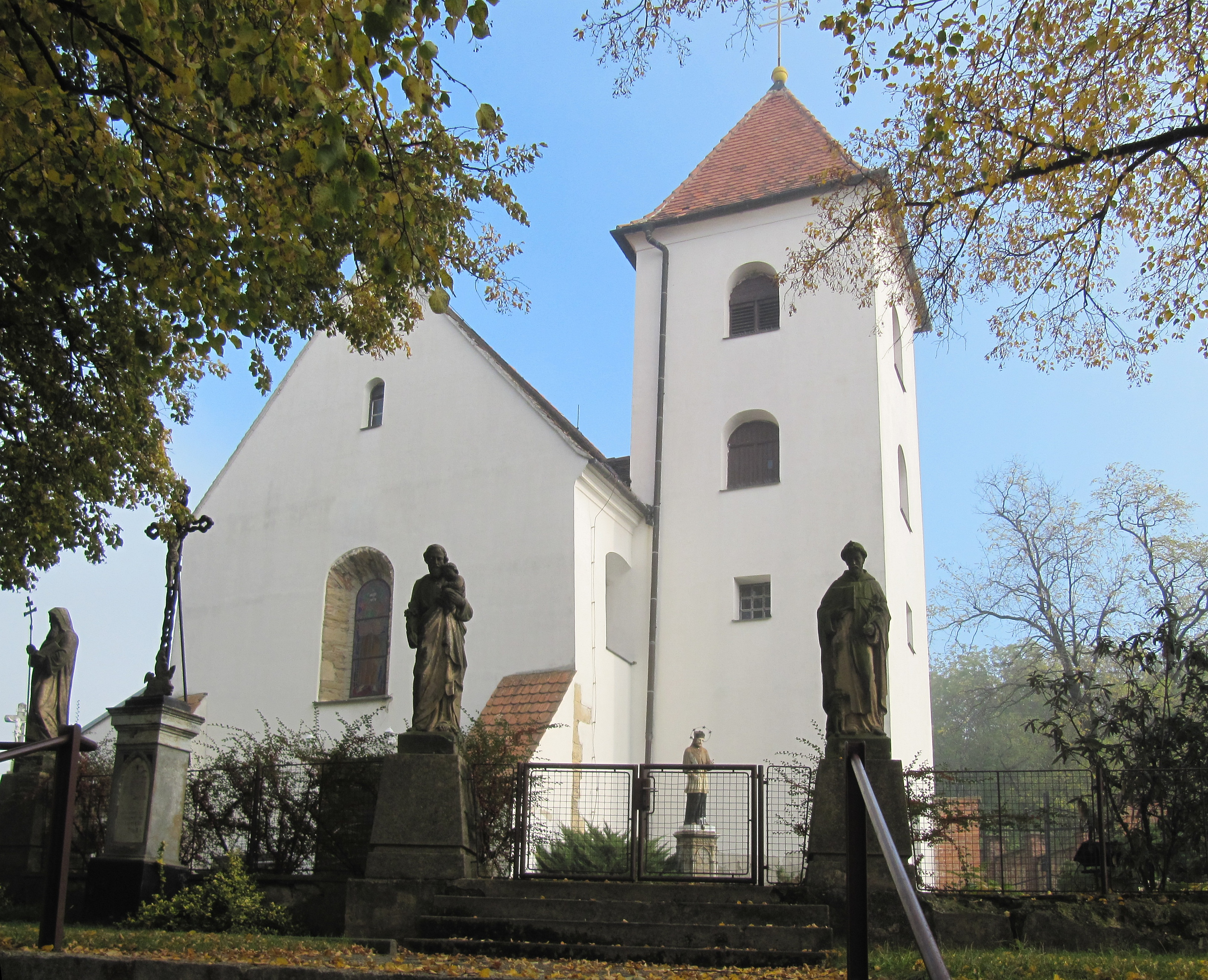
- Church of Saint Giles

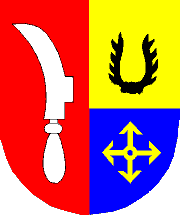
- Flag Coat of arms

- Location in the Czech Republic
- Coordinates: 49°5′32″N 16°53′9″E
- Country: Czech Republic
- Region: South Moravian
- District: Vyškov
- First mentioned: 1283

Area
  - Total: 16.74 km^{2} (6.46 sq mi)
- Elevation: 358 m (1,175 ft)

Population (2026-01-01)
  - Total: 735
  - Density: 43.9/km^{2} (114/sq mi)
- Time zone: UTC+1 (CET)
  - Summer (DST): UTC+2 (CEST)
- Postal code: 684 01
- Website: kobericeubrna.cz

Kobeřice u Brna is a municipality and village in Vyškov District in the South Moravian Region of the Czech Republic. It has about 700 inhabitants.

Kobeřice u Brna lies approximately 22 kilometres (14 mi) south of Vyškov, 24 km (15 mi) south-east of Brno, and 210 km (130 mi) south-east of Prague.

== Demographics ==
Historical population
| Year | Pop. | ±% |
|---|---|---|
| 1869 | 795 | — |
| 1880 | 938 | +18.0% |
| 1890 | 960 | +2.3% |
| 1900 | 989 | +3.0% |
| 1910 | 1,015 | +2.6% |
| 1921 | 979 | −3.5% |
| 1930 | 991 | +1.2% |
| 1950 | 872 | −12.0% |
| 1961 | 816 | −6.4% |
| 1970 | 756 | −7.4% |
| 1980 | 620 | −18.0% |
| 1991 | 512 | −17.4% |
| 2001 | 522 | +2.0% |
| 2011 | 668 | +28.0% |
| 2021 | 712 | +6.6% |
Source: Censuses

== Notable people ==
- Hubert Ripka (1895–1958), politician and historian
