= The Origins of the Second World War =

1961 book by A.J.P. Taylor

- Cover of the first edition
- Author: A. J. P. Taylor
- Language: English
- Subject: Causes of World War II
- Publisher: Hamish Hamilton
- Publication date: 1961
- Publication place: United Kingdom
- Media type: Print (hardcover and paperback)
- Pages: 296

The Origins of the Second World War is a non-fiction book by the English historian A. J. P. Taylor, examining the causes of World War II. It was first published in 1961 by Hamish Hamilton.

== Origins ==
Taylor had previously written The Struggle for Mastery in Europe 1848–1918. As he later wrote in his autobiography:

I wanted to be writing something and decided that I could carry on my diplomatic history from the point where the Struggle for Mastery left off. I had, I thought, done most of the research work needed by reviewing the various books of memoirs and the volumes of German and British diplomatic documents as they came out. At that time no original sources were available: no cabinet minutes or papers, no Chiefs of Staff records, only more or less formal documents from the Foreign Office with very occasional minutes. This extraordinary paucity, as it seems now, makes my book a period piece of limited value. (Note: But a common theme among the book's critics (Trevor-Roper: "ignores essential evidence"; Mason: "based upon a very imperfect knowledge of the economic history", and (in a note) "There are regrettably few references") was that Taylor had neglected sources already available. H W Koch wrote that "it does bear the hallmarks of a rapidly executed intellectual exercise".)

Since 1947, he had read fifteen volumes of British diplomatic documents, eight volumes of German diplomatic documents and one volume of Italian diplomatic documents, all of them covering the 1930s. However, according to Kathleen Burk's biography of Taylor, he did not read Adolf Hitler's Mein Kampf until after writing the book.

Taylor supported the Campaign for Nuclear Disarmament, one of whose arguments was that an unintended war brought about by accident could cause a nuclear war and the end of human civilisation. In Taylor's view, if the Second World War could start by accident, so could a Third. He also was opposed to the idea that it was necessary for the Western powers to take a tough stand against the Soviet Union as failure to take a similar stand against Nazi Germany had led to war.

== Content ==
Since the war, the general view of the causes of the Second World War (the "Nuremberg Thesis") was that Hitler had wanted war, planned in detail for war and had launched the war. He was supported by other Nazis but not by the German people, who were innocent bystanders or victims of the Nazi regime. Taylor broke with this consensus and the five main themes of his book are: first, that foreign policy is determined by reasons of state and the necessity of reacting to foreign threats, rather than driven by internal politics such as economic or ideological factors; second, that Hitler possessed strategic goals but no thought-out grand scheme as to how and when these goals would be achieved; third, that Hitler's goals were the same as those of other German politicians such as Gustav Stresemann; fourth, that Hitler was an opportunist, taking advantage of events provided by the French and British governments, rather than working according to a timetable; and, fifth, that in destroying the Treaty of Versailles and invading Poland, Hitler had the support of the German people.

Reprints and editions from 1962 onward included a preliminary essay entitled 'Second Thoughts'.

== Reception ==
The book was published in April 1961, with German and American editions appearing the following year. Translations also appeared in French, Italian, Finnish, Dutch, Portuguese, Spanish, Norwegian, Danish, Swedish and Sinhalese. It was a bestseller around the world and provoked a storm of controversy.

Sebastian Haffner wrote in his review in The Observer: "This is an almost faultless masterpiece, perfectly proportioned, perfectly controlled. Bitterness has mellowed into quiet sadness and even pity...fairness rules supreme and of all passions only the passion for clarity remains...In spite of all this, it will probably become his most controversial book...Taylor is in the very first rank. He is among English historians to-day what Evelyn Waugh is among English novelists, a rescuer of forgotten truths, a knight of paradox, a prince of story-telling, and a great, perhaps the greatest, master of his craft". In the review from the New Statesman, David Marquand praised Taylor as "the only English historian now writing who can bend the bow of Gibbon and Macaulay". Among his critics were Isaac Deutscher and A.L. Rowse. Martin Gilbert came across a copy of the book in a second hand bookshop some years after it was published. The copy was full of pencilled marginal notes attacking the book's thesis. When Gilbert looked at the flyleaf, it was inscribed "A. L. Rowse". He presented the copy to Taylor, who was much amused.

Hugh Trevor-Roper reviewed the book in the July 1961 issue of the literary magazine Encounter, (Note: Reprinted as Paper 3 in the collection edited by Robertson (see Further reading).) arguing against Taylor's thesis and claiming that Hitler had declared his programme, in outline at least, in Mein Kampf in 1924 and elsewhere. In his review he summarised a number of views which he attributed to Taylor, often quoting from the book or paraphrasing it. He also accused Taylor of perverting the evidence:

I have said enough to show why I think Mr. Taylor's book utterly erroneous. In spite of his statements about 'historical discipline,' he selects, suppresses, and arranges evidence on no principle other than the needs of his thesis; and that thesis, that Hitler was a traditional statesman, of limited aims, merely responding to a given situation, rests on no evidence at all, ignores essential evidence, and is, in my opinion, demonstrably false. This casuistical defence of Hitler's foreign policy will not only do harm by supporting neo-Nazi mythology: it will also do harm, perhaps irreparable harm, to Mr. Taylor's reputation as a serious historian.

On 9 July, Taylor and Trevor-Roper appeared in a televised debate, chaired by Robert Kee, in which the two historians quarrelled. In the September 1961 issue of Encounter, Taylor responded to Trevor-Roper's review. Taylor's article (Note: Reprinted as Paper 4 in the collection edited by Robertson (see Further reading).) was set out in two columns, on the left quoting from the review nine summary views Trevor-Roper attributed to him, on the right providing corresponding passages (identified by Taylor) from the book. Taylor's intent was to demonstrate that Trevor-Roper had selected, suppressed and arranged his evidence in exactly the way he had accused Taylor of doing. The tenth quotation from the review was Trevor-Roper's claim that the book would harm Taylor's reputation; Taylor riposte was that "The Regius Professor's methods of quotation might also do harm to his reputation as a serious historian, if he had one".

A review of the book including the new 'Second Thoughts' essay appeared in the December 1964 issue of Past & Present. (Note: Reprinted as Paper 5 in the collection edited by Robertson (see Further reading).) This review was by the Marxist historian Timothy Mason. Mason pointed to Nazi Germany's "demonic urge" and criticised Taylor for dismissing German economic patterns, such as the importance of rearmament and the objective of achieving autarky. In Mason's view, all these things required Hitler to launch a war: "A war for the plunder of manpower and materials lay square in the dreadful logic of German economic development under National Socialist rule". Taylor had ignored the interdependence of internal and external factors in the aims of German foreign policy.

Taylor's response in the April 1965 issue of Past and Present (Note: Reprinted as Paper 6 in the collection edited by Robertson (see Further reading). It opens with the words "Any author should be grateful for such careful scrutiny as Mr T W Mason has given to my book".) stated that "The evidence for economic or political crises within Germany between 1937 and 1939 is very slight, if not non-existent. Hitler cut German armaments plans by 30 per cent after Munich. He cut them again drastically after the fall of France and was reducing them even after the invasion of Russia. Indeed large-scale rearmament began only in the summer of 1943". Taylor also argued that Mason was wrong in attributing National Socialism to Hitler alone, ignoring the responsibility of the German people, and that National Socialism was the cause of European instability, with Taylor viewing the instability as already present before 1933. Taylor replied to Mason's accusation that Taylor ignored deeper forces at work in the background: "I fear I may not have emphasised the profound forces. Of course there was a general climate of feeling in the Europe of the nineteen-thirties which made war likely...Of course historians must explore the profound forces. But I am sometimes tempted to think that they talk so much about these profound forces in order to avoid doing the detailed work. I prefer detail to generalisations: a grave fault no doubt, but at least it helps to redress the balance".

The press of West Germany had unanimously criticised Taylor's thesis. The historian Elizabeth Wiskemann wrote a letter to The Times Literary Supplement, quoting the many favourable reviews of Taylor's book in neo-Nazi publications. The German historian Golo Mann savaged the book in his review, claiming that Taylor attempted to prove Hitler's innocence and that Taylor was not concerned with historical truth but only in demonstrating the sophistication of his own mind. The German conservative historian Gerhard Ritter was also critical. When Taylor flew to Munich for a televised debate with a Swiss historian, the taxi driver who drove him from the airport asked him whether he knew an Englishman called A.J.P. Taylor. Taylor replied that he was A.J.P. Taylor. The driver stopped mid-traffic, told Taylor he had been part of Hitler's SS bodyguard and put out his hand to congratulate Taylor on proving that Hitler had not caused the war.

The book was published in the United States by Athenaeum Press. At the publisher's suggestion, Taylor added a preface "for the American reader" which explained that his book was "directed solely to the question: why did Great Britain and France declare war on Germany?" (and so did not explore why Hitler invaded Soviet Russia, or Japan attacked Pearl Harbor, or Hitler and Mussolini declared war on the United States). It emphasised America's role in the 1920s, in creating the context for 1930s European diplomacy, despite America's subsequent policy silence.

The reaction to Taylor's thesis was even more extreme than in Britain. The review in Time magazine thundered against Taylor:

Taylor finds excuses for Hitler and reasons to blame nearly everybody else... In Taylor's view it was always somebody else who put poor, passive Hitler in a mood to fight... With scholarly detachment, Taylor states the case for appeasing Hitler and for resisting him, but his sympathies obviously lie with the appeasers... Taylor insists that Hitler was no fanatic. 'Hitler was a rational, though no doubt a wicked statesmen,' writes Taylor primly... [Yet Hitler's] nationalism, far from being the common variety, was the most virulent racism the world has ever known... 'A study of history is of no practical use in the present or future,' Taylor, who likes to be whimsical, once said. As far as Taylor himself is concerned, his book proves his point.

Gordon A. Craig in the New York Herald Tribune condemned the book, calling it a "perverse and potentially dangerous book. Mr. Taylor has always shown a tendency to strain the truth in order to achieve striking formulations. But he has never before been so intent upon demonstrating his originality as he is here, or so willing to indulge in exaggeration, oversimplification, quibbling, and sheer willfulness in order to achieve his effects". Craig ended by saying Taylor "also gives aid and comfort to those who would like to rehabilitate the Fuehrer's reputation".

Two exceptions were American Holocaust denier Harry Elmer Barnes and Murray Rothbard, who both praised Taylor's thesis in the hopes that it would allow future scholars to correct the historical record of the outbreak of hostilities, in a similar manner that occurred after the First World War.

== Attacks on Taylor's arguments ==
- Bell, P. M. H. (1997) [1986]. The Origins of the Second World War in Europe (2nd ed.). London: Pearson. ISBN 978-0-582-30470-3.
- Martel, Gordon, ed. The Origins of the Second World War Reconsidered (London: Allen & Unwin, 1986; second edition, 1999).
- Robertson (ed.). Origins. - see Further reading.

== Similar or related works ==
- The Struggle for Mastery in Europe 1848–1918 by A.J.P. Taylor (1954).
- The Lights that Failed: European International History 1919-1933 by Zara Steiner (2007).
- The Triumph of the Dark: European International History 1933-1939 by Zara Steiner (2011).
- Allies at War by Tim Bouverie (2025)
- The Second World War by Antony Beevor (2012).
- Inferno: The World at War, 1939-1945 by Max Hastings (2011).
- The Storm of War by Andrew Roberts (2009).

== Sources ==
- Burk, Kathleen (2000). Troublemaker: The Life and History of A.J.P. Taylor. London: Yale University Press.
- Sisman, Adam (1995). A.J.P. Taylor: A Biography. London: Mandarin.
- Taylor, A. J. P. (1983). A Personal History. London: Hamish Hamilton.
