= Raymond James Sontag =

American historian (1897–1972)

Raymond James Sontag (1897–1972) was an American historian of European diplomacy of the 19th and 20th centuries.

== Life ==
He was born on October 2, 1897. He received his B.S. and M.A. degrees from the University of Illinois in 1920 and 1921, and his Ph.D. from the University of Pennsylvania in 1924.

He died on October 27, 1972.

== Career ==
He was the Henry Charles Lea Professor of History and then chairman of the history department at Princeton University, 1924–1941. He then moved to the University of California at Berkeley. He was president of the American Catholic Historical Association in 1952. He served as editor in chief for the publication of captured German Foreign Office documents for the U.S. State Department. He was also American editor for “Nazi‐Soviet Relations, 1939–1941.” He was elected to the American Philosophical Society in 1949.

In A Broken World 1919–1939 (1972) Sontag moves far beyond diplomacy/Versailles/Hitler themes and instead looks at Europe in terms of technology—with caused social tensions—and nationalism, which caused conflict between ethnic groups. In the east authoritarian rulers relied on a violent intense nationalism to gain and maintain power, suppress minorities, and stop reform. Everywhere the non-Communist left found it hard to reconcile nationalism and social progress. There was increasing discontinuity as the escalating crises baffled statesmen.

== Bibliography ==
- European Diplomatic History 1871–1932 (1933) online free
- "Appeasement, 1937" Catholic Historical Review 38#4 (1953), pp. 385–396 online
- "The Last Months of Peace, 1939" Foreign Affairs 35, no. 3 (1957), pp. 507–524 pnline
- "The Origins of the Second World War" Review of Politics 25#4 (1963), pp. 497–508 online
- A Broken World 1919–1939 (1972) online free to borrow
- Germany and England: Background of Conflict, 1848-1894 (1972) online free to borrow
- Nazi-Soviet Relations 1939–1941: Documents from the Archives of the German Foreign Office
