= The Course of German History =

1945 book by A. J. P. Taylor

- First edition
- Author: A. J. P. Taylor
- Language: English
- Subject: History of Germany
- Publisher: Hamish Hamilton
- Publication date: 1945
- Publication place: United Kingdom
- Media type: Print (hardcover and paperback)
- Pages: 229

The Course of German History is a non-fiction book by the English historian A. J. P. Taylor. It was first published in the United Kingdom by Hamish Hamilton in July 1945. This influential work offers a critical examination of German history, spanning from the Holy Roman Empire through to the end of World War II, arguing that the course of German history was a natural progression towards militarism and dictatorship. Taylor provocatively suggests that the Nazi regime was an inevitable outcome of German history, rather than an aberration. The book was written during the later stages of World War II and reflects the author's attempt to understand and explain the rise of Adolf Hitler and the National Socialist movement within the broader context of German history. "The Course of German History" has sparked considerable debate among historians and scholars for its deterministic view of history and its controversial interpretations. Despite criticisms, it remains a seminal and widely discussed work in the field of German studies and historiography, noted for its engaging narrative style and its challenge to traditional views on German history.

== Origins ==
In a review of G. P. Gooch's Studies in Diplomacy and Statecraft in 1942, Taylor wrote, "Gooch was a pupil of Acton and a Liberal member of the 1906 Parliament; in both capacities he was convinced of the civilised character of Germany and this influenced all his scholarship. Germany appeared to him a power like any other, with some faults, but more grievances". Taylor believed that by 1942 it was clear that it was not the case and that "the new generation of historians has now the obligation to make a new analysis of the underlying forces in Europe which will be closer to reality and so prepare a British policy which will suffer from fewer illusions and make fewer mistakes".

== Content ==
The book was written in 1944, and published two months after the war with Germany had ended. In the introduction, Taylor wrote the book was a pièce d'occasion and claimed that it was serious history but that but for the war it would not have been written. He argued: "The history of the Germans is a history of extremes. It contains everything except moderation, and in the course of a thousand years the Germans have experienced everything except normality". The "German problem" in Taylor's view had two sides: how can Europe be protected against repeated German aggression, and how can the Germans secure a peaceful form of political existence?

Taylor also noted the repeated failure of the German left to choose a democratic Germany when the choice was between democracy and unity. In his discussion of the revolutions of 1848, Taylor noted:

1848 was the decisive year of German, and so of European, history: it recapitulated Germany's past and inspired Germany's future.... Never has there been a revolution so inspired by a limitless faith in the power of ideas: never has a revolution so discredited the power of ideas in its result. The success of the revolution discredited conservative ideas; the failure of the revolution discredited liberal ideas. After it, nothing remained but the idea of Force, and this idea stood at the helm of German history from then on. For the first time since 1521, the German people stepped on to the centre of the German stage only to miss their cue once more. German history reached its turning-point and failed to turn. This was the fateful essence of 1848.

Taylor criticised all of the main parties in the Weimar Republic. The Social Democrats, "instead of placing the blame for defeat on the old order... they helped the old order back into power and bore the burden of its disaster". The Communists failed to live up to their revolutionary rhetoric: "When, in 1933, the moment came for the Communists to undertake the battle in the streets to which they had so often appealed, it turned out that they were old-style parliamentary talkers like all the rest". Taylor views that the Centre Party was so used to exacting concessions from the government to protect the Catholic Church that they had no power to oppose.

He also attacked the Weimar statesman Gustav Stresemann, who had a reputation in the West for being a "good German": "Even at the moment of the signing of the Treaty of Locarno, which recognised the Franco-German frontier, he declared... that his main purpose in signing was to secure revision of Germany's frontiers to the east. Stresemann agreed with the most extreme Pan-German in striving for German supremacy in Europe and beyond; where he differed from the Pan-Germans was in believing that this supremacy could not be won by military power, but must be achieved by the weight of German industry and the preponderance of German organizing power".

== Reception ==
The book was a success with the public and sold over 6000 copies in the first few months. It received mixed reviews, however.

Lewis Namier reviewed it in the Times Literary Supplement. Namier approved of Taylor's thesis but criticised his style: "His combination of ruggedness and impressionable vivacity renders him also impatient of the careful labour of perfecting and polishing - he discovers precious stones by the handful, and puts them half-cut into circulation.... The basic ideas of Mr. Taylor's book are sound, but would have profited by further careful examination and unfolding... the book should prove of high value in the study of the German problem".

In the journal International Affairs, the reviewer praised the book until 1919 but criticised Taylor's chapters on the interwar years: "It is too facile an attempt to discover some continuity in German history which can compare Charlemagne with Hitler" in their attempts to unite Europe. The reviewer also claimed: "In the effort to make the Nazis, not in large measure the result of this anarchy [the economic crisis], but a normal development, quite to be expected, of German history, Mr. Taylor nearly succeeds in making them respectable."

The American Historical Review remarked: "The profound is mixed with the wisecrack. It has the shortcomings of its virtue. It will shock the scholarly reader but it must challenge him too.... A returning American scholar reports that it challenges equally German historians, some of whom admit that it will make them rethink their modern national history".

The German conservative historian Gerhard Ritter was outraged by the book and wrote to Gooch that during the Third Reich: "German scholars had been ashamed and boiled inwardly at the nonsense written about England, and that no academic historian - as far as I know - had participated. I am correspondingly dismayed and alarmed that even in Oxford, informed history should be displaced in such a high measure by politically motivated history". Gooch replied that Taylor was the only really anti-German British historian and was not to be taken too seriously.

== See also ==
- Sonderweg
