= Hubert Ripka =

Czech politician, journalist, historian and author

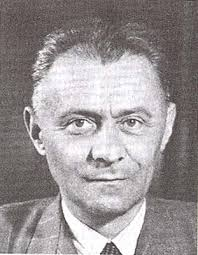
Hubert Ripka

Hubert Ripka (26 July 1895 – 7 January 1958) was a Czech politician, journalist, historian and author.

== Life ==
Ripka was born on 26 July 1895, Kobeřice u Brna, Moravia. The son of a forester, Ripka was the diplomatic correspondent of the Czech newspaper Lidové noviny in the mid-1930s and an adviser to Czechoslovak president Edvard Beneš. An opponent of the Munich Agreement, Ripka moved to France after its signing and wrote Munich: Before and After, an indictment of the events. When France surrendered to German forces in 1940, Ripka moved to England and became Secretary of State in the Ministry of Foreign Affairs in the Czechoslovak government-in-exile. After Germany's defeat in 1945, Ripka returned to Czechoslovakia and took office in the postwar government as Minister for Foreign Trade. He was also a member of the Constituent National Assembly of Czechoslovakia from 1946 to 1948. With the Communist seizure of power in February 1948 Ripka left Czechoslovakia once more, remaining in exile until his death ten years later. He died in London on 7 January 1958.

== Works ==
- "Czechoslovakia: The Key to the Danubian Basin." The Slavonic and East European Review 17.49 (1938): 54–72. online
- Munich: Before and After: A Fully Documented Czechoslovak Account of the Crises of September 1938.... London: Gollancz, 1939
- The Soviet-Czechoslovak treaty. London: Czechoslovak Ministry of Foreign Affairs, Information Service, 1943 – speech delivered before the State council on 15 December 1943
- East and West. London: Lincolns-Prager, c. 1944
- "Czechoslovakia's Attitude to Germany and Hungary." The Slavonic and East European Review 23.62 (1945): 47–54. online
- Czechoslovakia Enslaved: The Story of the Communist Coup d'État. London: Victor Gollancz, 1950 online
- Eastern Europe in the post-war world. Methuen, 1961
