= Zara Steiner =

American-born British historian and academic (1928–2020)

Zara Alice Steiner, FBA (née Shakow; 6 November 1928 – 13 February 2020) was an American-born British historian and academic.

== Biography ==
Born on 6 November 1928 in Manhattan, New York City, Zara Alice Shakow was the daughter of Frances (née Price) and Joseph Shakow. She was of Lithuanian-Jewish descent through her father, who was an outfitter who provided equipment to polar explorers, and her mother was a homemaker. Shakow was a 1948 graduate of Swarthmore College in Pennsylvania and gained bachelor's and master's degrees from the University of Oxford in 1950 (in two years, rather than three) and 1954 respectively. Tutored by both AJP Taylor and Isaiah Berlin, she asked the former to be her doctoral supervisor, but Taylor disapproved of the PhD, which he did not consider worthwhile. She received a doctorate in History from Harvard in 1957.

Steiner specialised in foreign relations, international relations and 20th-century history of Europe and of the United States. Richard J. Evans described her two volumes in the Oxford History of Modern Europe (The Lights That Failed and The Triumph of the Dark) as "standard works" on international diplomacy between both world wars.

From 1968 to 1995, Steiner was a Fellow of New Hall (now Murray Edwards College) of Cambridge University. In 2007, she was elected a Fellow of the British Academy (FBA), the UK's national academy for the humanities and the social sciences.

She married the literary critic and scholar George Steiner in 1955. The couple were introduced by their respective Harvard professors who knew both of them. They had two children. Their son, David Steiner, is executive director of the Johns Hopkins Institute for Education Policy and professor of education at Johns Hopkins University. Their daughter, Deborah Steiner, is a Professor of Classics at Columbia University. George Steiner died on 3 February 2020, and Zara Steiner died from pneumonia at their Cambridge home ten days later, aged 91.

== Selected works ==
- Steiner, Zara S. (1969). The Foreign Office and foreign policy, 1898–1914. Cambridge: University press. ISBN 978-0521076548.
- Steiner, Zara S.; Neilson, Keith (2003). Britain and the origins of the First World War (2nd ed.). Basingstoke: Palgrave Macmillan. ISBN 978-0333734667.
- Steiner, Zara (2005). The Lights that Failed: European international history 1919–1933. Oxford History of Modern Europe. Oxford: Oxford University Press. ISBN 978-0198221142.
- Steiner, Zara (2010). The Triumph of the Dark: European international history 1933–1939. Oxford History of Modern Europe. Oxford: Oxford University Press. ISBN 978-0199212002.
