= A. J. P. Taylor =

English historian (1906–1990)

A. J. P. Taylor FBA
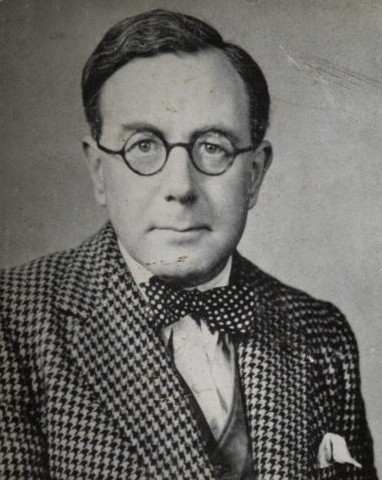
- Taylor c. 1955
- Born: Alan John Percivale Taylor; 25 March 1906; Birkdale, Southport, Lancashire, England
- Died: 7 September 1990 (aged 84); London, England
- Education: Oriel College, Oxford
- Occupation: Historian
- Years active: 1927–1990
- Spouses: Margaret Adams (m. 1931; div. 1951); Eve Crosland (m. 1951; div. 1974); Éva Haraszti (m. 1976)

Alan John Percivale Taylor (25 March 1906 – 7 September 1990) was an English historian who specialised in 19th- and 20th-century European diplomacy. Both a journalist and a broadcaster, he became well known to millions through his television lectures. His combination of academic rigour and popular appeal led the historian Richard Overy to describe him as "the Macaulay of our age". In a 2011 poll by History Today magazine, he was named the fourth most important historian of the previous 60 years.

== Life ==
=== Early life ===
Taylor was born in 1906 in Birkdale, Southport, which was then part of Lancashire, only child of cotton merchant Percy Lees Taylor and schoolmistress Constance Sumner Taylor (née Thompson). In 1919 his family returned to Ashton-on-Ribble, Preston, where both his parents' families had lived for several decades. His wealthy parents held left-wing views, which he inherited. Both his parents were pacifists who vocally opposed the First World War and sent their son to Quaker schools as a way of protesting against the war (his grandmother was from an old Quaker family). These schools included The Downs School at Colwall and Bootham School in York. Geoffrey Barraclough, a contemporary at Bootham School, remembered Taylor as "a most arresting, stimulating, vital personality, violently anti-bourgeois and anti-Christian". In 1924, he went to Oriel College, Oxford, to study modern history. During his time as an undergraduate, in 1925 and 1926, he was the first student to hold the position of secretary of the junior common room.

In the 1920s, Taylor's mother, Constance, was a member of the Comintern while one of his uncles was a founder member of the Communist Party of Great Britain. Constance was a suffragette, feminist and advocate of free love who practised her teachings via a string of extramarital affairs, most notably with Henry Sara, a communist who in many ways became Taylor's surrogate father. Taylor has mentioned in his reminiscences that his mother was domineering, but his father enjoyed exasperating her by following his own ways. Taylor had a close relationship with his father and enjoyed his quirkiness. Taylor himself was recruited into the Communist Party of Great Britain by a friend of the family, the military historian Tom Wintringham, while at Oriel; a member from 1924 to 1926. Taylor broke with that party over what he considered to be its ineffective stand during the 1926 General Strike. After leaving, he was an ardent supporter of the Labour Party for the rest of his life, remaining a member for over sixty years. After leaving the Communist Party he visited the Soviet Union in 1925 and in 1934.

=== Academic career ===
Taylor graduated from Oxford in 1927 with a first-class honours degree. After working briefly as a legal clerk, he began his post-graduate work, going to Vienna to study the impact of the Chartist movement on the Revolutions of 1848. When this topic turned out not to be feasible, he switched to studying the question of Italian unification over a two-year period. This resulted in his first book, The Italian Problem in European Diplomacy, 1847–49 published in 1934.

=== Manchester years ===
Taylor was a lecturer in history in the Victoria University of Manchester from 1930 to 1938. He initially lived with his wife in an unfurnished flat on the top floor of an eighteenth-century house called The Limes, at 148 Wilmslow Road, which was set back from the street, opposite the entrance to Didsbury Park, at the southern end of Didsbury village. A few years later Taylor purchased a house in the village of Disley on the edge of the Peak District.

=== Oxford years ===
He became a Fellow of Magdalen College, Oxford, in 1938, a post he held until 1976. He was also a lecturer in modern history at the University of Oxford from 1938 to 1963. At Oxford he was such a popular speaker that he had to give his lectures at 8:30 a.m. to avoid the room becoming over-crowded.

In 1962, Taylor wrote in a review of The Great Hunger: Ireland 1845–1849 by Cecil Woodham-Smith that: "All Ireland was a Belsen. ... The English governing class ran true to form. They had killed two million Irish people." Taylor added that if the death rate from the Great Famine was not higher it "was not for want of trying" on the part of the British government, quoting Benjamin Jowett, the Master of Balliol College: "I have always felt a certain horror of political economists since I heard one of them say that the Famine in Ireland would not kill more than a million people, and that would scarcely be enough to do much good." Taylor later reprinted his book review under the stark title "Genocide" in his 1976 book Essays in English History."

In 1964, whilst he retained his college fellowship, the University of Oxford declined to renew Taylor's appointment as a university lecturer in modern history. This apparently sudden decision came in the aftermath of the controversy around his book The Origins of the Second World War. Moving to London, he became a lecturer at the Institute of Historical Research at University College London and at the Polytechnic of North London.

An important step in Taylor's "rehabilitation" was a festschrift organised in his honour by Martin Gilbert in 1965. He was honoured with two more festschriften, in 1976 and 1986. The festschriften were testaments to his popularity with his former students as receiving even a single festschrift is considered to be an extraordinary and rare honour.

=== Second World War ===
During the Second World War, Taylor served in the Home Guard and befriended émigré statesmen from Central Europe, such as the former Hungarian President Count Mihály Károlyi and Czechoslovak President Edvard Beneš. These friendships helped to enhance his understanding of the region. His friendship with Beneš and Károlyi may help explain his sympathetic portrayal of them, in particular Károlyi, whom Taylor portrayed as a saintly figure. Taylor became friends with Hubert Ripka, the press attache for Beneš, who lived in Oxford. Through him, he got to know President Beneš who lived in London. Taylor wrote that because Beneš was a President, "he was not allowed to brave the front line in London and had to live in a sovereign state at Aston Abbotts – a Rothschild house of, for them, a modest standard. Bored and isolated, Beneš summoned an audience whatever he could and I was often swept over to Aston Abbots in the presidential car".

In 1943, Taylor wrote his first pamphlet, Czechoslovakia's Place in a Free Europe, explaining his view that Czechoslovakia would after the war serve as a "bridge" between the Western world and the Soviet Union. Czechoslovakia's Place in a Free Europe began as a lecture Taylor had given at the Czechoslovak Institute in London on 29 April 1943 and at the suggestion of Jan Masaryk was turned into a pamphlet to explain Czechoslovakia's situation to the British people. Taylor argued that the Czechoslovaks would have to "explain" democracy to the Soviets and "explain" socialism to the British, saying: "You must appear to the English people as communists and to the Russians as democrats and therefore receive nothing, but abuse from both sides Czechoslovakia's Place in a Free Europe reflected Beneš's theory of "convergence" as he felt based on what he was seeing in wartime Britain that the western nations would become socialist after the war while the Soviet Union would become more democratic. In 1945, Taylor wrote: "Beck, Stojadinović, Antonescu and Bonnet despised [Beneš's] integrity and prided themselves on their cunning; but their countries, too, fell before the German aggressor and every step they took has made the resurrection of their countries more difficult. [In contrast] the foreign policy of Dr. Beneš during the present war has won for Czechoslovakia a secure future." During the same period, Taylor was employed by the Political Warfare Executive as an expert on Central Europe and frequently spoke on the radio and at various public meetings. During the war, he lobbied for British recognition of Josip Broz Tito's Partisans as the legitimate government of Yugoslavia.

=== Resignation from British Academy ===
In 1979, Taylor resigned in protest from the British Academy over its dismissal of Anthony Blunt, who had been exposed as a Soviet spy. Taylor took the position that:

It's none of our business, as a group of scholars, to consider matters of this sort. The academy's only concern should be his scholarly credentials, which are unaffected by all this.

=== Personal life ===
Taylor married three times. He married his first wife Margaret Adams in 1931. They had four children and divorced in 1951. For some time in the 1930s, he and his wife shared a house with the writer Malcolm Muggeridge and his wife Kitty. From the 1940s Margaret's infatuations with Robert Kee and Dylan Thomas pushed the couple towards separation. His second wife was Eve Crosland, the sister of Anthony Crosland MP, whom Taylor married in 1951; they had two children and divorced in 1974. His third wife was the Hungarian historian Éva Haraszti. They married in 1976.

== Work ==
=== The Italian Problem in European Diplomacy, 1847–49 ===
Taylor's first book, published in 1934, addressed the question of Italian unification The Italian Problem in European Diplomacy, 1847–49. However, Taylor's speciality was in Central European, British and diplomatic history. He was especially interested in the Habsburg dynasty and Bismarck. His main mentors in this period were the Austrian-born historian Alfred Francis Pribram and the Polish-born historian Sir Lewis Namier. Taylor's earlier writings reflected Pribram's favourable opinion of the Habsburgs; however, his 1941 book The Habsburg Monarchy 1809–1918 (published in a revised edition in 1948) showed the influence of Namier's unfavourable views. In The Habsburg Monarchy, Taylor stated that the Habsburgs saw their realms entirely as a tool for foreign policy and thus could never build a genuine nation-state. To hold their realm together, they resorted to playing one ethnic group off against another and promoted German and Magyar hegemony over the other ethnic groups in Austria-Hungary.

=== The Struggle for Mastery in Europe 1848–1918 ===
In 1954 he published his masterpiece, The Struggle for Mastery in Europe 1848–1918, and followed it up with The Trouble Makers in 1957, a critical study of British foreign policy. The Trouble Makers was a celebration of those who had criticised the government over foreign policy, a subject dear to his heart. The Trouble Makers had originally been the Ford Lectures in 1955 and was his favourite book by far. When invited to deliver the Ford Lectures, he was initially at a loss for a topic; and it was his friend Alan Bullock who suggested the topic of foreign policy dissent.

=== Bismarck: The Man and the Statesman ===
The recurring theme of accidents deciding history appeared in Taylor's best-selling 1955 biography of Bismarck. Taylor controversially argued that the Iron Chancellor had unified Germany more by accident than by design; a theory that contradicted those put forward by the historians Heinrich von Sybel, Leopold von Ranke and Heinrich von Treitschke in the latter years of the 19th century and by other historians more recently.

=== The Origins of the Second World War ===
In 1961, he published his most controversial book, The Origins of the Second World War, which earned him a reputation as a revisionist. Gordon Martel notes that "it made a profound impact. The book became a classic and a central point of reference in all discussion on the Second World War."

In the book Taylor argued against the widespread belief that the outbreak of the Second World War (specifically between Germany, Poland, the United Kingdom and France, September 1939) was the result of an intentional plan on the part of Adolf Hitler. He began his book with the statement that too many people have accepted uncritically what he called the "Nuremberg Thesis", that the Second World War was the result of criminal conspiracy by a small gang comprising Hitler and his associates. He regarded the "Nuremberg Thesis" as too convenient for too many people and held that it shielded the blame for the war from the leaders of other states, let the German people avoid any responsibility for the war and created a situation where West Germany was a respectable Cold War ally against the Soviets.

Taylor's thesis was that Hitler was not the demoniacal figure of popular imagination but in foreign affairs a normal German leader. Citing Fritz Fischer, he argued that the foreign policy of Nazi Germany was the same as those of the Weimar Republic and the German Empire. Moreover, in a partial break with his view of German history advocated in The Course of German History, he argued that Hitler was not just a mainstream German leader but also a mainstream Western leader. As a normal Western leader, Hitler was no better or worse than Gustav Stresemann, Neville Chamberlain or Édouard Daladier. His argument was that Hitler wished to make Germany the strongest power in Europe but he did not want or plan war. The outbreak of war in 1939 was an unfortunate accident caused by mistakes on everyone's part and was not a part of Hitler's plan.

Taylor portrayed Hitler as a grasping opportunist with no beliefs other than the pursuit of power and anti-Semitism. He argued that Hitler did not possess any sort of programme and his foreign policy was one of drift and seizing chances as they offered themselves. He did not consider Hitler's anti-Semitism unique: he argued that millions of Germans were just as ferociously anti-Semitic as Hitler and there was no reason to single out Hitler for sharing the beliefs of millions of others.

Taylor argued that the basic problem with an interwar Europe was a flawed Treaty of Versailles that was sufficiently onerous to ensure that the overwhelming majority of Germans would always hate it, but insufficiently onerous in that it failed to destroy Germany's potential to be a Great Power once more. In this way, Taylor argued that the Versailles Treaty was destabilising, for sooner or later the innate power of Germany that the Allies had declined to destroy in 1918–1919 would inevitably reassert itself against the Versailles Treaty and the international system established by Versailles that the Germans regarded as unjust and thus had no interest in preserving. Though Taylor argued that the Second World War was not inevitable and that the Versailles Treaty was nowhere near as harsh as contemporaries like John Maynard Keynes believed, what he regarded as a flawed peace settlement made the war more likely than not.

=== English History 1914–1945 ===
In 1965 he rebounded from the controversy surrounding The Origins of the Second World War with the success of his book English History 1914–1945, his only venture into social and cultural history, where he portrayed the years between 1914 and 1945 in favourable terms. English History 1914–1945 was a best-seller and in its first year in print sold more than all of the previous volumes of the Oxford History of England combined. Though he held many anti-British views, especially in regard to Ireland, he was very proud to be British and more specifically English. He stressed his nonconformist Northern English background and saw himself as part of a grand tradition of radical dissent that he regarded as the real glorious history of England.

=== The Reichstag Fire (introduction) ===
In 1964 Taylor wrote the introduction for The Reichstag Fire by the journalist Fritz Tobias. He thus became the first English-language historian and the first historian after Hans Mommsen to accept the conclusions of the book, that the Nazis had not caused the Reichstag fire and that Marinus van der Lubbe had acted alone. Tobias and Taylor argued that the new Nazi government had been looking for something to increase its share of the vote in the elections of 5 March 1933, so as to activate the Enabling Act, and that van der Lubbe had serendipitously (for the Nazis) provided it by burning down the Reichstag. Even without the fire, the Nazis were quite determined to destroy German democracy. In Taylor's opinion, van der Lubbe had made their task easier by providing a pretext. The German Communist propaganda chief Willi Münzenberg and his OGPU handlers had manufactured the evidence implicating the Nazis in the arson. Tobias and Taylor pointed out that the so-called "secret tunnels" that supposedly gave the Nazis access to the Reichstag were in fact tunnels for water piping. At the time Taylor was widely attacked by many other historians for endorsing what was considered to be a self-evident perversion of established historical facts.

=== War by Timetable ===
In his 1969 book War by Timetable, Taylor examined the origins of the First World War, concluding that though all of the great powers wished to increase their own power relative to the others, none consciously sought war before 1914. Instead, he argued that all of the great powers believed that if they possessed the ability to mobilise their armed forces faster than any of the others, this would serve as a sufficient deterrent to avoid war and allow them to achieve their foreign policy aims. Thus, the general staffs of the great powers developed elaborate timetables to mobilise faster than any of their rivals. When the crisis broke in 1914, though none of the statesmen of Europe wanted a world war, the need to mobilise faster than potential rivals created an inexorable movement towards war. Thus Taylor claimed that the leaders of 1914 became prisoners of the logic of the mobilisation timetables and the timetables that were meant to serve as deterrent to war instead relentlessly brought war.

=== Beaverbrook: A Biography ===
In the 1950s and 1960s, Taylor befriended Lord Beaverbrook and later wrote his biography in 1972. Beaverbrook, Canadian in origin, was a Conservative who believed strongly in the British Empire and whose entry into politics was in support of Bonar Law, a Conservative leader strongly connected with the establishment of Northern Ireland. Despite the disdain for most politicians expressed in his writings, Taylor was fascinated by politics and politicians and often cultivated relations with those who possessed power. Beside Lord Beaverbrook, whose company Taylor very much enjoyed, his favourite politician was the Labour Party leader Michael Foot, whom he often described as the greatest Prime Minister Britain never had.

=== Introductions ===
Taylor also wrote significant introductions to British editions of Marx's The Communist Manifesto and of Ten Days that Shook the World, by John Reed. He had long been an advocate of a treaty with the Soviet Union so British Communists expected him to be friendly. In 1963, the British Communist Party, which held the copyright to Ten Days that Shook the World in the United Kingdom, offered Taylor the opportunity to write the introduction to a new edition. The introduction Taylor wrote was fairly sympathetic towards the Bolsheviks. However, it also pointed out certain contradictions between Reed's book and the official historiography in the Soviet Union—for instance, that Leon Trotsky played a very prominent, heroic role in Ten Days That Shook The World while in 1963 Trotsky was almost a non-person in Soviet historiography, mentioned only in terms of abuse. The British Communist Party rejected Taylor's introduction as anti-Soviet. The rejection annoyed Taylor. When the copyright expired in 1977 and a non-Communist publisher reissued the book, asking Taylor to write the introduction, he strengthened some of his criticisms. Taylor also wrote the introduction for Fighter: The True Story of the Battle of Britain by Len Deighton.

=== Journalism ===
Starting in 1931, Taylor worked as book reviewer for the Manchester Guardian, and from 1957 he was a columnist with the Observer. In 1951 Taylor made his first move into mass-market journalism, spending just over a year as a columnist at the tabloid Sunday Pictorial, later renamed the Sunday Mirror. His first article was an attack on the stance of the United Nations during the Korean War, in which he argued that the UN was merely a front for American policy. After leaving the Sunday Pictorial in 1952, in the wake of editor Philip Zec's dismissal, he began writing a weekly column the following year for the Daily Herald until 1956.

From 1957 until 1982 he wrote for the Sunday Express, owned by his friend and patron Lord Beaverbrook. His first column for that paper was "Why Must We Soft-Soap The Germans?", in which he complained that the majority of Germans were still Nazis at heart and argued the European Economic Community was little more than an attempt by the Germans to achieve via trade what they failed to accomplish through arms in the First and Second World Wars. At a time when the relationship with the EEC was a major issue in Britain, Taylor's pro-Commonwealth Euroscepticism became a common theme in many of his articles. Other frequent targets were the BBC, the anti-smoking lobby and, reversing his earlier stance, the motor car, with Taylor calling for all private motor vehicles to be banned.

=== Broadcasting ===
The Second World War gave Taylor the opportunity to branch out from print journalism, initially into radio and then later television. On 17 March 1942 Taylor made the first of seven appearances on The World at War – Your Questions Answered broadcast by BBC Forces' Radio. After the war Taylor became one of the first television historians. His appearances began with his role as a panellist on the BBC's In The News from 1950 to 1954. Here he was noted for his argumentative style: in one episode he declined to acknowledge the presence of the other panellists. The press came to refer to him as the "sulky don" and in 1954 he was dropped. From 1955 Taylor was a panellist on ITV's rival discussion programme Free Speech, where he remained until the series ended in 1961. In 1957, 1957–1958 and 1961 he made a number of half-hour programmes on ITV in which he lectured without notes on a variety of topics, such as the Russian Revolution of 1917 and the First World War. These were huge ratings successes. Despite earlier strong feelings against the BBC, he lectured for a BBC historical series in 1961 and made more series for it in 1963, 1976, 1977 and 1978. He also hosted additional series for ITV in 1964, 1966 and 1967. In Edge of Britain in 1980 he toured the towns of northern England. Taylor's final TV appearance was in the series How Wars End in 1985, where the effects of Parkinson's disease on him were apparent.

Taylor had a famous rivalry with the historian Hugh Trevor-Roper, with whom he often debated on television. One of the more famous exchanges took place in 1961. Trevor-Roper said "I'm afraid that your book The Origins of the Second World War may damage your reputation as a historian", to which Taylor replied "Your criticism of me would damage your reputation as a historian, if you had one."

The origins of the dispute went back to 1957 when the Regius Professorship for History at Oxford was vacant. Despite their divergent political philosophies, Taylor and Trevor-Roper had been friends since the early 1950s, but with the possibility of the Regius Professorship, both men lobbied for it. The Conservative Prime Minister Harold Macmillan awarded the chair to the Tory Trevor-Roper rather than the Labourite Taylor. In addition, a number of the other Oxford dons had felt that Taylor's profile in journalism was "demeaning" to the historian's craft and had lobbied against him.

In public, Taylor declared that he would never have accepted any honour from a government that had "the blood of Suez on its hands". In private, he was furious with Trevor-Roper for holding an honour that Taylor considered rightfully his. Adding to Taylor's rancour was that he had arrived at Oxford a decade before Trevor-Roper. From then on, Taylor never missed a chance to disparage Trevor-Roper's character or scholarship. The famously combative Trevor-Roper reciprocated. The feud was given much publicity by the media, not so much because of the merits of their disputes but rather because their acrimonious debates on television made for entertaining viewing. Likewise, the various articles written by Taylor and Trevor-Roper denouncing each other's scholarship, in which both men's considerable powers of invective were employed with maximum effect, made for entertaining reading. Beyond that, it was fashionable to portray the dispute between Taylor and Trevor-Roper as a battle between generations. Taylor, with his populist, irreverent style, was nearly a decade older than Trevor-Roper, but was represented by the media as a symbol of the younger generation that was coming of age in the 1950s–1960s. Trevor-Roper, who was unabashedly old-fashioned (he was one of the last Oxford dons to lecture wearing his professor's robes) and inclined to behave in a manner that the media portrayed as pompous and conceited, was seen as a symbol of the older generation. A subtle but important difference in the style between the two historians was their manner of addressing each other during their TV debates: Trevor-Roper always addressed Taylor as "Mr Taylor" or just "Taylor", while Taylor always addressed Trevor-Roper as "Hugh".

Another frequent sparring partner on TV for Taylor was the writer Malcolm Muggeridge. The frequent television appearances helped to make Taylor the most famous British historian of the 20th century. He featured in a cameo in the 1981 film Time Bandits and was satirised in an episode of Monty Python's Flying Circus, in which a scantily clad woman (identified by an onscreen caption as "A. J. P. Taylor, Historian"), dubbed over with a man's voice, delivers a lecture on "Eighteenth Century Social Reform". Another foray into the world of entertainment occurred in the 1960s when he served as the historical consultant for both the stage and film versions of Oh, What a Lovely War! Though he possessed great charm and charisma and a sense of humour, as he aged he presented himself as, and came to be seen as, cantankerous and irascible.

== Opinions ==
Throughout his life, Taylor took public stands on the great issues of his time. In the early 1930s, he was in a left-wing pacifist group called the Manchester Peace Council, for which he frequently spoke in public. Until 1936, Taylor was an opponent of British rearmament as he felt that a re-armed Britain would ally itself with Germany against the Soviet Union. However, after 1936, he resigned from the Manchester Peace Council, urged British rearmament in the face of what he considered to be the Nazi menace and advocated an Anglo-Soviet alliance to contain Germany. After 1936, he also fervently criticised appeasement, a stance that he disavowed in 1961.

In 1938, he denounced the Munich Agreement at several rallies and may have written several leaders in the Manchester Guardian criticising it; later, he would compare the smaller number of Czechoslovak dead with the number of Polish dead. In October 1938, Taylor attracted particular controversy by a speech he gave at a dinner held every October to commemorate a protest by a group of Oxford dons against James II in 1688, an event that was an important prelude to the Glorious Revolution. He denounced the Munich Agreement and those who supported it, warning the assembled dons that if action were not taken immediately to resist Nazi Germany, then they might all soon be living under the rule of a much greater tyrant than James II. Taylor's speech was highly contentious, in part because in October 1938 the Munich Agreement was popular with the public even if subsequently it was to be reviled along with the policy of appeasement, and also because he used a non-partisan and non-political occasion to make a highly partisan, politically charged attack on government policy.

Throughout his life, Taylor was sympathetic to the foreign policy of the Soviet Union and, after 1941, was overjoyed to have the Soviet Union as Britain's ally, as this was the realisation of his desire for an Anglo-Soviet alliance. The Second World War further increased Taylor's pro-Soviet feelings, as he was always profoundly grateful for the Red Army's role in destroying Nazi Germany. Despite his pro-Soviet views, he was strongly critical of Stalinism, and in 1948 he attended and did his best to sabotage a Stalinist cultural congress in Wrocław, Poland. His speech, which was broadcast live on Polish radio and via speakers on the streets of Wrocław, about the right of everyone to hold different views from those who hold power, was enthusiastically received by the delegates and was met with thunderous applause. The speech was clearly intended as a rebuttal of a speech given by the Soviet writer Alexander Fadeyev the previous day, who had demanded obedience on the part of everyone to Joseph Stalin.

As a socialist, Taylor saw the capitalist system as wrong on practical and moral grounds, although he rejected the Marxist view that capitalism was responsible for wars and conflicts. He felt that the status quo in the West was highly unstable, prone to accident and prevented a just and moral international system from coming into being. Moreover, Taylor was enraged by the decision of the Western powers, which he blamed on the US, to re-build and establish the West German state in the late 1940s, which Taylor saw as laying the foundations for a Fourth Reich that would one day plunge the world back into war.

He also blamed the United States for the Cold War, and in the 1950s and 1960s was one of the leading lights of the Campaign for Nuclear Disarmament. Though he preferred that the United Kingdom be neutral in the Cold War, he felt that if Britain should have to align itself with a major power, the best partner was the Soviet Union rather than America, which in Taylor's opinion was carrying out reckless policies that increased the risk of World War Three. Taylor never visited the United States, despite receiving many invitations.

In 1950, he was again temporarily banned by the BBC when he attempted to deliver a radio address against British participation in the Korean War. After a public outcry, the BBC relented and allowed him to deliver his address. In 1956 Taylor demonstrated against the Suez War, though not the Soviet crushing of the 1956 Hungarian Revolution, which he believed had saved Hungary from a return to the rule of Admiral Miklós Horthy. He also championed Israel, which he saw as a model socialist democracy threatened by reactionary Arab dictatorships. Taylor was also opposed to, and condemned, the US intervention in the Vietnam War.

Taylor was also opposed to the British Empire and against Britain's participation in the European Economic Community and NATO.

In an interview with Irish State radio in April 1976, Taylor argued that the British presence in Northern Ireland was perpetuating the conflict there. Taylor claimed the best solution would be for an "armed push" by the Irish nationalists to drive out the one million Ulster Protestants from Ireland. He cited as a successful precedent the expulsion of Germans from Czechoslovakia after the Second World War. On the question of whether there would be a civil war should Britain quit Northern Ireland, Taylor answered: "What we have, after all, is an incipient civil war. To put it brutally, if there were a civil war in Northern Ireland, and I am not convinced that there would be, quite a lot of people would be killed and the war would be decided within a few months. Spread over the years, probably more people have been killed".

In 1980 Taylor resigned from the British Academy in protest against the expulsion of the art historian and Soviet spy Anthony Blunt, which he saw as an act of McCarthyism. Closer to his work as a historian, Taylor espoused less government secrecy and, paradoxically for a staunch leftist, fought for more privately owned television stations. His experiences with being banned by the BBC had led him to appreciate the value of having many broadcasters. In regard to government archives, Taylor took part in a successful attempt to lobby the British government to replace the 50-year rule with a 30-year rule.

=== Anti-German views ===
Taylor held fierce anti-German views. In 1944, he was temporarily banned from the BBC following complaints about a series of lectures he gave on air in which he gave full vent to his anti-German feelings. In his 1945 book, The Course of German History, he argued that National Socialism was the inevitable product of the entire history of the Germans going back to the days of the Germanic tribes. He was an early champion of what has since been called the Sonderweg (Special Way) interpretation of German history, that German culture and society developed over the centuries in such a way as to make Nazi Germany inevitable. Moreover, he argued that there was a symbiotic relationship between Hitler and the German people, with Adolf Hitler needing the Germans to fulfil his dreams of conquest and the German people needing Hitler to fulfil their dreams of subjugation of their neighbours. In particular, he accused the Germans of waging an endless Drang nach Osten against their Slavic neighbours since the days of Charlemagne.

For Taylor, Nazi racial imperialism was a continuation of policies pursued by every German ruler. The Course of German History was a best-seller in both the United Kingdom and the United States; it was the success of this book that made Taylor's reputation in the United States. Its success also marked the beginning of the breach between Taylor and his mentor Namier, who wanted to write a similar book. By the 1950s, relations between Taylor and Namier had noticeably cooled and in his 1983 autobiography, A Personal History, Taylor, though acknowledging a huge intellectual debt to Namier, portrayed him as a pompous bore.

=== Opposed "Great Men" approach to history ===
Taylor's approach to history was the larger the audience the better. He felt that history should be open to all and enjoyed being called the "People's Historian" and the "Everyman's Historian". He usually favoured an anti-great man theory, history being made for the most part by towering figures of stupidity rather than of genius. In his view, leaders did not make history; instead they reacted to events – what happened in the past was due to sequences of blunders and errors that were largely outside anyone's control. To the extent that anyone made anything happen in history, it was only through their mistakes.

Though Taylor normally preferred to portray leaders as fools blundering their way forward, he did think that individuals sometimes could play a positive role in history; his heroes were Vladimir Lenin and David Lloyd George. But for Taylor, people like Lloyd George and Lenin were the exceptions. Despite Taylor's increasing ambivalence toward appeasement from the late 1950s, which became explicitly evident in his 1961 book Origins of the Second World War, Winston Churchill remained another of his heroes. In English History 1914–1945 (1965), he famously concluded his biographical footnote of Churchill with the phrase "the saviour of his country". Another person Taylor admired was the historian E. H. Carr, who was his favourite historian and a good friend.

=== Irony and humour ===
His narratives used irony and humour to entertain as well as inform. He examined history from odd angles, exposing what he considered to be the pomposities of historical characters. He was famed for "Taylorisms": witty, epigrammatic and sometimes cryptic remarks that were meant to expose what he considered to be the absurdities and paradoxes of modern international relations. An example is in his television piece Mussolini (1970), in which he said the dictator "kept up with his work – by doing none"; or, about Metternich's political philosophies: "Most men could do better while shaving". His determination to bring history to everyone drove his frequent appearances on radio and later on television. He was also careful to puncture any aura of infallibility that historians might have. On one occasion when asked what he thought the future might bring, he replied "Dear boy, you should never ask an historian to predict the future – frankly we have a hard enough time predicting the past." Taylor wrote about English History 1914–1945 that he offered up a parody of Oxford historians "delivering the Judgement of History in the highest Olympian spirit. I followed their example except the poor were always right and the rich always wrong – a judgement that happens to be correct historically. Some of the details were also a parody, as for instance the solemn discussion as when 'Fuck' attained literary though not conversational respectability. I had more fun writing English History 1914–1945 than in writing any of my other books".

=== "The Establishment" ===
Taylor has been credited with coining the term "the Establishment" in a 1953 book review, but this is disputed. On 29 August 1953, in reviewing a biography of William Cobbett in New Statesman, Taylor wrote "The Establishment draws in recruits from outside as soon as they are ready to conform to its standards and become respectable. There is nothing more agreeable in life than to make peace with the Establishment – and nothing more corrupting."

=== Speed limits ===
In 1967, Taylor wrote an article for the Sunday Express in which he argued that speed limits had made absolutely no positive difference to road safety and that "on the contrary, [speed limits] tend to increase the risks and dangers". Taylor went on to claim "I have been driving a car for 45 years. I have consistently ignored all the various speed limits. Never once have I encountered the slightest risk as a result." The article caused a member of the public to lodge a complaint with the Press Council, on the grounds that Taylor's remarks "amount[ed] to an indirect incitement to drivers to break the law". The Council eventually rejected the complaint and ruled that "while Mr Taylor's views are controversial, he has an unchallengeable right to express them".

== Criticisms ==
=== The Origins of the Second World War ===
The Origins of the Second World War was received negatively in some quarters when it was published in 1961. The book set off a huge storm of controversy and debate that lasted for years. At least part of the vehement criticism was due to the confusion in the public's mind between Taylor's book and another book published in 1961, Der Erzwungene Krieg (The Forced War) by the American historian David Hoggan. Taylor criticised Hoggan's thesis that Germany was the innocent victim of an Anglo-Polish conspiracy in 1939 as nonsense, but many critics confused Taylor's thesis with that of Hoggan. Most of the criticism was over Taylor's arguments for appeasement as a rational political strategy, his mechanistic portrayal of a world destined for another world war by post-war settlement of 1918–1919, his depiction of the Second World War as an "accident" caused by diplomatic blunders, his portrayal of Hitler as a "normal leader" and what many considered his flippant dismissal of Nazi ideology as a motivating force. Leading the charge against Taylor was his arch-enemy Trevor-Roper, who contended that Taylor had wilfully and egregiously misinterpreted the evidence. In particular, Trevor-Roper criticised Taylor's argument that the Hossbach Memorandum of 1937 was a meaningless document because none of the scenarios outlined in the Memorandum as the prerequisite for war, such as the Spanish Civil War leading to a war between Italy and France in the Mediterranean, or civil war breaking out in France, occurred. In Trevor-Roper's opinion, what really mattered about the Hossbach Memorandum was that Hitler clearly expressed an intention to go to war sooner rather than later and it was Hitler's intentions rather than his plans at the time which mattered. However, in the last edition of the book, Taylor argues that the significant parts, if not the whole, of the memorandum are in fact fabrications.

Other historians who criticised The Origins of the Second World War included: Isaac Deutscher, Barbara Tuchman, Ian Morrow, Gerhard Weinberg, Elizabeth Wiskemann, W. N. Medlicott, Tim Mason, John Lukacs, Karl Dietrich Bracher, Frank Freidel, Harry Hinsley, John Wheeler-Bennett, Golo Mann, Lucy Dawidowicz, Gordon A. Craig, A. L. Rowse, Raymond Sontag, Andreas Hillgruber and Yehuda Bauer. Rowse, who had once been a close friend of Taylor's, attacked him with an intensity and vehemence that was second only to Trevor-Roper's. In addition, several historians wrote books on the origins of the Second World War with the aim of refuting Taylor's thesis. Taylor was angered by some of the criticism, especially the implication that he had set out to exonerate Hitler, writing that "to the best of my recollection, those who now display indignation against me were not active [against appeasement] on the public platform". Some notable examples include Gerhard Weinberg's two-volume The Foreign Policy of Hitler's Germany and Andreas Hillgruber's Deutschlands Rolle in der Vorgeschichte der beiden Weltkriege [Germany's Role in the Background to Both World Wars], translated as Germany and the Two World Wars.

The issue of misinterpretation is also addressed in Gordon A. Craig's book Germany: 1866–1945, where it is argued that Taylor dismissed Hitler's foreign policy, as presented in Mein Kampf, and in particular, the remilitarisation of the Rhineland, as a jumble of idle thoughts written down under the impact of the French occupation of the Ruhr.

As angry as the reaction in Britain was to The Origins of the Second World War, it was greater when the book was published in January 1962 in the United States. With the exception of Harry Elmer Barnes and Murray Rothbard, every American historian who reviewed Taylor's book gave it a negative review. Perhaps ironically, Taylor had indirectly criticised Barnes when he wrote contemptuously of certain self-styled American Revisionist historians whose work Taylor characterised as marked by obsessive loathing for their own country, nostalgia for isolationism, hatred for the New Deal and a tendency to engage in bizarre conspiracy theories. Despite the best efforts of Barnes and his protégé David Hoggan to recruit Taylor to their cause, Taylor always made clear that he wanted nothing to do with either Barnes or Hoggan.

Despite the criticism, The Origins of the Second World War is regarded as a watershed in the historiography of the origins of the Second World War. In general, historians have praised Taylor for the following:

- In focusing on the improvised character of German and Italian foreign policy, he helped to create a debate over the degree to which fascist states were fulfilling a programme versus taking advantage of events.
- In highlighting certain continuities in German foreign policy between 1871 and 1939, he helped to place Nazi foreign policy in a wider perspective, although the degree of continuity is still subject to considerable debate.
- As the first English-language historian to bring attention to the work of the French economist and historian Étienne Mantoux, especially his 1946 book The Carthaginian Peace: or The Economic Consequences of Mr Keynes, he was able to show that Germany was capable of paying reparations to France after the First World War; the only problem was that the Germans were unwilling. In this way, he started an important debate over who was really responsible for the hyperinflation that destroyed the German economy in 1923.
- In showing that appeasement was a popular policy and that there was continuity in British foreign policy after 1933, he shattered the common view of the appeasers as a small, degenerate clique that had mysteriously hijacked the British government sometime in the 1930s and who had carried out their policies in the face of massive public resistance.
- In showing that the Anschluss was enormously popular in Austria, he helped to discredit the notion of Austria as a victim of Nazi aggression brought unwillingly into the Reich.
- In portraying the leaders of the 1930s as real people attempting to deal with real problems, he made the first strides towards attempting an explanation of the actions of the appeasers rather than merely condemning them.
- He was one of the first historians to present Hitler as an ordinary human being rather than as a "madman", albeit one who held morally repellent beliefs, thus offering possibilities to explain his actions.
- In showing that Hitler just as often reacted as acted, he offered a balance to previous accounts in which Hitler was portrayed as the sole agent and the leaders of Britain and France as entirely reactive.

In response to Taylor's argument that Hitler had no programme because his foreign policy seemed to operate in a haphazard and slapdash way, Taylor's critics such as Trevor-Roper construed a theorem in which Hitler held "consistent aims" but sought to achieve them via "flexible methods".

=== Portrayal of Mussolini ===
Taylor drew a picture of Benito Mussolini as a great showman, but also as an inept leader with no beliefs. The first part of this picture has not been generally challenged by historians, but the second part has. Taylor argued that Mussolini was sincere when he helped forge the Stresa Front with Britain and France to resist any German challenge to the status quo in Europe and that only the League of Nations sanctions imposed on Fascist Italy for Italian invasion of Ethiopia drove Mussolini into an alliance with Nazi Germany. Recently, a number of specialists in Italian history have challenged this by arguing that Mussolini possessed a belief in the spazio vitale (vital space) as a guiding foreign policy concept in which the entire Mediterranean, the Balkans, the Middle East and the Horn of Africa were regarded as rightfully belonging to Italy, leading to inevitable conflict with the two dominant Mediterranean powers, Britain and France.

=== The French Third Republic ===
Taylor has been criticised for promoting the La décadence view of the French Third Republic. This historical concept portrays the Third Republic as a decadent state, forever on the verge of collapse. In particular, advocates of the La décadence concept have asserted that inter-war France was riven by political instability; possessed a leadership that was deeply divided, corrupt, incompetent and pusillanimous, which ruled over a nation rent by mass unemployment, strikes, a sense of despair over the future, riots and a state of near-civil war between the Left and the Right. Of all the French governments of the interwar era, only the Popular Front government of Léon Blum was presented sympathetically by Taylor, which he praised for carrying out what he regarded as long overdue social reforms. Many experts in French history have admitted that there is a kernel of truth to Taylor's picture of France but have complained that Taylor presented French politics and society in such a manner as to border on caricature.

== Retirement ==
Taylor was badly injured in 1984 when he was run over by a car while crossing Old Compton Street in London. The effect of the accident led to his retirement in 1985. In his last years, he endured Parkinson's disease, which left him incapable of writing. His last public appearance was at his 80th birthday, in 1986, when a group of his former students, including Sir Martin Gilbert, Alan Sked, Norman Davies and Paul Kennedy, organised a public reception in his honour. He had, with considerable difficulty, memorised a short speech, which he delivered in a manner that managed to hide the fact that his memory and mind had been permanently damaged by Parkinson's.

In 1987, he entered a nursing home in Barnet, London, where he died on 7 September 1990 aged 84. He was cremated at Golders Green Crematorium.

== Works ==
- The Italian Problem in European Diplomacy, 1847–1849, 1934.
- (editor) The Struggle for Supremacy in Germany, 1859–1866 by Heinrich Friedjung, 1935.
- Germany's First Bid for Colonies 1884–1885: a Move in Bismarck's European Policy, 1938.
- The Habsburg Monarchy 1809–1918, 1941, revised edition 1948, reissued in 1966 OCLC 4311308.
- The Course of German history: a Survey of the Development of Germany since 1815, 1945. Reissued in 1962. OCLC 33368634
- Trieste, (London: Yugoslav Information Office, 1945). 32 pages.
- Co-edited with R. Reynolds British Pamphleteers, 1948.
- Co-edited with Alan Bullock A Select List of Books on European History, 1949.
- From Napoleon to Stalin, 1950.
- Rumours of Wars, 1952.
- The Struggle for Mastery in Europe 1848–1918 (Oxford History of Modern Europe), 1954.
- Bismarck: the Man and Statesman, 1955. Reissued by Vintage Books in 1967 OCLC 351039.
- Englishmen and Others, 1956.
- co-edited with Sir Richard Pares Essays Presented to Sir Lewis Namier, 1956.
- The Trouble Makers: Dissent over Foreign Policy, 1792–1939, 1957.
- Lloyd George, 1961.
- The Origins of the Second World War, 1961. Reissued by Fawcett Books in 1969 OCLC 263622959.
- The First World War: an Illustrated History, 1963. OCLC 2054370 American edition has the title: Illustrated history of the First World War. OCLC 253080
- Politics in Wartime, 1964.
- English History 1914–1945 (Volume XV of the Oxford History of England), 1965. OCLC 36661639
- From Sarajevo to Potsdam, 1966. 1st American edition, 1967. OCLC 1499372
- From Napoleon to Lenin, 1966.
- The Abdication of King Edward VIII by Lord Beaverbrook, (editor) 1966.
- Europe: Grandeur and Decline, 1967.
- Introduction to 1848: The Opening of an Era by F. Fejto, 1967.
- War by Timetable, 1969. ISBN 0-356-02818-6
- Churchill Revised: A Critical Assessment, 1969. OCLC 4194
- (editor) Lloyd George: Twelve Essays, 1971.
- (editor) Lloyd George: A Diary by Frances Stevenson, 1971. ISBN 0091072700
- Beaverbrook, 1972. ISBN 0-671-21376-8
- (editor) Off the Record: Political Interviews, 1933–43 by W. P. Corzier, 1973.
- A History of World War Two: 1974.
- "Fritz Fischer and His School," The Journal of Modern History Vol. 47, No. 1, March 1975
- The Second World War: an Illustrated History, 1975.
- (editor) My Darling Pussy: The Letters of Lloyd George and Frances Stevenson, 1975. ISBN 0-297-77017-9
- The Last of Old Europe: a Grand Tour, 1976. Reissued in 1984. ISBN 0-283-99170-4 OCLC 80148134
- Essays in English History, 1976. ISBN 0-14-021862-9
- "Accident Prone, or What Happened Next," The Journal of Modern History Vol. 49, No. 1, March 1977
- The War Lords, 1977.
- The Russian War, 1978.
- How Wars Begin, 1979. ISBN 0-689-10982-2 OCLC 5536093
- Politicians, Socialism, and Historians, 1980.
- Revolutions and Revolutionaries, 1980.
- A Personal History, 1983.
- An Old Man's Diary, 1984.
- How Wars End, 1985.
- Letters to Eva: 1969–1983, edited by Eva Haraszti Taylor, 1991.
- From Napoleon to the Second International: Essays on Nineteenth-century Europe. Ed. 1993.
- From the Boer War to the Cold War: Essays on Twentieth-century Europe. Ed. 1995. ISBN 0-241-13445-5
- Struggles for Supremacy: Diplomatic Essays by A.J.P. Taylor. Edited by Chris Wigley. Ashgate, 2000. ISBN 1-84014-661-3 OCLC 42289691

== See also ==
- Historiography of the United Kingdom
