= The Struggle for Mastery in Europe 1848–1918 =

1954 book by A.J.P. Taylor

- Cover of the first edition
- Author: A. J. P. Taylor
- Language: English
- Subject: History of Europe
- Publisher: Clarendon Press
- Publication date: 1954
- Publication place: United Kingdom
- Media type: Print (hardcover and paperback)
- Pages: 638

The Struggle for Mastery in Europe 1848–1918 is a scholarly history book by the English historian A. J. P. Taylor and was part of "The Oxford History of Modern Europe", published by the Clarendon Press in Oxford in October 1954.

== Origins ==
In an article for Time and Tide in November 1942, Taylor wrote that "though innumerable books have been written on isolated episodes, the story of the Struggle for the Mastery of Europe has never been attempted". He added, "German historians cannot do it, because to them the struggle (that is the resistance to German domination) seems merely wrong-headed; American historians cannot do it, because they do not realize what was at stake". He concluded, "It would be a superb opportunity for an English historian, if one could be found with real standards of scholarship and understanding".

However Taylor interrupted writing the book to complete The Course of German History, which was published in July 1945. Taylor already knew German and French and could get by with Italian. He decided that learning Russian would be useful in writing the book so he learnt it as well. Between 1941 and 1944, he had written 100,000 words; by September 1952, he had finished 180,000 words; by early 1953, he had nearly completed the book.

== Contents ==
The book was published in October 1954. Its central theme is the struggle between the Great Powers for the domination of Europe between the revolutions of 1848 and the end of the Great War. As Taylor wrote:

In the state of nature which Hobbes imagined, violence was the only law, and life was 'nasty, brutish and short'. Though individuals never lived in this state of nature, the Great Powers of Europe have always done so.... However, Europe has known almost as much peace as war; and it has owed these periods of peace to the Balance of Power. No one state has ever been strong enough to eat up all the rest; and the mutual jealously of the Great Powers has preserved even the small states, which could not have preserved themselves. The relations of the Great Powers have determined the history of Europe. This book deals with them in the last age when Europe was the centre of the world.

Taylor examines the Great Powers' ability to wage war by taking into consideration their population, defence spending per capita, coal and steel production and manufacturing production. He maintained that determining the strength of a state requires an assessment of its economic resources. Taylor rejected the idea of fate or inevitability: "No war is inevitable until it breaks out".

=== Table of contents ===
Introduction: The great powers of Europe -- The diplomacy of revolution, 1848 -- The diplomacy of revolution, 1849-50 -- The end of the holy alliance, 1852-3 -- The Crimean War, 1854-6 -- The Congress of Paris and its consequences, 1856-8 -- The Italian war and the disruption of the settlement of Vienna, 1858-61 -- The Polish crisis, and the end of the Franco-Russian Entente, 1861-3 -- Bismarck's wars: the defeat of Austria, 1864-6 -- The isolation of France, 1866-70 -- The end of French primacy, 1870-5 -- The great eastern crisis, 1875-8 -- Bismarck's alliances, 1879-82 -- The breakdown of 'the liberal alliance' and its consequences, 1882-5 -- The triumph of diplomacy: the Bulgarian crisis, 1885-7 -- The making of the Franco-Russian alliance, 1888-94 -- The abortive continental league, 1894-7 -- The era of 'world policy', 1897-1902 -- The last years of British isolation: the making of the Anglo-French entente, 1902-5 -- The formation of the triple entente, 1905-9 -- The years of Anglo-German hostility, 1909-12 -- The Balkan wars and after, 1912-14 -- The outbreak of war in Europe, 1914 -- The diplomacy of war, 1914-18.

== Reception ==
Asa Briggs wrote a favourable review that stated one of the most interesting characteristics of the book was its refusal to take at face value German interpretations of history or to rely too much on Die Grosse Politik. He added that "sometimes we need to rest and think three times about his brilliant epigrams; sometimes we pine for a closer study of the economic and social background of diplomacy.... But whatever we do will be influenced by what he has done, for he has re-opened the nineteenth century rather than closed it down".

The American historian Gordon A. Craig praised Taylor: "What makes this the best study of European diplomacy since Langer's volumes on the post-1870 period is his ability to keep the major developments of the period clearly before his readers, while at the same time providing them with circumstantial and absorbing accounts of the policies and ambitions of individual powers and statesmen, the changing diplomatic alignments, and the crises and wars which filled the period".

E. H. Carr, in the Times Literary Supplement, wrote that Taylor "has not... written a history of the relations between the European nations: military operations and economic relations are both neglected. His work is diplomatic history in the strictest sense; and such abstraction, while necessary and valuable for the specialist, fits less well into the conception of general history... what perhaps justifies the detachment of diplomacy during this period is that it in some measure corresponds to the realities of the situation". However, Taylor's "detailed and penetrating analysis... the wealth of detail and... unfailing pertinacity... his sharp critical faculty and vigilant readiness to challenge orthodox opinions makes it certain that his interpretations and conjectures, whether accepted or not, will have to be taken account of by future historians".

W. E. Mosse, in the English Historical Review lamented the mixing of opinion and fact and said "its general tone is iconoclastic rather than authoritative.... All too often, real flashes of insight are marred by Mr. Taylor's straining after effect; time and again commonsense and accuracy are sacrificed on the altar of the neat epigram, the clever paradox or simply the memorable phrase". Similarly, Henry L. Roberts, in Foreign Affairs, complained that the book is "too inclined to reverse all previous interpretations".

In 1995, the Times Literary Supplement printed a list of the 100 most influential books published since 1945 in which The Struggle for Mastery appeared.

== See also ==
- International relations of the Great Powers (1814–1919)
