= Rape of Belgium =

World War I German crimes against Belgian civilians

- Part of the German occupation of Belgium during World War I and German atrocities of 1914
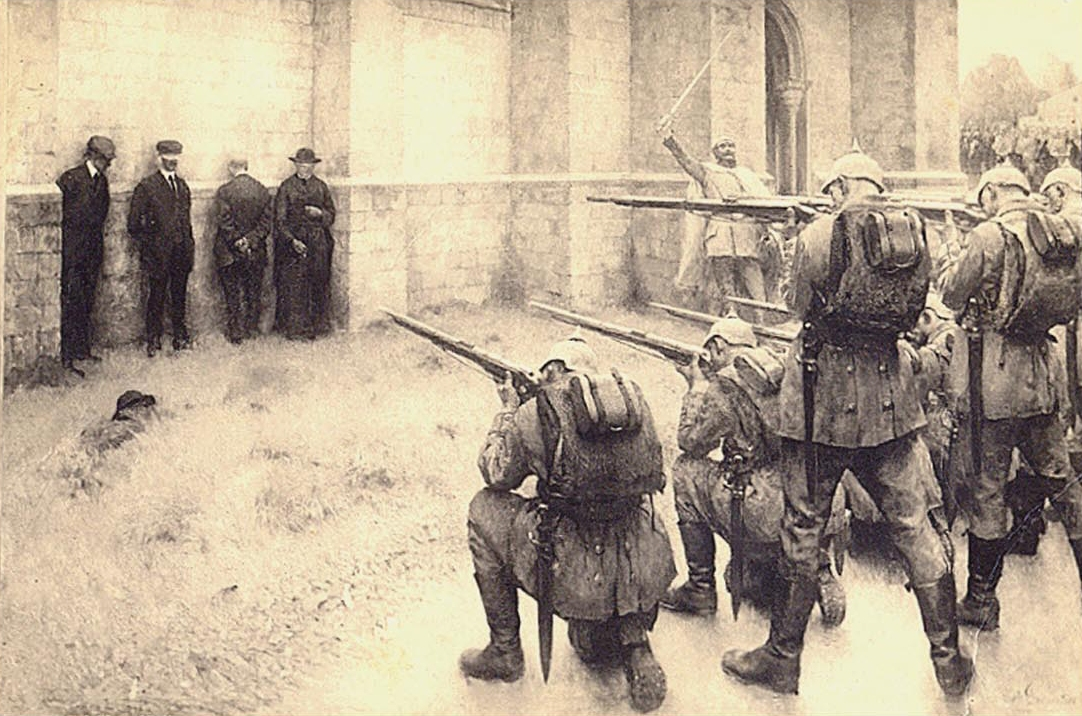
- L'exécution des notables de Blégny (The Execution of the Notables of Blégny, 1914), oil-on-canvas painting (1918) by Évariste Carpentier (1845–1922), depicting German soldiers executing Belgian civilians at Blégny during the early months of the German occupation of Belgium (on display at the Blégny-Trembleur administration building).
- Location: Belgium
- Date: August 1914 – November 1918
- Target: Belgians
- Attack type: Forced migration, mass murder, war crimes, summary executions, forced labour, internment
- Deaths: 23,700 direct 90,000 indirect
- Victims: 1.5 million Belgians forced to flee 120,000 forced to work
- Perpetrator: German Empire

The Rape of Belgium (French: Viol de la Belgique, lit. 'Rape of Belgium'; Dutch: Verkrachting van België) was a series of systematic war crimes, especially mass killing and deportation, by troops of the German Empire against Belgian civilians, many or most of them real or suspected francs-tireurs and other guerilla fighters, during the invasion and occupation of Belgium during World War I in violation of Belgian neutrality. The neutrality of Belgium had been guaranteed by the Treaty of London of 1839, which had been signed by the German Confederation (of which Prussia was a member). However, the German Schlieffen Plan required that German armed forces advance through Belgium (thus violating its neutrality) in order to outflank the French Army, concentrated in eastern France. Shortly before the beginning of the war in early August 1914 the German Chancellor, Theobald von Bethmann Hollweg, had dismissed the treaty of 1839 as a mere "scrap of paper". (Note: "There is no doubt that our invasion of Belgium, with violation it entailed of that country's sovereign neutrality, and of treaties we ourselves had signed, and the world had respected for a century, was an act of the gravest political significance. Bad was made worse than ever by Bethmans Hollweg's speech in the Reichstag (August 4, 1914). Never perhaps, has any other statesman at the head of a great and civilized people (...) pronounced (...) a more terrible speech. Before the whole world—before his country, this spokesman of the German Government—not of the Belgian!—not of the French!—declared that, in invading Belgium we did wrong, but that necessity knows no law (...) I was aware, with this one categorical statement, we had forfeited, at a blow, the imponderabilia; that this unbelievably stupid oration would set the whole world against Germany. And on the very evening after he made it this Chancellor of the German Empire, in a talk with Sir Edward Goschen (1847–1924), the British Ambassador, referred to the international obligations on which Belgium relied for her neutrality as 'un chiffon de papier', 'a scrap of paper' ... ")

== Overview ==
Throughout the war, the Imperial German Army systematically engaged in numerous atrocities against the civilian population of Belgium, including the intentional destruction of civilian property; German soldiers murdered over 6,000 Belgian civilians, and 17,700 died during expulsions, deportations, imprisonment, or death sentences by court. The Wire of Death, a lethal electric fence maintained by the Imperial German Army to hinder civilians from fleeing the occupation to the Netherlands, resulted in the deaths of over 3,000 Belgian civilians. Some 120,000 were forced to work and deported to Germany. German forces destroyed 25,000 homes and other buildings in 837 communities in 1914 alone, and 1.5 million Belgians (20% of the entire population) fled from the invading German army.

== War crimes ==
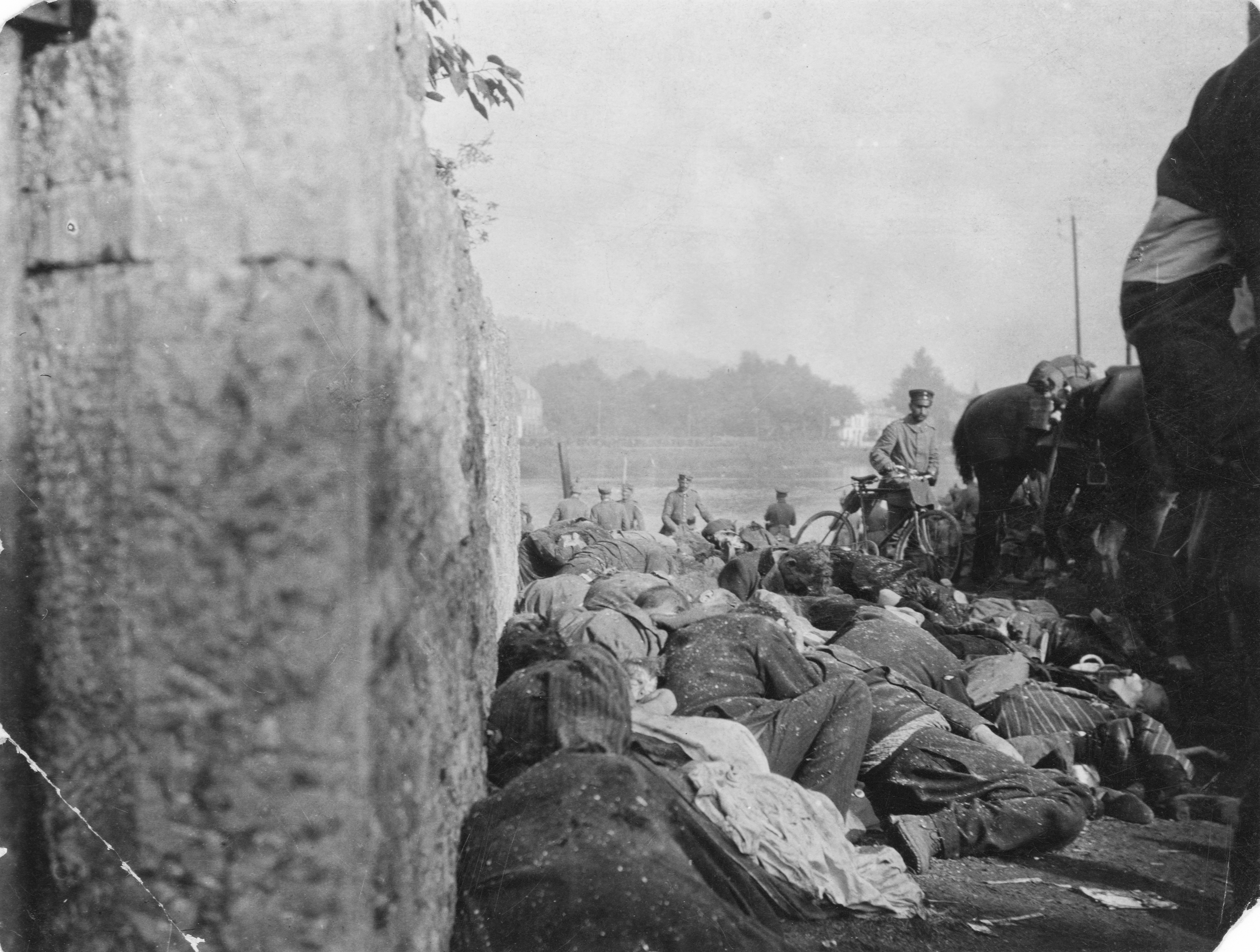
Corpses of victims of the Sack of Dinant at the "Bourdon Wall"

Atrocities were premeditated in Dinant, Liège, Andenne and Leuven. In Dinant, the German army believed the inhabitants were as dangerous as the French soldiers themselves.

=== Victimisation of civilians ===
German troops, afraid of Belgian guerrilla fighters, or francs-tireurs ("free shooters"), burned homes and murdered civilians throughout eastern and central Belgium, including Aarschot (156 murdered), Andenne (211 murdered), Seilles, Tamines (383 murdered), and Dinant (674 murdered). German soldiers murdered Belgian civilians indiscriminately and with impunity, with victims including men, women, and children. In the Province of Brabant, nuns were forcibly stripped naked under the pretext that they were spies or men in disguise. In and around Aarschot, between 19 August and the recapture of the town by 9 September, German soldiers repeatedly raped Belgian women. Rape was nearly as ubiquitous as murder, arson and looting, if never as visible.

=== Sack of Leuven ===
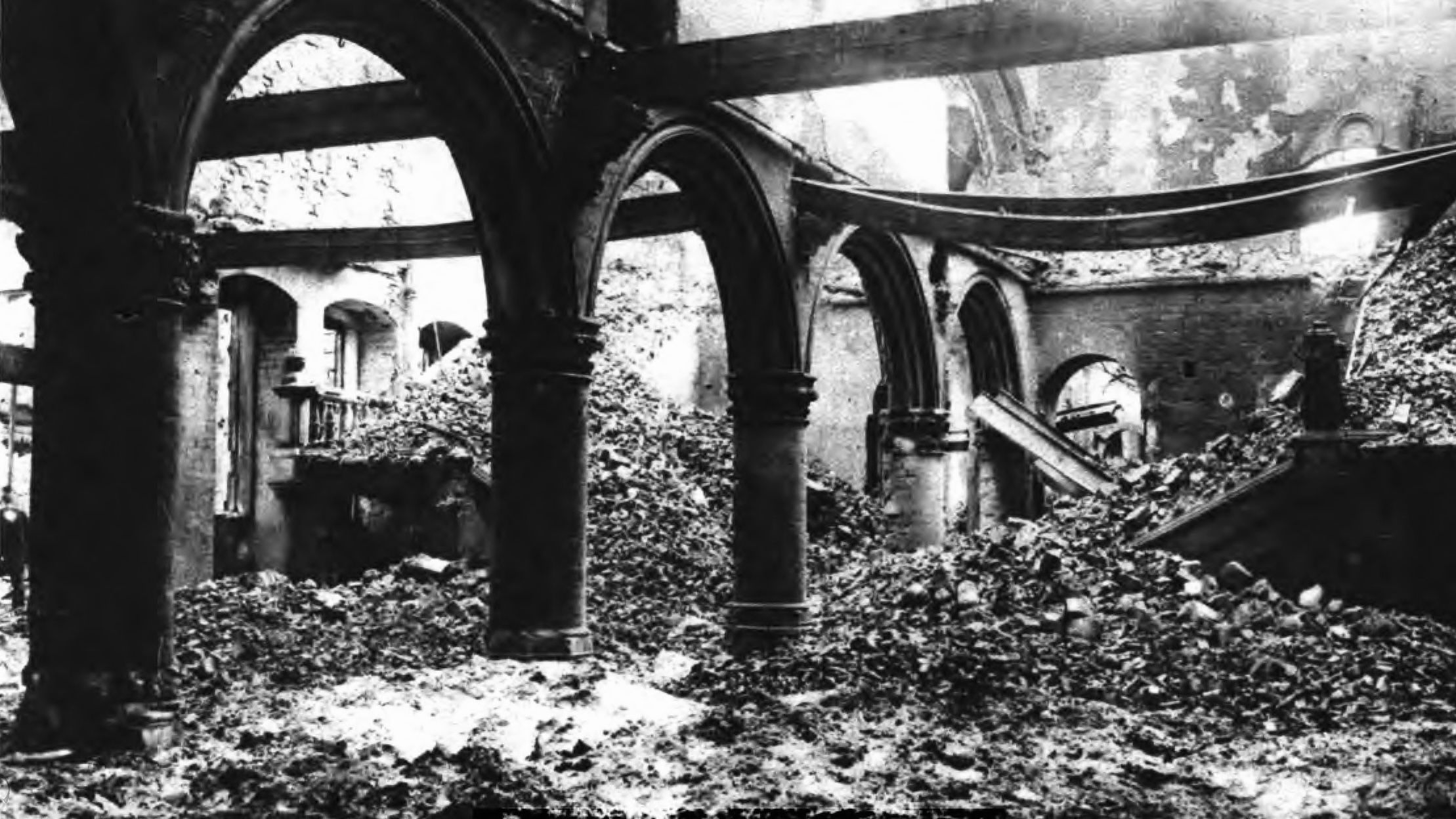
The ruins of the Catholic University of Leuven's library after it was burned by the German army in 1914

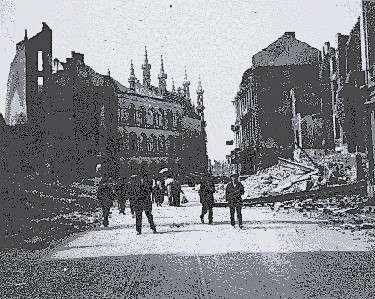
The destroyed city of Leuven in 1915

On 25 August 1914, the German army ravaged the city of Leuven, deliberately burning the university library, destroying approximately 230,000 books, 950 manuscripts, and 800 incunabula. German soldiers burned down civilian homes and shot citizens where they stood, with over 2,000 buildings destroyed and 10,000 inhabitants displaced, of whom 1,500 were deported to Germany. The Germans looted and transferred large quantities of strategic materials, foodstuffs and modern industrial equipment to Germany during 1914. These actions brought worldwide condemnation. There were also several friendly fire incidents between groups of German soldiers during the confusion.

== Industrial dismantlement ==
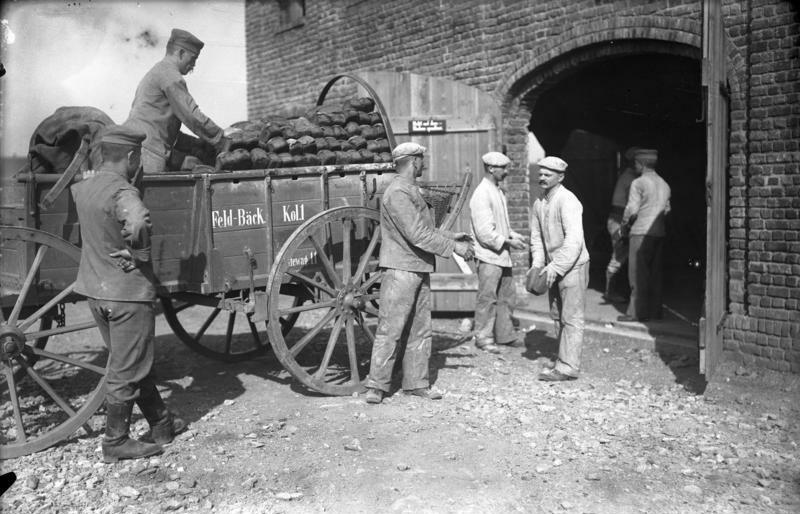
An industrial bakery near the Ypres Salient used to feed the German Army

As raw material usually imported from abroad dried up, more firms laid off workers. Unemployment became a major problem and increased reliance on charity distributed by civil institutions and organizations. As many as 650,000 people were unemployed between 1915 and 1918.

The German authorities used the unemployment crisis to loot industrial machinery from Belgian factories, which was either sent to Germany intact or melted down. The policies enacted by the Imperial German General Government of Belgium greatly slowed Belgian economic recovery after the end of the war.

== Wartime propaganda ==
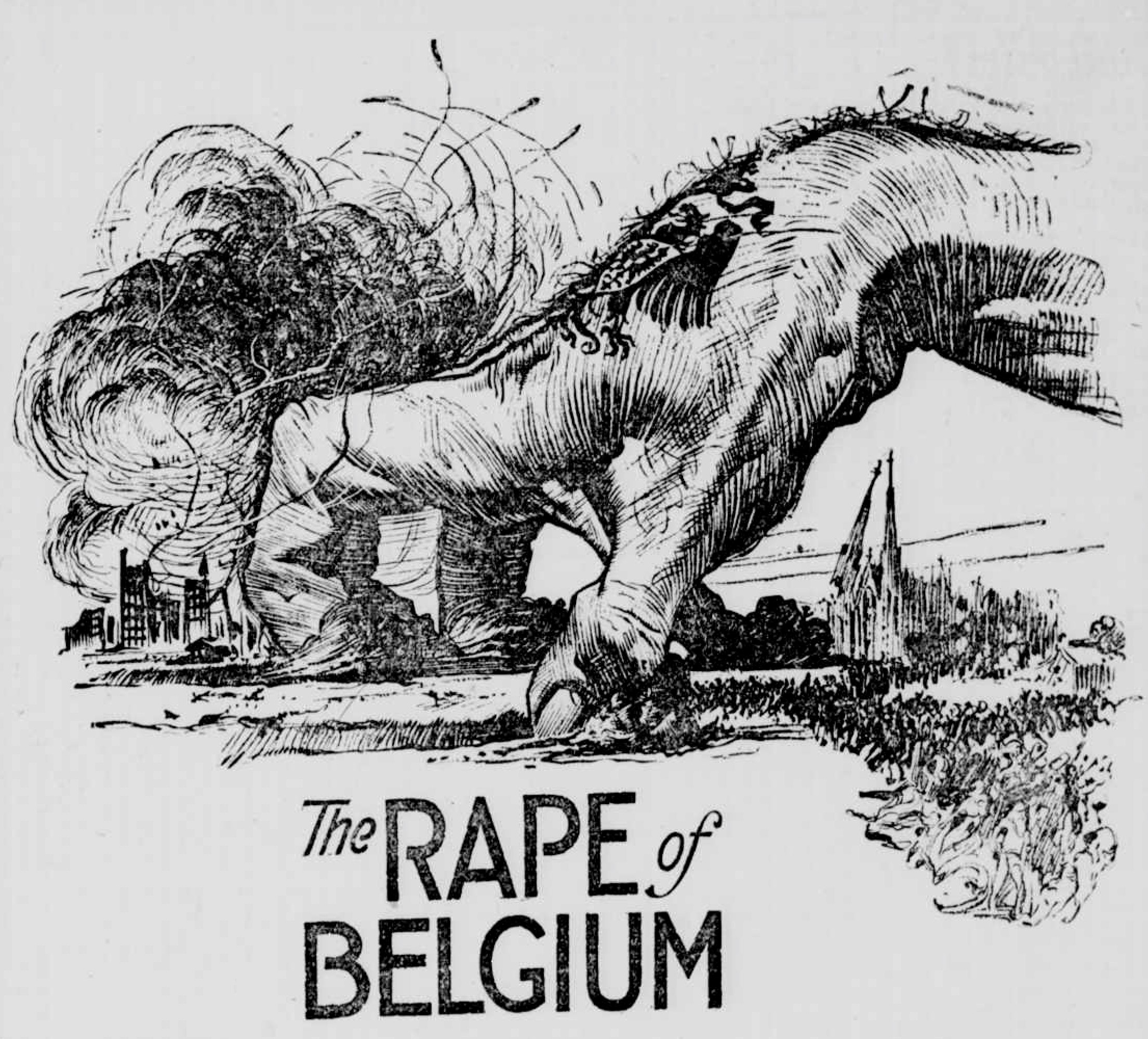
One of a series of newspaper illustrations published to promote Hugh Simons Gibson's (1883–1954) The Rape of Belgium before and during its 36-part serialization in the New-York Tribune (November 4, 1917 – December 9, 1917). Most of the advertisements appeared before November 10, 1917.

Regarding depictions of the atrocities in the British press, historian Nicoletta Gullace writes, in agreement with others such as Susan Kingsley Kent, that "the invasion of Belgium, with its very real suffering, was nevertheless represented in a highly stylized way that dwelt on perverse sexual acts, lurid mutilations, and graphic accounts of child abuse of often dubious veracity." In Britain, many patriotic publicists propagated these stories on their own. For example, popular writer William Le Queux described the German army as "one vast gang of Jack-the-Rippers", and described in graphic detail events such as a governess hanged naked and mutilated, the bayoneting of a small baby, or the "screams of dying women", raped and "horribly mutilated" by German soldiers, accusing them of mutilating the hands, feet, or breasts of their victims.

Gullace argues that "British propagandists were eager to move as quickly as possible from an explanation of the war that focused on the murder of an Austrian archduke and his wife by Serbian nationalists to the morally unambiguous question of the invasion of neutral Belgium". In support of her thesis, she quotes from two letters of Lord Bryce. In the first letter Bryce writes "There must be something fatally wrong with our so-called civilization for this Ser[b]ian cause so frightful a calamity has descended on all Europe". In a subsequent letter Bryce writes "The one thing we have to comfort us in this war is that we are all absolutely convinced of the justice of the cause, and of our duty, once Belgium had been invaded, to take up the sword".

Although the infamous German phrase "scrap of paper" (referring to the 1839 Treaty of London) galvanized a large segment of British intellectuals in support of the war, in more proletarian circles this imagery had less impact. For example, Labour politician Ramsay MacDonald upon hearing about it, declared that "Never did we arm our people and ask them to give up their lives for a less good cause than this". British army recruiters reported problems in explaining the origins of the war in legalistic terms.

As the German advance in Belgium progressed, British newspapers started to publish stories on German atrocities. The British press, "quality" and tabloid alike, showed less interest in the "endless inventory of stolen property and requisitioned goods" that constituted the bulk of the official Belgian Reports. Instead, accounts of rape and bizarre mutilations flooded the British press. The intellectual discourse on the "scrap of paper" was then mixed with the more graphic imagery depicting Belgium as a brutalized woman, exemplified by the cartoons of Louis Raemaekers, whose works were widely syndicated in the US. Part of the press, such as the editor of The Times and Edward Tyas Cook, expressed concerns that haphazard stories, a few of which were proven as outright fabrications, would weaken the powerful imagery, and asked for a more structured approach. The German and American press questioned the veracity of many stories, and the fact that the British Press Bureau did not censor the stories put the British government in a delicate position. The Bryce Committee was eventually appointed in December 1914 to investigate. Bryce was considered highly suitable to lead the effort because of his prewar pro-German attitudes and his good reputation in the United States, where he had served as Britain's ambassador, as well as his legal expertise.

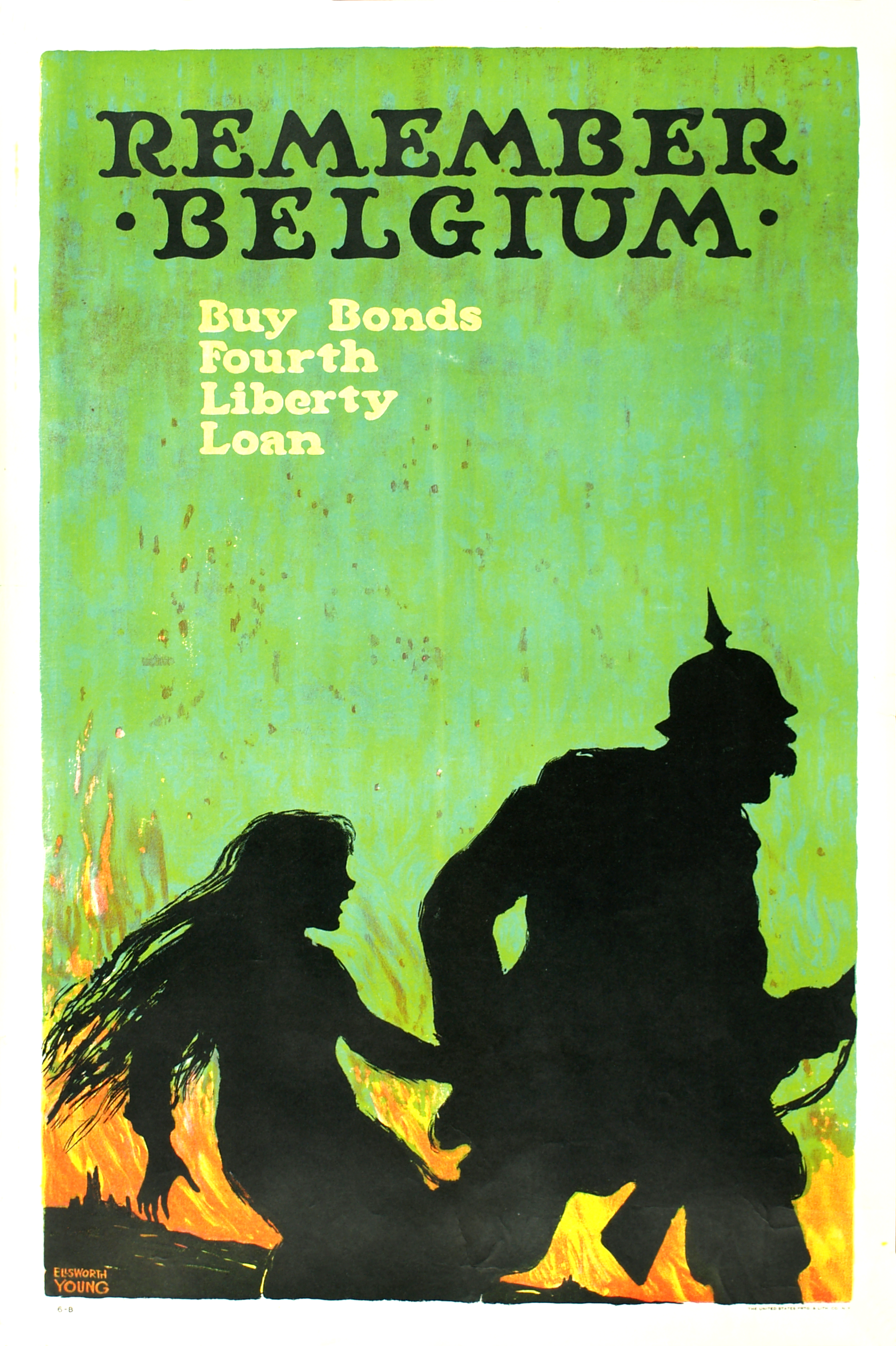
World War I US propaganda poster (1918). In the foreground, a silhouette of a Hun on the move wearing a Pickelhaube (German Army's spiked leather helmet). In his left hand, a Gewehr 98-like rifle, and with his right, he is pulling the left hand of a distressed young civilian woman – in the background, the carnage of a city in flames in a haze of smoke. Illustrated by Ellsworth Young (1866–1952).

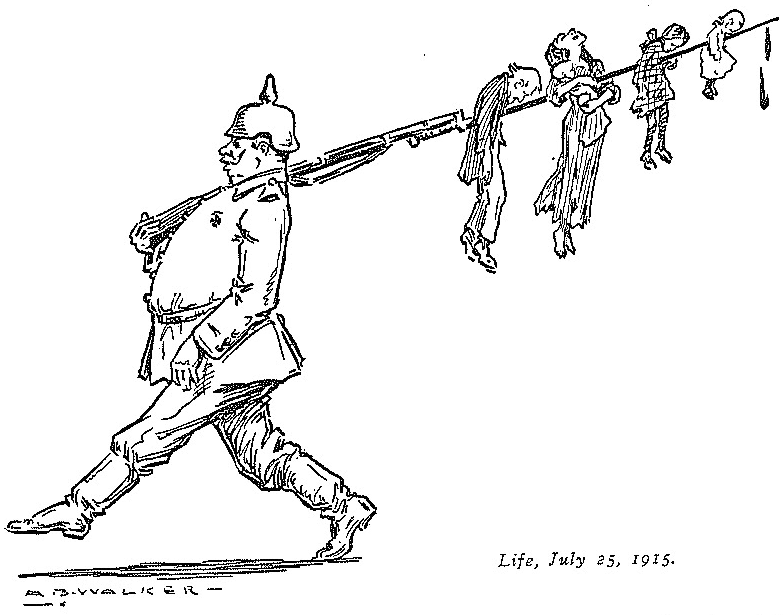
Cartoon by Alanson Burton Walker (1878–1947), published in Life (July 29, 1915), depicting a German soldier carrying the impaled bodies of Belgian civilians on his bayonet – man, woman holding a newborn, and two children – as a commentary on reports of German atrocities during World War I.

The commission's investigative efforts were limited to previously recorded testimonies and have been criticized by many writers, though later investigators have found their conclusions to be substantially vindicated, with most of the dubious claims filtered out. Gullace argues that "the commission was in essence called upon to conduct a mock inquiry that would substitute the good name of Lord Bryce for the thousands of missing names of the anonymous victims whose stories appeared in the pages of the report". The commission published its report in May 1915. Charles Masterman, the director of the British War Propaganda Bureau, wrote to Bryce: "Your report has swept America. As you probably know even the most skeptical declare themselves converted, just because it is signed by you!" Translated in ten languages by June, the report was the basis for much subsequent wartime propaganda and was used as a sourcebook for many other publications, ensuring that the atrocities became a leitmotif of the war's propaganda up to the final "Hang the Kaiser" campaign.

Sensational accounts persisted and appeared outside of Britain. For example, in March 1917 Arnold J. Toynbee published in America The German Terror in Belgium, which emphasized the most graphic accounts of "authentic" German sexual depravity, such as: "In the market-place of Gembloux a Belgian despatch-rider saw the body of a woman pinned to the door of a house by a sword driven through her chest. The body was naked and the breasts had been cut off."

Much of the wartime publishing in Britain was in fact aimed at attracting American support. A 1929 article in The Nation asserted: "In 1916 the Allies were putting forth every possible atrocity story to win neutral sympathy and American support. We were fed every day [...] stories of Belgian children whose hands were cut off, the Canadian soldier who was crucified to a barn door, the nurses whose breasts were cut off, the German habit of distilling glycerine and fat from their dead in order to obtain lubricants; and all the rest."

The Germans Arrive, oil on canvas (1918) by American artist George Bellows, depicting a German soldier restraining a Belgian teen whose hands had just been severed.

The fourth Liberty bond drive of 1918 employed a "Remember Belgium" poster depicting the silhouette of a young Belgian girl being dragged by a German soldier on the background of a burning village; historian Kimberly Jensen interprets this imagery as "They are alone in the night, and rape seems imminent. The poster demonstrates that leaders drew on the American public's knowledge of and assumptions about the use of rape in the German invasion of Belgium."

In his book Roosevelt and Hitler, Robert Edwin Herzstein stated that "The Germans could not seem to find a way to counteract powerful British propaganda about the 'Rape of Belgium' and other alleged atrocities". One attempt was the publication of their own atrocity narrative in The German White Book, which included alleged atrocities committed by Belgian civilians against German soldiers. A 1967 investigation by German jurist Hermann Kantorowicz found 75% of documents within the book to be falsified.

About the legacy of the propaganda, Gullace commented that "one of the tragedies of the British effort to manufacture truth is the way authentic suffering was rendered suspect by fabricated tales". However, historian Linda Robertson faults WWII-era revisionism by American isolationists, who aimed to blame US entry into WWI on British propaganda and thus discredit news of Nazi atrocities. Robertson writes that the reaction against propaganda can also "have the effect of obscuring what happened".

== Aftermath ==
=== Death toll ===
The Germans were responsible for the deaths of 23,700 Belgian civilians, (6,000 Belgians murdered, 17,700 died during expulsion, deportation, in prison or sentenced to death by court) and caused further non-fatalities of 10,400 permanent and 22,700 temporary victims, with 18,296 children becoming war orphans. Military losses were 26,338 killed, died from injuries or accidents, 14,029 died from disease, or went missing.

In addition, Germany siphoned off foodstuffs and fertiliser to the German market throughout the occupation. While some amount of Belgian needs were fulfilled by the Commission for Relief in Belgium, the resulting food crisis contributed to an estimated 90,000 indirect excess deaths during the war.

=== Later analysis ===
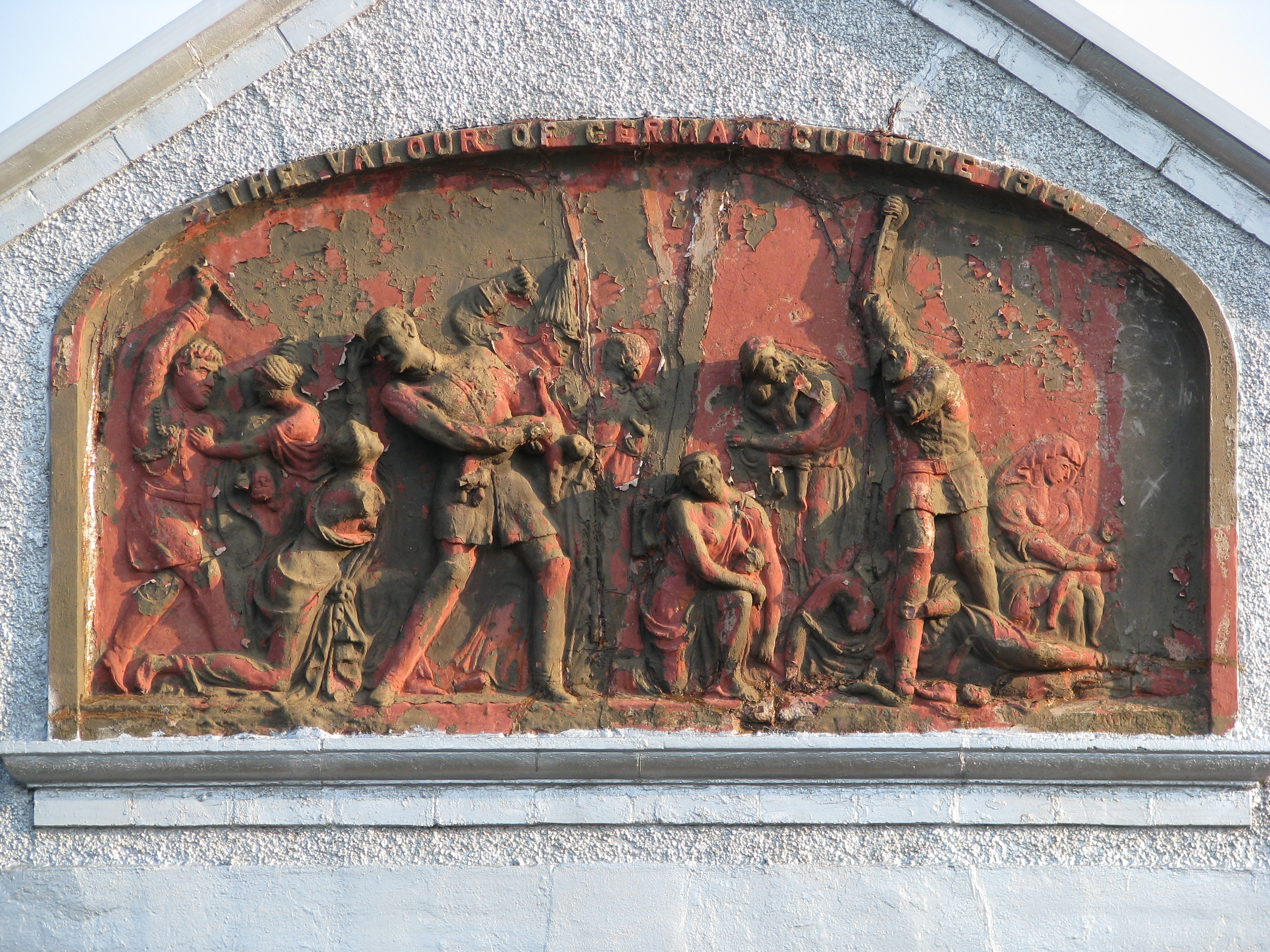
The Valour of German Culture 1914 (aka Kultur Panel), (Note: German Kultur: In late-19th- and early-20th-century German intellectual discourse, Kultur was often used in a value-laden sense to denote deep national and spiritual development, encompassing learning, the arts, moral seriousness, and inner discipline. It was frequently contrasted with Zivilisation ("civilization"), which in nationalist polemics was portrayed as emphasizing outward polish, material progress, and technical refinement. During the First World War, this Kultur–Zivilisation contrast became a prominent rhetorical frame in German public discourse. In Allied commentary, particularly following reports of atrocities committed during the invasion and occupation of Belgium, the term "German Kultur" was widely reappropriated in an ironic or sarcastic sense, juxtaposing claims of cultural superiority with acts condemned as violations of civilian norms and international law. Contemporary artistic responses to the war, including the emergence of Dada (1916) among German-speaking exiles, rejected not only German nationalist claims but the moral authority of European "culture" itself in the context of industrialized warfare.) 1915, terracotta bas-relief by William Baxter (1855–1927), 128 Pitt Street, Bonnington, Edinburgh – depicting eighteen figures: German soldiers ("Huns") committing acts of violence against Belgian civilians, including women and children. One soldier is wearing an Iron Cross.

In the 1920s, the war crimes of August 1914 were often dismissed as British propaganda. Later, numerous scholars have examined the original documents and concluded that large-scale atrocities did occur, while acknowledging that other stories were fabrications. There is a debate between those who believe the German army acted primarily out of paranoia, in retaliation for real or believed incidents involving resistance actions by Belgian civilians, and those (including Lipkes) who emphasize additional causes, suggesting an association with German actions in the Nazi era.

According to Larry Zuckerman, the German occupation far exceeded the constraints international law imposed on an occupying power. A heavy-handed German military administration sought to regulate every detail of daily life, both on a personal level with travel restraints and collective punishment, and on the economic level by harnessing the Belgian industry to German advantage and by levying repeated massive indemnities on the Belgian provinces. Before the war Belgium produced 4.4 percent of world commerce. More than 100,000 Belgian workers were forcibly deported to Germany to work in the war economy, and to Northern France to build roads and other military infrastructure for the German army.

=== Historical studies ===
Recent in-depth historical studies of German acts in Belgium include:

- The Rape of Belgium: The Untold Story of World War I by Larry Zuckerman
- Rehearsals: The German Army in Belgium, August 1914 by Jeff Lipkes
- German Atrocities 1914: A History of Denial by John Horne and Alan Kramer.
- Schuldfragen. Belgischer Untergrundkrieg und deutsche Vergeltung im August 1914 by Ulrich Keller

Horne and Kramer describe some of the motivations for German tactics, chiefly (but not only), the collective fear of a "People's War" (Volkskrieg):

The source of the collective fantasy of the People's War and of the harsh reprisals with which the German army (up to its highest level) responded are to be found in the memory of the Franco-Prussian War of 1870–1, when the German armies faced irregular Republican soldiers (or francs-tireurs), and in the way in which the spectre of civilian involvement in warfare conjured up the worst fears of democratic and revolutionary disorder for a conservative officer corps.

The same authors identify a number of contributory factors:

- inexperience leading to lack of discipline amongst German soldiers
- drunkenness
- 'friendly fire' incidents arising from panic
- frequent collisions with Belgian and French rearguards leading to confusion
- rage at the stubborn and initially-successful defense of Liège during the Battle of Liège
- rage at the slightest Belgian resistance, because they were not seen as a people entitled to defend themselves
- prevailing animosity towards Roman Catholicism among elements of the German army
- ambiguous or inadequate German field service regulations regarding civilians
- failure of German logistics later leading to uncontrolled looting

Recent studies conducted by Ulrich Keller have put the reasoning of Horne and Kramer into question. Keller claims that the reason for the brutal German behavior in the first few months of the invasion was due to the existence of a substantial Belgian partisan movement. He claims the organized resistance was led by the Garde Civique. As evidence he points to German medical records which show a substantial number of German soldiers wounded by shotguns (Note: This had been previously observed in Read (1941) pp. 94, giving the number of shotgun wounds according to German sources as 108.) which were neither in use by the Germans nor by French nor Belgian rearguard units, as well as testimony from German soldiers and regimental war diaries.

Keller's claims have led to an argument among historians which led to a conference being held in 2017 in which his claims met with a mixed response. While the evidence provided by Keller may hint at a more than merely sporadic resistance by irregular Belgian fighters, historians criticised his selection of sources and argued the need for additional research, particularly on the Belgian role in 1914 and the key question how widespread the irregular resistance had been, to make his case.

Further critique was subsequently published by Horne and Kramer. A more ambivalent review was written by Markus Pöhlmann, who critiques both Horne and Kramer, and Keller for being overly one-sided in their use of and trust in sources. (Belgian civilians in the former case, German military sources in the latter). Pöhlmann writes that Keller misunderstood the Belgian military disposition at the start of WWI in his conclusion of organised resistance, arguing that widespread spontaneous civilian involvement (and German confusion regarding actions taken by Belgian or French military units) was more likely, and that Keller was overly zealous in downplaying the scale of German atrocities. However, he states that the key argument from Horne and Kramer, that German fear was an irrational leftover from the Franco-Prussian war, was unconvincing. German military order did collapse in an unprecedented way, but this was influenced by the stress of their experiences with a hostile Belgian population. Outside Germany, the majority of international scholars reject Keller's work due to his "uncritical and selective" use of sources.

=== Legacy ===
At a commemoration ceremony on 6 May 2001, in the Belgian town of Dinant, attended by Belgium's defense minister Andre Flahaut, World War II veterans, and the ambassadors of Germany, France and Britain, state secretary of the German Ministry of Defence, Walter Kolbow, officially apologized for a massacre of 674 civilians that took place on 23 August 1914, in the aftermath of the Battle of Dinant:

We have to recognize the injustices that were committed, and ask forgiveness. That is what I am doing with a deep conviction today. I apologise to you all for the injustice the Germans committed in this town.

Mr. Kolbow placed a wreath and bowed before a monument to the victims bearing the inscription: To the 674 Dinantais martyrs, innocent victims of German barbarism.

== See also ==
- Destruction of Kalisz (1914)
- German war crimes
- Herero and Namaqua genocide (1904–1907) – an earlier atrocity in German South West Africa (now Namibia)
- Maji Maji Rebellion (1905–1907) – a rebellion against colonial rule in German East Africa (now Tanzania) which was suppressed through scorched-earth tactics
- Leipzig War Crimes Trials
- Manifesto of the Ninety-Three – a proclamation endorsed by 93 prominent German intellectuals in 1914 in support of German military actions.
- Kamerun campaign atrocities

== Bibliography ==
=== Inline references ===
- Associated Press: "Germany Apologizes for WWI Massacre".
1. Via –Tuscaloosa News (Google Books). Vol. 183, no. 127. 7 May 2001. p. 8 (section A) → digital image 5. LCCN sn89-50026; OCLC 18329797 (all editions).
- Beckett, Ian Frederick William [at Wikidata], ed. (1988). The Roots of Counter-Insurgency: Armies and Guerrilla Warfare, 1900-1945. London: Blanford Press. p. 62. LCCN 88-203646; ISBN 978-0-7137-1922-2, 0-7137-1922-2; OCLC 22910593 (all editions).
1. Bennett, Matthew. Chapter 3: "The German Experience". pp. 60–82.
  1. Via Internet Archive (Kahle/Austin Foundation; Fulton County Library System).
- Bülow, Bernhard von (1849–1929) (1932). Memoirs of Prince Von Bülow (4 Vols.). Translated by Geoffrey Dunlop (1894–1947) and Frederick Augustus Voigt (1892–1957). Boston: Little, Brown and Company. LCCN 77-127900; LCCN 31-15717.
1. Vol. 3: The World War and Germany's Collapse, 1909–1919.
  1. Via Internet Archive (Kansas City Public Library).
- Cook, Bernard A. (2005) [2004, 2002]. Belgium: A History. Series: Studies in Modern European History. Vol. 50. New York: Peter Lang. LCCN 2001-50655; ISBN 978-0-8204-5824-3, 0-8204-5824-4 (hardcover), ISBN 978-0-8204-7647-6, 0-8204-7647-1 (paperback); ISSN 0893-6897 (series); OCLC 54697348 (all editions).
1. 2nd ed.. 2002.
  1. Via Google Books (limited preview).
2. 3rd ed.. 2004.
- De Schaepdrijver, Sophie (2014). "Violence and Legitimacy: Occupied Belgium, 1914–1918". The Low Countries: Arts and Society in Flanders and the Netherlands. 22: 46–56. OCLC 948603897.
- Dumoulin, Michel (2010). L'Entrée dans le XX^{e} Siècle, 1905–1918 [The Beginning of the XX Century, 1905–1918]. Nouvelle Histoire de Belgique (French ed.). Brussels: Le Cri édition. ISBN 978-2-8710-6545-6.
- Europe: Culture and Identities in a Contested Continent. Milton Keynes, England: The Open University.
1. Book 3 (2003). Emsley, Clive (1944–2020) (ed.). War, Culture and Memory. p. 28. ISBN 978-0-7492-9611-7, 0-7492-9611-9 (paperback); OCLC 81880979 (all editions), 971415484, 1110234867.
- Frankfurter Allgemeine Zeitung; Kramer, Alan Richard [in German]; Horne, John (1 March 2018). "Wer schießt hier aus dem Hinterhalt?" ["Who Is Firing from Ambush?"] (in German) (blog ed.). Archived from the original on 4 March 2018.
- Guardian (The); Osborn, Andrew (11 May 2001). Belgians Want Money After German War Apology (181st year, Whole no. 48106). London. p. 13 (columns 1–3; bottom). Archived from the original on 25 August 2013. ISSN 0261-3077 (print), ISSN 1756-3224 (online); OCLC 60623878 (all editions)
1. Via Guardian blog. Archived from the original on 25 August 2013.
2. Via Newspapers.com.
- Gullace, Nicoletta Florence, PhD (maiden; born 1961) (2002). The Blood of Our Sons: Men, Women, and the Renegotiation of British Citizenship During the Great War (1st ed.). Palgrave Macmillan. LCCN 2002-16917; ISBN 978-0-3122-9446-5, 0-3122-9446-8, ISBN 978-1-4039-6710-7, 1-4039-6710-5; OCLC 48857552 (all editions).
1. Via Internet Archive (University of Nottingham; withdrawn; borrow unavailable; limited preview).
- Hersch, Liebmann (1882–1955) (1927). Gini, Corrado (1884–1965) (ed.). "La Mortalité Causée par la Guerre Mondiale" [Mortality Caused by the World War (1914–1918)]. Metron (in 4 languages: English, French, German, Italian). 7 (1). The International Review of Statistics: 3–82. LCCN 29-25401, LCCN 29-25401, LCCN 95-131249, LCCN 33-22953; ISSN 0026-1424 (journal); OCLC 1605830 (all editions) (journal), OCLC 494381913 (article).
1. Via Google Books (Michigan).
- Herzstein, Robert Edwin (1940–2015) [in French] (1989). Roosevelt & Hitler – Prelude to War. Paragon House. p. 8. LCCN 89-33922; ISBN 978-1-5577-8021-8, 1-5577-8021-8; OCLC 19741962 (all editions).
- Horne, John N. [in German]; Kramer, Alan Richard (1994). "German 'Atrocities' and Franco-German Opinion, 1914: The Evidence of German Soldiers' Diaries". Journal of Modern History. 66 (1): 1–33. doi:10.1086/244776. ISSN 0022-2801. JSTOR 2124390. S2CID 154171062.
- Horne, John N. (born 1949); Kramer, Alan Richard (born 1954) [in German] (2001). German Atrocities, 1914: A History of Denial. Newhaven: Yale University Press. LCCN 2001-26884; ISBN 978-0-3000-8975-2, 0-3000-8975-9, ISBN 978-0-3001-0791-3, 0-3001-0791-9; OCLC 47181922 (all editions)
1. Via Internet Archive (Boston Public Library).
2. Via Google Books (limited preview).
Book summary. Series: First World War History Resources. Publisher: World Wide Web Virtual Library. 2005. Archived from the original on 11 June 2007. OCLC 1069445533.
- Horne, John (12 December 2008). "German War-Crimes [in Belgium and France, August-October 1914]". Conference paper given at the Unquiet Graves Conference at Ieper, Belgium, 20 May 2000. Archived from the original on 12 December 2008.
- Hull, Isabel Virginia (born 1949) (2014). A Scrap of Paper: Breaking and Making International Law during the Great War. Cornell University Press. p. 157. LCCN 2013-42450; ISBN 978-0-8014-7064-6, 0-8014-7064-1.
1. Via Google Books (limited preview).
- "Inventaris Onroerend Erfgoed" – "Hoofdbibliotheek van de Katholieke Universiteit Leuven" ["Inventory of Immovable Heritage" – "Main Library of the Catholic University of Leuven" (as it existed in 1914)]. Agentschap Onroerend Erfgoed [Flemish Government]; Agency for Immovable Heritage. 2020. Archived from the original on 6 February 2020.

- Kimberly Jensen. Mobilizing Minerva: American Women in the First World War. University of Illinois Press. p. 30. LCCN 2007-20857; ISBN 978-0-2520-7496-7, 0-2520-7496-3 (paperback), ISBN 978-0-2520-3237-0, 0-2520-3237-3 (cloth, paper),
1. Via Internet Archive (Kahle/Austin Foundation).
- Kantorowicz, Hermann (1877–1940) (1967). Geiss, Imanuel (ed.). Gutachten zur Kriegsschuldfrage 1914 [Report on the War Guilt Question 1914] (in German). Frankfurt am Main: Europäische Verlagsanstalt. Retrieved 4 October 2020. ISBN 978-3-8639-3621-1, 3-8639-3621-3; OCLC 654661194 (all editions).
1. Via Google Books.
- Keller, Ulrich [in German] (2017). Schuldfragen : Belgischer Untergrundkrieg und deutsche Vergeltung im August 1914 [Questions of Guilt: Belgian Underground Warfare and German Retaliation in August 1914] (in German). Paderborn: Ferdinand Schöningh. ISBN 978-3-5067-8744-6, 3-5067-8744-6; ISBN 978-3-6577-8744-9, 3-6577-8744-5; OCLC 987575647 (all editions); DNB-IDN 1131889983, DNB-IDN 1141232405.
- Kossmann, Ernst Heinrich (1922–2003) (1978). The Low Countries, 1780–1940. Series: Oxford History of Modern Europe (1st ed.). Oxford University Press. LCCN 77-30291; ISBN 978-0-1982-2108-1, 0-1982-2108-8; OCLC 3447148 (all editions).
1. Chapter 9: "War" – "Belgium, 1914–1918". pp. 517–544 – via Internet Archive (Kahle/Austin Foundation; Bexley Public Library).
p. 528.

p. 529.

pp. 533–534 (p. 533 – 1st paragraph: "During the first years of the war ...". p. 534 – contextual support).
- Kramer, Alan Richard [in German] (2007). Dynamic of Destruction: Culture and Mass Killing in the First World War (The Making of the Modern World). Oxford University Press. pp. 1–24. LCCN 2007-10307; ISBN 978-0-1928-0342-9, 0-1928-0342-5; OCLC 85833457 (all editions).
1. Via Internet Archive.
- Lauwers, Delphine (2020). "From Belgium to the Hague via Berlin and Moscow: Documenting War Crimes and the Quest for International Justice, 1919–2019". Archives and Manuscripts. 48 (2). Australian Society of Archivists. Routledge: 216–236. doi:10.1080/01576895.2020.1753543 LCCN 2011-202546; ISSN 0157-6895 (print), ISSN 2164-6058 (online); OCLC 224491143 (all editions) (publication), OCLC 9071150235 (article).
- Life; Walker, Alanson Burton (1878–1947), cartoonist [at Wikidata] (29 July 1915). Cartoon of a German soldier carrying impaled bodies of Belgian civilians on his bayonet – man, woman holding a newborn, and two children. Vol. 66, no. 1709. p. 206.
1. Via Internet Archive (SIM Box ID & Canister no.: IA1529716-03). IA Collection: SIM Microfilm; Periodicals; Pub Life.
- Ministère de l'Intérieur et de l'Hygiène. Annuaire Statistique de la Belgique et du Congo Belge [Ministry of the Interior and Public Health. Statistical Yearbook of Belgium and the Belgian Congo] (in French). Vol. 46 – Vol. 50 (1915–1919). Brussels: A. Lesigne Printing House. 1922. p. 100. LCCN 49-36129; ISSN 0770-2221; OCLC 11437547 (all editions), OCLC 32916623 (all editions).
1. 1re partie : années 1914–1918: II. "Renseignements Spéciaux Concernant la Période de Guerre". B. "Dommages de Guerre". "Dommages aux Personnes" : "Pertes de l'Armée et de la Population Civile; Évaluation" [Part 1, Years 1914–1918: II. "Special Information Concerning the Wartime Period" B. "War Damages". "Damages to Persons": "Losses of the Army and of the Civilian Population; Assessment"]. p. 100.
  1. Via HathiTrust (University of Minnesota).
  2. Via Google Books (Cornell).
26,338 = 1,164 + 25,174 (Killed or died of wounds/accidents: officers + enlisted)

14,029 = 407 + 13,622 (Died of disease or missing: officers + enlisted)

40,367 = 26,338 + 14,029 (Total military losses)
- 1914–1918 Online: International Encyclopedia of the First World War. OCLC 893484519 (all editions) & 1091549329.
1. Vrints, Antoon [at Wikidata] (8 October 2014). "Food and Nutrition (Belgium)". Archived from the original on 19 November 2015.
2. Dülffer, Jost [in German] (21 July 2020). "Centenary (Historiography)". Archived from the original on 11 July 2024.
- Pöhlmann, Markus [in German] (2017). "Habent sua fata libelli. Zur Auseinandersetzung um das Buch German Atrocities 1914" [Books Have Their Own Fates: On the Controversy Surrounding the Book German Atrocities 1914] (PDF). Portal Militärgeschichte (in German). Archived (PDF) from the original on 23 April 2018.
1. Horne, John N. (born 1949); Kramer, Alan Richard (born 1954) [in German] (2001). German Atrocities, 1914: A History of Denial. Newhaven: Yale University Press. LCCN 2001-26884; ISBN 978-0-3000-8975-2, 0-3000-8975-9, ISBN 978-0-3001-0791-3, 0-3001-0791-9; OCLC 47181922 (all editions)
  1. Via Internet Archive (Boston Public Library).
  2. Via Google Books (limited preview).
- Rapports et Documents d'Enquête [Reports and Documentary Evidence]. "Relevé Alphabétique par Province des Localités Citées dans le Rapport, avec Indication des Principaux Attentats qui y Ont Été Commis" [Alphabetical Listing by Province of the Localities Cited in the Report, with an Indication of the Principal Atrocities Committed There]. Vol. 1 (of 4). Commission d'Enquete [Commission of Inquiry]. OCLC 820928791 (all editions) (Gale online), 903726424, 1346705456, 713851845, 603812795.
1. Book 1. 1922. pp. 605–615 – via HathiTrust (Cal Berkeley).
2. Book 2. 1923. pp. 679–704 – via Google Books (University of Chicago).
- Read, James Morgan (1908–1985) (1941). Atrocity Propaganda, 1914–1919. New Haven: Yale University Press. pp. 204–207. LCCN 41-24133, LCCN a46002511 (1945 reprint), LCCN 72-4676 (1972 reprint by Arno Press); ISBN 978-0-4050-4760-2, 0-4050-4760-6 (1972 reprint by Arno Press); OCLC 1160768 (all editions), OCLC 1162072 (all editions).
1. Via Internet Archive (Mills College; withdrawn).
- Robertson, Linda (née Linda Raine Lesser; born 1946) (2007). Comment on "The Bryce Report", aka "The Bryce Commission's Findings on German Atrocities in Belgium, 1915". Brigham Young University Library; World War I Archive (blog). Archived from the original on 7 December 2007.
- Scianna, Bastian Matteo (27 October 2017). "German Atrocities 1914 – Revisited". Geschichte im Netz [History on the Web]. Kommunikation und Fachinformation für die Geschichtswissenschaften [Communication and Specialized Information for the Historical Sciences] (in German). Sönke Neitzel, University of Potsdam; Oliver Janz, Free University of Berlin; Peter Hoeres, University of Würzburg. H-Soz-u-Kult = abbreviation for Historische Sozial- und Kulturwissenschaften (Historical Social and Cultural Studies). Archived from the original on 22 December 2017. ISSN 0172-6404.
- Slater, Tom (2005). Heritage Slater Political and Americana Memorabilia Auction: Poster: "Remember Belgium" (Catalog no. 619). Slater, Tom, Dixey, Marsh and Halperin, James L. Poster is by Ellsworth Young (1866–1952). Dallas: Heritage Auctions, Inc. p. 317 – via Google Books (limited preview). ISBN 978-1-5996-7012-6, 1-5996-7012-7.
- Tuchman, Barbara Wertheim (1912–1989) (1962). The Guns of August. New York: Macmillan Publishing Co. pp. 340–356. LCCN 62-7515; ISBN 978-0-0262-0310-4, 0-0262-0310-3; OCLC 192333 (all editions).
1. Via Internet Archive (borrow unavailable; limited preview).
2. In Dutch via Internet Archive (Openbare Bibliotheek Amsterdam).
3. Via Google Books (limited preview).
- Wagener, Hans [in German]; Schneider, Thomas F., eds. (2007). "Huns" vs. "Corned Beef": Representations of the Other in American and German Literature and Film on World War I. V&R unipress GmbH. ISBN 978-3-8997-1385-5, 3-8997-1385-0; OCLC 137248696 (all editions).
1. Wachtel, Cynthia. "Representations of German Soldiers in American World War I Literature". One of nine papers presented at an international and interdisciplinary symposium held on the UCLA campus in Los Angeles, Oct. 13–14, 2006. p. 68 from pps. 65–74.
  1. Via HathiTrust (limited search only).
- Young, [Milton] Ellsworth (1866–1952), artist (1918). "Remember Belgium – Buy Bonds" (20" × 30" poster). Fourth Liberty Loan. U.S. Treasury Department, Bureau of Publicity (publisher). New York and Norwood, Ohio: United States Printing and Lithograph Company (printer) → Diamond Match Company, in 1957, merged with Gardner Board and Carton Company to form Diamond-Gardner. In 1959 it merged with U.S. Printing and Lithograph Company to form Diamond National Corporation. Then, in 1964, it became Diamond International Corporation. See Diamond Match Company. LCCN 96-507603; OCLC 1358623318, 1004851147, 894258151, 914494740, 1256447805, 1089912627.
- Zuckerman, Larry (2004). The Rape of Belgium: The Untold Story of World War I. New York University Press. pp. 132–136. LCCN 2003-15217; ISBN 978-0-8147-9704-4, 0-8147-9704-0.
1. Via Internet Archive (Kansas City Public Library; withdrawn).
2. Via Google Books (limited preview).
3. Via Google Books (limited preview).

=== General references ===
- Albertini, Luigi (1875–1941); Magrini, Luciano (1885–1957) [in Italian], eds. (1952–1957). Origins of the War of 1914 (3 Vols.). Translated and ed. by Isabella Mellis Massey (1880–1966). Oxford University Press. 1980 Reprint, Westport, Connecticut: Greenwood Press. LCCN 80-12769; ISBN 0-3132-2401-3 (set).
1. Vol. 1 (1952): European Relations From the Congress of Berlin to the Eve of the Sarajevo Murder. ISBN 0-3132-2402-1.
2. Vol. 2 (1953): The Crisis of July 1914. From the Sarajevo Outrage to the Austro-Hungarian General Mobilization. ISBN 0-3132-2403-X.
  1. Via Internet Archive.
3. Vol. 3 (1957): The Epilogue of the Crisis of July 1914. The Declarations of War and of Neutrality. ISBN 978-0-3132-2404-1, 0-3132-2404-8.
- Bertrand, J. (1921) [1919]. "Le martyre de la province de Liège en 1914" ["The Martyrdom of the Province of Liège in 1914"] (originally published as 2 pamphlets, 16 pages each) (in French). Cover illustrated by Edmond Van Offel (1871–1959). Borgerhout, Antwerp: Imprimerie nationale L. Opdebeek [National Printing House, L. Opdebeek] → Lode Opdebeek (1869–1930). OCLC 1400716792 (all editions).
1. Via 2013 reprint (in French). Published by Eglise romane de Tohogne [Romanesque Church of Tohogne].
2. Pdf of original – via Royal Library of Belgium (Koninklijke Bibliotheek van België; abbreviated as KBR). KBR 16307238.
  1. "Avant-propos" ["Forward"]. pp. 2–3.
  2. "Baelen". pp. 3–4.
  3. "Barchon". pp. 4–6.
  4. "Berneau". pp. 6–7.
  5. "Blégny-Trembleur". pp. 7–10.
  6. "Herve". p. 10.
  7. "Louveigné". pp. 10–12.
  8. "Magnée". pp. 12–13.
  9. "Melen". p. 13.
  10. "Olne". pp. 13–15.
  11. "Soumagne". pp. 15–17.
  12. "Retinne". p. 17.
  13. Pamphlet N° 2 begins at p. 18
  14. "Retinne" (continued). p. 18.
  15. "Sprimont". pp. 18–19.
  16. "Visé". pp. 19–22.
  17. "Wandre". pp. 22–26.
  18. "Warsage". pp. 26–27.
  19. "Haccourt". pp. 27–28.
  20. "Hermée". p. 28.
  21. "Heure-le-Romain". pp. 28–29.
  22. "Liège". pp. 29–32.
  23. "Ils ont agi par ordre" ["They Acted on Orders"]. p. 32.
- Bryce, James (1838–1922), ed. (1915). Report of the Committee on Alleged German Outrages. London: Committee on Alleged German Outrages. H.M. Stationery Office. Reprinted in 1915 in New York: MacMillan and Company – via Internet Archive. Retrieved February 17, 2015. LCCN a15002713; OCLC 810710978 (all editions).
1. "Evidence and Documents Laid Before the Committee on ... " – via HathiTrust (Library of Congress).
2. "Report of the Committee on ... " – via Internet Archive (UMass Boston).
3. "Report of the Committee on ... " (PDF) – via Wikimedia Commons (USC Libraries).
4. "Report of the Committee on ... " – via Google Books (Cal Berkeley).
- Fischer, Fritz (1908–1999) (1967). Germany's Aims in the First World War. London: Chatto & Windus. New York: W.W. Norton. pp. 67, 103, 170, 192–5, 215–224, 283. LCCN 64-23876, LCCN 67-106678; ISBN 0-3930-5347-4 (cloth cover), ISBN 978-0-3930-9798-6, 0-3930-9798-6 (paperback), ISBN 978-0-7011-0693-5, 0-7011-0693-X (1977 reprint); OCLC 2605510 (all editions), 721313864.

1. Via Internet Archive.
2. Via Internet Archive (Trent University).
Originally published in Germany → Fischer, Fritz (1908–1999) (1961). Griff nach der Weltmacht – Die Kriegszielpolitik des kaiserlichen Deutschland 1914/18 [Reach for World Power – Imperial Germany's War Aims, 1914–1918] (in German). Düsseldorf: Droste Verlag und Druckerei GmbH – via Internet Archive (Kahle/Austin Foundation). LCCN 62-46856, LCCN 65-77404 (3rd ed.; 1964); OCLC 896545978 (all editions).
- Fox, Frank (1915). The Agony of Belgium – Being Phase I of the Great War. London: Hutchinson & Co.
1. Via HathiTrust (Wisconsin).
2. Via Internet Archive (Wisconsin).
- Gibson, Hugh Simons (1883–1954). A Diplomatic Diary.
1. English: A Diplomatic Diary (3 sources via HathiTrust). London, New York, Toronto: Hodder and Stoughton. Doubleday, Page and Company. 1917. LCCN 17-29362; OCLC 405884 (all editions).
  1. Via Internet Archive (UC Riverside).
2. français: La Belgique pendant la guerre [Journal From Our Legation in Belgium]. Translated from English by Louis Marie Alexandre d'Ursel (1886–1969). Paris: Librairie Hachette et Compagnie. 1918. BnF 32163562q; LCCN 19-7499; OCLC 1176986156 (all editions).
  1. Via BnF (Bibliothèque nationale de France, département Philosophie, histoire, sciences de l'homme, 8-M-18585).
  2. Via HathiTrust (UCLA).
The contents of this book were first published in the New York Tribune as a continuous daily series of thirty-six installments, appearing without interruption from 4 November 1917 through 9 December 1917 (Vol. 7: issue nos. 25921–25956). The datelines were from Brussels, July 4, 1914, through December 10, 1914. The series was published under the collective title, The Rape of Belgium – A Journal of the American Legation at Belgium – The Diary of Hugh Gibson, Witness. It was copyrighted in 1917 by Doubleday, Page & Company by Otis Fenner Wood (1868–1939), whose father, Fernando Wood (1812–1881), was, twice, Mayor of New York City – from 1855 to 1857 and from 1860 to 1861.
Each installment carried the following subheading (with slight variations):
"The secretary of the American Legation in Belgium, seeing everything, kept a personal diary of Germany's immortal sin. The seal of neutrality is broken, and here is one of the great documents of the war."
The author, Hugh Gibson, served as Secretary of the United States Legation in Brussels from 1914 to 1916, during the early years of the German occupation of Belgium. The United States subsequently elevated its Mission in Brussels to the status of an Embassy in 1919.
- Green, Leanne (PhD).
1. "Advertising War: Picturing Belgium in First World War Publicity". Media, War & Conflict (quarterly). 7 (3). Sage: 309–325. December 2014.
2. Publication: LCCN 2008-254017; ISSN 1750-6360, ISSN 1750-6352; OCLC 228110138 (all editions), 643111977.
  Article: doi:10.1177/1750635214557534; S2CID 144471627; JSTOR 26001042; OCLC 9990293954, 1051909013.
3. Presented at the 2013 Memory Conflict and Space Conference at Liverpool Hope University.
4. "Advertising War: Pictorial Publicity, 1914–1918" (PhD dissertation). Manchester Metropolitan University. 2015. OCLC 1367107655, 1065390328.
  1. Pdf via Manchester Metropolitan University (PDF). Archived (PDF) from the original on 19 April 2023.
- Gullace, Nicoletta Florence, PhD (maiden; born 1961) (September 2011). "Allied Propaganda and World War I: Interwar Legacies, Media Studies, and the Politics of War Guilt". History Compass. 9 (9). John Wiley & Sons, Inc.: 686–700. LCCN 2007-252533; ISSN 1478-0542 (print), ISSN 1478-0542 (online); doi:10.1111/j.1478-0542.2011.00798.x; ProQuest 1766827852; OCLC 949804183 (all editions) (publication), OCLC 5151220678 (article).
- Haygood, Lisa (9 May 2016). "The Lilies of Belgium: The Critical Role of National Resistance at the Start of the Great War". Kai Evers, PhD, academic advisor. Thesis in Partial Completion of the Certification Requirements for the Honors Program of the School of Humanities: UC Irvine.
1. In Part 2: "L'Exécution des Notables de Blégny" (PDF). pp. 69–.
- Jones, Heather (August 2014). "The Great War: How 1914–1918 Changed the Relationship Between War and Civilians". RUSI Journal. 159 (4): 84–91. LCCN 92-641693 (journal); ISSN 0307-1847 (journal, print), ISSN 1744-0378 (journal, web); OCLC 913566647 (all editions) (journal); doi:10.1080/03071847.2014.946698 (article); S2CID 153631019 (article), OCLC 6894650310 (article).
- Lipkes, Jeff [in Dutch] (2007). Rehearsals: The German Army in Belgium, August 1914. Leuven University Press. doi:10.2307/j.ctt9qf0b6; JSTOR j.ctt9qf0b6; Project MUSE book 24396 ISBN 978-9-0586-7596-5, 9-0586-7596-3, ISBN 978-9-4616-6039-8, 9-4616-6039-1; OCLC 1021283616 (all editions).
1. Via Google Books (limited preview).
- Nelson, Robert L. (2004). "Ordinary Men in the First World War? German Soldiers as Victims and Participants". Journal of Contemporary History. 39 (3): 425–435. doi:10.1177/0022009404044448. ISSN 0022-0094. JSTOR 3180736. S2CID 162374776.
Reviewed works:
1. Jahr, Christoph [in German] (1998). Gewöhnliche Soldaten: Desertion und Deserteure im deutschen und britischen Heer 1914–1918 [Ordinary Soldiers: Desertion and Deserters in the German and British Armies 1914–1918]. Series: Kritische Studien zur Geschichtswissenschaft, Nr. 123 [Critical Studies in Historiography, no. 123] (in German). Göttingen: Vandenhoeck & Ruprecht. LCCN 98-220444; ISBN 978-3-5253-5786-6, 3-5253-5786-9; OCLC 39873715 (all editions).
2. Latzel, Klaus [in German] (1998). Deutsche Soldaten, nationalsozialistischer Krieg? Kriegserlebnis, Kriegserfahrung 1939–1945 [German Soldiers, National Socialist War? War Experience, Wartime Experiences 1939–1945] (in German). Paderborn: Verlag Ferdinand Schöningh. LCCN 98-210118; ISBN 978-3-5067-4470-8, 3-5067-4470-4; OCLC 40305849 (all editions).
3. Reimann, Aribert [in German]. Der Grosse Krieg der Sprachen: Untersuchungen zur historischen Semantik in Deutschland und England zur Zeit des Ersten Weltkriegs [The Great War of Languages: Studies in Historical Semantics in Germany and England During the First World War] (in German). Essen: Klartext Verlag. LCCN 2002-399186; ISBN 978-3-8847-4858-9, 3-8847-4858-0; OCLC 45741743 (all editions).
4. Ulrich, Bernd [in German]. Die Augenzeugen: Deutsche Feldpostbriefe in Kriegs- und Nachkriegszeit 1914–1933 [The Eyewitnesses: German Field Post Letters in the War and Post-War Period 1914–1933] (in German). Essen: Klartext Verlag. LCCN 98-158594; ISBN 978-3-8847-4590-8, 3-8847-4590-5; OCLC 38287291 (all editions).
5. Ziemann, Benjamin (1997). Front und Heimat: Ländliche Kriegserfahrungen im südlichen Bayern 1914–1923 [Front and Home Front: Rural War Experiences in Southern Bavaria 1914–1923] (in German). Essen: Klartext Verlag. OCLC 98101911 (all editions); ISBN 978-3-8847-4547-2, 3-8847-4547-6; OCLC 37034889 (all editions).
- 1914–1918 Online: International Encyclopedia of the First World War. OCLC 893484519 (all editions) & 1091549329.
1. Wegner, Larissa (8 October 2014). "Occupation During the War (Belgium and France)". Archived from the original on 3 May 2015.
2. Debruyne, Emmanuel (8 June 2016). "Intimate Relations Between Occupiers and Occupied (Belgium and France)". Archived from the original on 1 March 2017.
3. Kramer, Alan Richard [in German] (24 January 2017). "Atrocities". Archived from the original on 1 March 2017.
- Scheipers, Sibylle (2015). Unlawful Combatants: A Genealogy of the Irregular Fighter. Oxford University Press. LCCN 2014-942232; ISBN 978-0-1996-4611-1, 0-1996-4611-2.
1. Via Google Books (limited preview).
- Spraul, Gunter [in German] (2016). Der Franktireurkrieg 1914. Untersuchungen zum Verfall einer Wissenschaft und zum Umgang mit nationalen Mythen [The Franc-Tireur War of 1914: Studies on the Decline of a Scholarly Field and the Treatment of National Myths] (in German). Frank & Timme. ISSN 1860-1960; ISBN 978-3-7329-0242-2, 3-7329-0242-0; OCLC 945181231 (all editions).
1. Via Google Books (limited preview).
- Wilson, Vale Trevor (1928–2022) (July 1979). "Lord Bryce's Investigation into Alleged German Atrocities in Belgium, 1914–1915". Journal of Contemporary History (Wilson sees the Bryce report as exaggerated propaganda). 14 (3): 369–383. doi:10.1177/002200947901400301; ISSN 0022-0094 (journal); JSTOR 260012 (article); S2CID 159629719 (article); OCLC 9970723098 (article).
