= Arno Press =

Publishing company

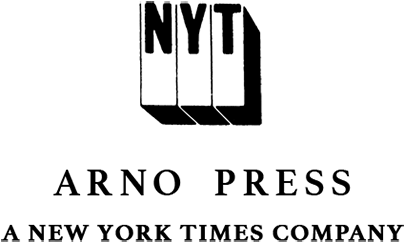
- Founded: 1963
- Founder: Arnold Zohn
- Country of origin: United States
- Headquarters location: 3 Park Avenue; New York, New York 10017
- Distribution: Worldwide
- Publication types: Books, historical reprints
- Owner: The New York Times

Arno Press was a Manhattan-based publishing house founded by Arnold Zohn in 1963, specializing in reprinting rare and long out-of-print materials.

== History ==
Zohn served 48 missions on a bomber crew during World War II, and when he returned home he entered the publishing world. He became vice-president of The New York Times, and later created his own publishing house, Arno Press, in 1963. From the beginning, Zohn's business strategy was to reprint hardcover volumes of historical works and sell large orders to the then-growing number of libraries around the country. In 1968, The New York Times purchased a controlling 51% of Arno Press, and in 1971 they purchased the rest.

On September 23, 1970, the Carnegie Endowment for International Peace formally presented the United Nations with a five-volume series set, Issues Before the General Assemblies of the United Nations (1946-1965), published by Arno Press. Arnold Zohn attended the ceremony on behalf of Arno Press in the General Secretary's conference room. Joseph E. Johnson represented the Carnegie Endowment in his capacity as president, and Secretary General U Thant accepted the material on behalf of the United Nations.

Herbert Cohen was named president of Arno Press on July 14, 1975, in an announcement by Sydney Gruson, executive vice-president of The New York Times Company. He had previously served as executive vice-president of Arno Press since he joined the company in May 1972, and before that he was with Xerox Corporation's American Education Publications.

The firm continued as part of Times Books in 1980, reducing its output. In 1982 many of its titles were sold by Merrimack Book Service. The imprint was licensed to Random House in 1984, then to the Henry Holt division of Macmillan in 2000.

The Arno Press imprint was discontinued "around 1984."

== Legacy ==
In their book American Woman, Italian Style: Italian Americana's Best Writings on Women, Carol Bonomo Albright and Christine Palamidessi Moore praised Arno Press for the "impressive and valuable array of materials on Italian Americans in the United States" in its thirty-nine-volume series, The Italian American Experience.

Princeton English Professor Autumn Womack notes that Arno Press embarked on a "landmark republication project, The American Negro: His History and Literature" which "reissued hundreds of titles by and about Black life" between 1968-1971.

== Selected book series ==
- Abercrombie & Fitch Library
- Addiction in America: Drug Abuse & Alcoholism
- Afro-American Culture Series (Series editor: Ulysses Lee)
- America and the Holy Land
- America in Two Centuries: An Inventory
- American Business Abroad: Origins and Development of the Multinational Corporation (Advisor editor: Stuart Bruchey)
- American Education: Its Men, Ideas & Institutions Series
- American Ethnic Groups Series
- American Farmers and the Rise of Agribusiness
- The American Immigration Collection
- American Journalists Series
- American Labor: From Conspiracy to Collective Bargaining
- The American Military Experience
- American Negro: His History and Literature (140 vols.). (General editor: William Loren Katz.) Joint publisher: The New York Times.
- American Woman: Images and Realities
- Ancient Economic History
- The Anti-Slavery Crusade in America (70 vols.)
- Architectural Treasures of Early America (Series editors: Russell F. Whitehead and Frank Chouteau Brown)
- Arno Series of Contemporary Art
- Aspects of Film (Advisor editor: Garth S. Jowett)
- Asian Experience in North America Series
- Best Plays Series
- Bestseller Society series
- Big Business: Economic Power in a Free Society
- British Labour Struggles: Contemporary Pamphlets 1727-1850
- The Chicano Heritage Series
- Children and Youth: Social Problems and Social Policy
- Classics in Child Development
- Classics in Psychology Series
- Classics in Psychiatry series
- Committee for Economic Development Research Studies
- The Complete Book of Basketball: A New York Times Scrapbook History Series
- Cookery Americana
- The Development of Public Land Law in the United States
- The Development of Science: Sources for the History of Science
- Dissertations in European Economic History
- Dissertations on Film
- Dissertations on Sociology (Advisory editors: Harriet Zuckerman and Robert K. Merton)
- The Eastern Europe Collection (Advisory editor: Harry Schwartz)
- Essay Index Reprint Series
- European Political Thought series (Advisory editor: J. P. (Jacob Peter) Mayer)
- Eyewitness Accounts of the American Revolution
- Family in America
- The Far Western Frontier
- The First American Frontier Series
- Flight : Its First Seventy-Five Years
- Foreign Travelers in America 1810-1935
- Foundation of Thanatology: Arno Press Continuing Series on Thanatology
- The German Air Force in World War II
- Gold: Historical and Economic Aspects
- Golf Digest Classics
- The Great Contemporary Issues Series
- Greek History Series
- Greek Texts and Commentaries
- Historical Issues in Mental Health
- History of Accounting Series
- History of Broadcasting: Radio to Television
- History of Ecology Series
- History of Geology Series
- History of Ideas in Ancient Greece
- History of Paleontology
- History, Philosophy and Sociology of Science
- Homosexuality: Lesbians and Gay Men in Society, History, and Literature (Series editor: Jonathan Katz)
- International Finance (Advisory editor: Mira Wilkins)
- The Irish-Americans Series
- The Italian American Experience (39 vols.)
- International Labour Office: Studies and Reports
- The Leisure Class in America (Advisory editor: Leon Stein)
- Literature and History of Aviation (Advisory editor: James Gilbert)
- The Literature of Cinema (Advisory editor: Martin S. Dworkin)
- The Literature of Death and Dying
- Literature of Mystery & Detection Series
- The Literature of Photography
- Lost Race and Adult Fantasy Fiction
- Mass Violence in America Series
- Medicine and Society in America Series
- Mental Illness and Social Policy: The American Experience
- Metropolitan America
- The Mexican American
- Mid-American Frontier Collection (Advisory editor: Jerome O. Steffen)
- The Middle East Collection
- Modern Jewish Experience Series
- Morals and Law in Ancient Greece
- Museum of Modern Art Reprints
- National Bureau of Economic Research Publications in Reprint series
- Natural Sciences in America
- Navies and Men
- News in Print Series (Series editors: Mitchell Rapoport and Nancy Volkman)
- The New York Times Film Reviews
- Opera Biographies
- Perspectives in Psychical Research Series
- The Physically Handicapped in Society
- Physician Travelers
- Police in America
- Popular Culture in America, 1800-1925 Series
- Poverty U.S.A.: The Historical Record
- Public Health in America
- Publications of the Continuing Seminar on World Jewry
- Publications of the Institute of the History of Medicine: The Johns Hopkins University
- The Puerto Rican Experience Series
- The Railroads
- Religion in America
- Research Library of Colonial Americana (General editor: Richard C. Robey)
- Right Wing Individualist Tradition in America Series
- Russia Observed
- Science Fiction
- Select Bibliographies Reprint Series
- Selected Works of Anthony Trollope
- Sex, Marriage and Society
- Short Story Index Reprint Series
- Social Problems and Social Policy : The American Experience
- Social Science Studies series
- Sources of Modern Photography Series
- Studies in Roman History
- Supernatural and Occult Fiction
- Tate Gallery Publications
- Technology and Society Series
- The Use & Abuse of America's Natural Resources Series
- United States Air Force Historical Studies
- Utopian Literature Series
- Vietnam Studies
- World Affairs, National and International Viewpoints
- World Food Supply
- Zoological Series

== Selected publications ==
Books

- Belknap, Jeremy. A History of New-Hampshire (1972) ISBN 0405032706 Originally published 1791–92. A title in the Research Library of Colonial Americana series.
- Birnbaum, Norman. Social Structure and the German Reformation (1980) ISBN 0405129459. A title in the Dissertations on Sociology series.
- Board of Governors, Federal Reserve. International Monetary Policies (1979) ISBN 0405112394 Originally published 1947. A title in the International Finance series.
- Crowninshield, Frank. Manners for the Metropolis (1975) ISBN 978-0405069079 A title in The Leisure Class in America series
- Davies, Robert Bruce. Peacefully Working to Conquer the World: Singer Sewing Machines in Foreign Markets, 1854-1920 (1976) Originally presented as author's thesis at University of Wisconsin, 1967. A title in the series American Business Abroad: Origins and Development of the Multinational Corporation.
- Forter, Norman L. The Roumanian Handbook (1971) ISBN 978-0405027475 A title in The Eastern Europe Collection series.
- Guardians of the Poor. A Compilation of the State of Pennsylvania, from the Year 1700 to 1788, Inclusive: The Guardians of the Poor (1971) ISBN 978-0405031069 Originally published 1788. A title in the Poverty U.S.A.: The Historical Record series.
- Hall, Charles E. Negroes in the United States, 1920-1932 (1969), a title in The American Negro: His History and Literature series
- Farmer, John Stephen. Slang and its Analogues (1970) Originally published 1890–1904.
- Kemmerer, Edwin Walter. Gold and the Gold Standard (1979) ISBN 0405112297 Originally published 1944. A title in the International Finance series.
- Wallace, Lewis. Ben Hur, A Tale of the Christ (1977) ISBN 040510653X Originally published 1880.
- Mason, Edward Sagendorph. Controlling World Trade: Cartels and Commodity Agreements (2nd edition, 1972) ISBN 0405045743 Originally published 1946 by the Committee for Economic Development. A title in the World Affairs, National and International Viewpoints series. The first edition Arno Press edition was in its Committee for Economic Development. Research Study series.
- Petrie, W. M. Flinders. Religion and Conscience in Ancient Egypt: Lectures Delivered at University College, London (1980) ISBN 040508854X Originally published 1898.
- Read, James Morgan. Atrocity Propaganda, 1914-1919 (1972) ISBN 978-0405047602 Originally published for the University of Louisville by Yale University Press, 1941.
- Real Estate Record Association. History of Real Estate, Building, and Architecture in New York City During the Last Quarter of a Century (1967)
- Stabler, Elizabeth (ed.). Key Issues: Issues and Events of 1978 from the New York Times Information Bank (1978). A title in the News in Print Series.
- U.S. Congress, Committee on Education. Motion Picture Commission (1978). A title in the Aspects of Film series.
