= Committee on Alleged German Outrages =

World War I commission headed by Viscount Bryce

Report of the Committee on Alleged German Outrages

The Committee on Alleged German Outrages, often called the Bryce Report after its chair, Viscount James Bryce (1838–1922), is best known for producing the "Report of the Committee on Alleged German Outrages," published on 12 May 1915. The report is seen as a major propaganda form that Britain used in order to influence international public opinion regarding the behaviour of Germany, which had invaded Belgium the year before. It was the first significant publication from the War Propaganda Bureau at Wellington House.

The report was translated by the end of 1915 into every major European language and had a profound impact on public opinion in Allied and neutral countries, particularly in the United States. The eyewitness testimony published in its 320-page Appendix A included sensationalist accounts of mutilations and rapes for which there is no other evidence. These invented atrocities tainted the report and have made it an often cited example of propaganda and psychological warfare.

== History ==
By the middle of September 1914, the Belgian government had issued three reports on German war crimes committed during the invasion of the country, and there were calls in the British Parliament and the press for a British commission to conduct its own inquiry. Prime Minister H. H. Asquith responded on 15 September by authorizing the Home Secretary and the Attorney General to investigate allegations of violations of the laws of war by the German Army. In the end, some 1,200 witnesses were interviewed by teams of barristers appointed by George A. Aitken, Assistant Home Secretary, who directed the investigation, and by clerks in the Attorney General's Office. Most of the witnesses were Belgian refugees; nearly two million Belgians had fled the country, and over 120,000 found refuge in the UK.

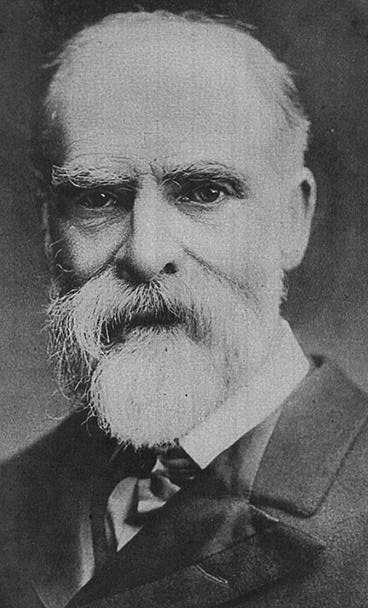
James Bryce, 1st Viscount Bryce

On 4 December James Bryce was asked to chair the "German Outrages Inquiry Committee", which would review the material that had been collected and issue a report. The mission of this committee was to review the "charges that German soldiers, either directed or condoned by their officers, had been guilty of widespread atrocities in Belgium." Bryce asked if he would have a chance to interview witnesses, but was told that would not be necessary. The Britannic Majesty's Government appointed some of their most notable citizens to be a part of the committee: James Bryce who was a British ambassador to the United States, H.A.L Fisher a well-known Liberal historian, Sir Frederick Pollock who was a famous judge and legal historian, and Harold Cox, the Edinburgh Review editor, and two lawyers, Sir Edward Clark and Sir Alfred Hopkinson.

Viscount Bryce was an inspired choice to chair the committee. He was a Gladstonian Liberal who had opposed the Boer War and had sought accommodation with Germany until the invasion of Belgium. He also had a substantial reputation as a scholar, having studied at Heidelberg, had made his scholarly reputation with a book on the Holy Roman Empire, and had been awarded honorary doctorates by the universities of Jena and Leipzig in addition to the Pour le Mérite. Still more important for the government, Bryce was a respected figure in both Britain and the United States, where he had been the British ambassador from 1907 to 1913, and was a friend of President Wilson. He had written an important work on the political system in the U.S., The American Commonwealth, had traveled widely in the country, and had many admirers among American politicians and intellectuals. His imprimatur guaranteed that the report would be widely read. In public statements and private correspondence, Bryce claimed that he hoped to exonerate the German Army from accusations of barbarism. Bryce was also known for his sympathy towards the German people and their culture. By selecting Bryce to be head of the committee, it was believed that the research and findings completed would be reviewed with extreme care and that it would hold the guilty responsible for their actions.

=== Membership ===
The membership of the committee incorporated many important individuals of British and international status, including Sir Frederick Pollock, Sir Edward Clarke, Sir Alfred Hopkinson, Sir Kenelm E. Digby, Mr. H. A. L. Fisher, and Mr. Harold Cox.

=== Conflict within the Committee ===
By the beginning of March 1915, Harold Cox began to have reservations about some of the depositions and about the limited role the committee was playing in the investigation. He wanted the members to re-interview some of the witnesses, and threatened to resign if his request was not met. Bryce agreed to rewrite the report's preface to more clearly explain that the committee was simply evaluating statements submitted by others and he agreed to permit Cox to reject any deposition he found suspect. Cox had written: "...at the very least we ought to take the precaution of examining the barristers and other persons who have taken depositions," and this request Bryce also granted. He convinced Cox, however, that it would not be practical to re-interview witnesses, and the editor and former M.P. remained on the committee.

The committee reportedly examined 1,200 witnesses, 500 of whose statements were incorporated in the report, along with excerpts from 37 personal diaries found on dead German soldiers, some of whom were officers. Many of the accounts in the final report had previously been published in newspaper stories or in official accounts released by the Belgian government, but they were given renewed credibility by the British committee.

Depositions were collected by a team of English barristers, assigned solely for the purpose of collecting witness accounts for the committee. The committee stressed the need for reliable sources, so that its findings would be both credible and truthful. The committee was unwilling to mention atrocity tales in fear of releasing inaccurate and biased stories as fact. As a result, the committee states within the Bryce Report that "many depositions have thus been omitted on which, although they are probably true, we think it safer not to place reliance. By removing the extreme witness accounts from its report, the committee believed it had "eliminated utterly unreliable and unsupported statements." To stress the importance of a truthful report, the committee on Alleged German Outrages used a professional process to investigate the war crimes the German army was accused of. To make sure the report maintained a professional level, the committee wrote its findings in legal terms. Once these depositions were completely analyzed, the original depositions were stored at the British Home Office for protection.

== Findings of the committee ==
The Report of the Committee on Alleged German Outrages, more commonly known as the Bryce Report, was a 61-page document issued on 12 May 1915.

=== The report ===
The British Home Office collected a vast amount of "evidence" from civilians whose villages were attacked by German troops, British officers, German soldier diaries, and other firsthand accounts. The evidence against the German soldiers verified their inhumane acts of violence.

The report was divided into two parts:

- Part I, "The Conduct of the German Troops in Belgium" consists of descriptions and summaries of war crimes in six regions: "Liège and District," "Valleys of Meuse and Sambre," "The Aerschot (Aarschot), Malines (Mechelen), Vilvorde (Vilvoorde), and Louvain (Leuven) Quadrangle," "Louvain (Leuven) and District," "Termonde" (Dendermonde), and "Alost" (Aalst).

Belgium was guaranteed by a Treaty in 1839, that no nation was to have the right to claim the passage for its army through a neutral state. The treaty was in the case that Germany and France might enter a war between each other.

The Belgian Minister in 1911 requested from Germany that she would respect the Treaty of 1839. Germany's response to the request was, "Belgian neutrality is provided for by international conventions and Germany is determined to respect those conventions."

The German minister, Herr von Below, on 2 August 1914 presented Belgium with a note where they demanded with an instant declaration of war that they were allowed passage through Belgium.

The king of Belgium with concern for his civilians was reluctant to agree to Germany's request. But on the evening of 3 August, German troops crossed through Belgium territory. Belgian civilians were startled by the attacks, and German troops did not expect a difficult passage.

- Part II is divided into two sections summarizing "Treatment of Civilian Population" and "Offences Against Combatants."

After having "narrated the offenses committed in Belgium, which it has been proper to consider as a whole, we now turn to another branch of the subject, the breaches of the usages of war which appear in the conduct of the German army general."

A one-page Conclusion follows.

The Report came to four conclusions about the behavior of the German Army:

- "That there were in many parts of Belgium deliberate and systematically organized massacres of the civil population, accompanied by many isolated murders and other outrages."
- “That in the conduct of the war generally innocent civilians, both men and women, were murdered in large numbers, women violated, and children murdered."
- “That looting, house burning, and the wanton destruction of property were ordered and countenanced by the officers of the German Army, that elaborate provisions had been made for systematic incendiarism at the very outbreak of the war, and that the burnings and destruction were frequent where no military necessity could be alleged, being indeed part of a system of general terrorism.”
- “That the rules and usages in of war were frequently broken, particularly by the using of civilians, including woman and children, as a shield for advancing forces exposed to the fire, to a lesser degree by killing the wounded and prisoners, and in the frequent abuse of the Red Cross and the White Flag."

The committee determined that "these excesses were committed – in some cases ordered, in others allowed – on a system and in pursuance of a set purpose. That purpose was to strike terror into the civil population and dishearten the Belgian troops, so as to crush down resistance and extinguish the very spirit of self-defence. The pretext that civilians had fired upon the invading troops was used to justify not merely the shooting of individual francs-tireurs, but the murder of large numbers of innocent civilians, an act absolutely forbidden by the rules of civilised warfare."

The committee sought to exonerate certain individuals. German peasants "are as kindly and good-natured as any people in Europe. But for Prussian officers, war seems to have become a sort of sacred mission... The Spirit of War is deified. Obedience to the State and its War Lord leaves no room for any other duty or feeling. Cruelty becomes legitimate when it promises victory."

The committee made an important note that this report was investigating the actions of the German army and that the German people should not be blamed for the crimes of their national army. This careful investigation of all 1,200 depositions created the belief that the term ‘atrocity’ should be directly connected with the German army, due to the army's extreme practice of militarism. This is confirmed by the German diaries, which showed the German account of the war crimes in Belgium was directly ordered by commanding army officers. In its final conclusion, the committee claimed that the militarism of the German army was the cause of the outrages in Belgium.

=== Distribution ===
The Report was widely accepted throughout the world, translated into more than 30 languages and widely circulated by British propaganda services, especially in the US, where it was reprinted and circulated in most of the US national newspapers, including The New York Times.

== Impact of Report ==
On 27 May 1915 it was reported that every New York newspaper had reprinted the Bryce Report. Charles Masterman, head of the British War Propaganda Bureau at Wellington House, had 41,000 copies shipped to the US. The same month the German government attempted to combat the report with the publication of its own reports on atrocities committed against German soldiers by Belgian civilians. It offered depositions and eyewitness accounts but had little impact.

The Committee on Public Information urged US newspapers not to publish stories that might undermine the Bryce Report. A column titled "The Daily German Lie" linked support for the report's authenticity to a War Department request for a ban on printing unsubstantiated atrocity stories.

The findings of the committee became a major piece of British propaganda used to convince Americans to join the war. The committee's report proved the atrocities in Belgium were committed under German militarism, which left neutral countries to draw their own conclusions of how to view the German army. But, based on their own conclusions, most neutral countries, especially the United States, came to connect the German army with the term ‘atrocity’ during World War I. "By identifying German army conduct with militarism, the Bryce Report made opposition to the German army the same as opposition to war itself." Because the Bryce Report was considered a credible source, it was cited throughout national newspapers. The New York Times reported that the committee was "set to answer the question, ‘Were there German atrocities in Belgium?’ and they have answered it. They have made further disputes impossible." The American public believed that the committee had made credible arguments against the German army.

=== Criticism ===
German authorities in response to allegations from multiple sources published the White Book in 1915. The book contained records where Belgians were guilty of atrocities committed on German soldiers.

- “It has been established beyond doubt that Belgian civilians plundered, killed and even shockingly mutilated German wounded soldiers in which atrocities even women and children took part. Thus the eyes were gouged out of the German wounded soldiers, their ears, noses and finger-joints were cut off, or they were emasculated or disemboweled. In other cases German soldiers were poisoned or strung up on trees; hot liquid was poured over them, or they were otherwise burned so that they died under terrible tortures."

Immediately after World War I, the original documents of the Belgian witness depositions could not be found in the British Home Office, where they were supposed to be kept for protection. This prevented others from questioning and investigating the depositions to test whether the Bryce Report was true. The Committee on Alleged German Outrages had no direct part in collecting the depositions of the witnesses. The majority of the depositions that were obtained for the Bryce Report were taken by English barristers (lawyers), who were not under oath. The committee did not personally interview a single witness, openly and clearly stating in its preamble that it relied instead on depositions given without oaths and hearsay evidence which it considered to be independently corroborated.

Objections were made to the timing of its release, to the fact that the testimony of witnesses was not given under oath and the individuals were not identified by name, and to the improbability of some of the testimony. It was repeatedly claimed that the charges had been refuted by subsequent investigations. The fact that the original depositions were lost was said to show bad faith. The motives of Bryce and the other members were also questioned. Trevor Wilson claims in particular that members believed that if they rejected the more sensationalist accusations against the German Army, involving rape and mutilation, audiences would question the more prosaic war crimes that the Army did indeed commit.

Among the books of the interwar period attacking the Bryce Report are Harold Lasswell, Propaganda Techniques in the World War (1927), C. Hartley Grattan, Why We Fought (1928), Harry Elmer Barnes, In Quest of Truth and Justice (1928), George Viereck, Spreading Germs of Hate (1930), James Squires, British Propaganda at Home and in the United States (1935), H. C. Peterson, Propaganda for War: The Campaign Against American Neutrality, 1914-1917 (1938) and James Morgan Read, Atrocity Propaganda, 1914-1919 (1941).

=== Responses to criticism ===
As to the specific charges made by inter-war revisionists, there is no evidence that the report was rushed into print five days after the sinking of the Lusitania in order to capitalize on the outrage caused by that event. When there can be no prosecution for perjury, the taking of testimony under oath is no guarantee of its reliability, as evidenced by the German White Book (which claimed the Belgian government had organized guerrilla attacks on the German Army in 1914), where most of the depositions are sworn. The Belgian government requested that witnesses not be identified by name for fear of reprisals against relatives and friends in occupied Belgium. Most witnesses can be identified from lists of names in the committee's papers in the National Archives.

When historian James Morgan Read wished to consult the original depositions in 1939, he was told, with much embarrassment, that they were lost. On 13 August 1942, however, the missing depositions were located. The depositions, however, were subsequently destroyed, most likely by a German rocket. There is no evidence that they were deliberately withheld from Read or intentionally destroyed.

However, the claim by revisionists that some of the testimony is not credible is entirely legitimate. The committee included in Appendix A depositions it should have been much more skeptical of, particularly from Belgian soldiers. Critics repeatedly cited as the most egregious accusations a claim by a Belgian soldier that he had witnessed a mass rape in central Liège and the claim of two civilians in Mechelen that they saw a German soldier spear a child with his bayonet as he marched past.

There is a clear correlation between the unreliability of the testimony in a given town or region and the percentage of soldiers offering testimony. In an analysis of the plausibility of testimony in Appendix A, based on other sources, Jeff Lipkes found that in the testimony about Liège and the villages to its east, the 35 depositions average 3.8 on a scale of 1 to 5, where 1 represents "probably a legend or invention" and 5 represents “very likely". Soldiers, however, rate only 2.16, while civilians average 4.14. The former accounted for just 17% of the depositions. Similarly, in the section on the valleys of the Meuse and Sambre, the 30 statements by witnesses average 3.77, with civilians rating 4.04, while soldiers only average 2.4. The soldiers again comprised a low percent of the total, 16.6%. It is in the region designated “The Aershot, Malines, Vilvorde, Louvain Quadrangle,” where the majority of the testimony comes from soldiers, that the most dubious depositions occur. Even within this region, testimony from townspeople tends to be reliable. In Aarschot, the 38 depositions average 4.0. Soldiers, 31.6% of the total, averaged only 2.4, whereas the 26 civilians rated 4.73, providing credible accounts that fully tallied with other evidence.

Although the claim was made repeatedly that subsequent investigations disproved the charges of the Bryce Report, this is not the case. There was no systematic attempt to analyze the findings of the committee, and certainly no official re-investigation. Read, the most scholarly of the revisionists, compared eyewitness reports in three towns with the reports of the post-war Belgian Commission of Inquest. In Mechelen and Elewijt, there are certainly some dubious allegations among the Bryce Committee witnesses. However, the 14 reports from Aalst are almost entirely corroborated by testimony from the Belgian Commission. Most of the slashings, stabbings, and burnings described by witnesses were likely to have taken place.

In areas where there were mass executions, the Bryce Report actually underestimates the killing. In Aarschot, where 169 civilians were murdered, the report records only ten deaths. No totals are given for Dinant, where 674 civilians were killed; however, various figures, added together, come to 410. As for Tamines, where 383 were killed, the report only states: “A witness describes how he saw the public square littered with corpses...” The committee had few witnesses to draw upon for the French-speaking regions of Belgium. Most Walloons fled to France.

There is no evidence that committee members felt that the graver charges would not be believed in if the more sensationalist accusations were dismissed, as Wilson claims. However, there is no question that the committee members exercised poor judgement in their selection of some testimony. They reprinted 55 depositions from the small town of Hofstadt, many dubious, where fewer than ten murders occurred. (The depositions average only 2.11 on Lipkes's scale, with soldiers providing 85% of the testimony.) Meanwhile, the committee failed to investigate carefully well-documented cases of mass executions, such as Andenne, Tamines, and Dinant.

== Conclusion ==
Today, many writers contend that the Bryce report was a "morally questionable" piece of wartime propaganda. However, historians focusing on the actions of the German army in Belgium have found Bryce's work to be "substantially accurate". Lipkes writes the committee's report should no longer considered a "prime example of untruthful war propaganda".

Bennett writes that Bryce's Committee had an honest intent to find the truth, and its major allegations were supported by historical evidence. However its methodological flaws, inclusion of some lurid anecdotes, and association with the Allied war effort made it vulnerable to attack by postwar revisionists and pro-German propagandists.

== See also ==
- Archibald Reiss
- Rape of Belgium
