= Austine =

Austine is a surname and a given name. Notable people with the name include:

Given name:

- Austine Wood Comarow (1942–2020), American artist, invented Polage art
- Austine Igbinosa (born 1980), professional footballer
- Henry Austine Ugochukwu (born 1992), Nigerian professional football player
- Laurence Austine Waddell (1854–1938), Scottish explorer, Professor of Tibetan, etc.

Surname:

- Chukwukere Austine, Nigerian politician

== See also ==
- Austine School, former school for deaf children age 4–18 from New England and New York
- Austin (disambiguation)
