= Austine Wood Comarow =

American artist (1942–2020)

- Born: Austine Barton Read; November 10, 1942; Louisville, Kentucky
- Died: July 31, 2020; Las Vegas, Nevada
- Education: International School of Geneva; Swarthmore College; Indiana University Bloomington, BA; Pontifical Catholic University of Chile; Syracuse University
- Known for: Artist and inventor of Polage art
- Notable work: "Human Connections" permanent installation at the Museum of Science (Boston), Red Wing "Rose Windows" in the Sleeping Beauty Castle, Le Château de la Belle au Bois Dormant at Eurodisney Chessy, France
- Movement: Light Art
- Spouses: H. John Wood, III (m. 1961; div. 1974) David Comarow (m. 1976)
- Children: Cara Ginder and Erika Wood
- Parents: James Morgan Read (father); Henrietta Barton Morton (mother)

Austine Wood Comarow (November 10, 1942 – July 31, 2020) was an American artist known for inventing Polage art, an art medium using color created out of polarized white light and clear cellulose.

== Early life ==
Austine was born in Louisville, Kentucky, daughter of diplomat James Morgan Read and artist Henrietta Morton Read. She lived in Germany when her father was Chief of the Division of Education and Cultural Relations of the Allied High Commission for Occupied Germany, (HICOG). The family moved to Geneva, Switzerland in 1951, when her father became Deputy High Commissioner for Refugees at the United Nations. In 1960, Austine returned to the United States to attend Swarthmore College, completing her Bachelor of Fine Arts degree in Russian Language and Literature at Indiana University Bloomington in 1964. She studied art at Pontifical Catholic University of Chile in Santiago from 1970 to 1973 and later earned her Master of Fine Arts degree at Syracuse University in 1981.

== Career ==
In 1967, Austine began developing a new light art medium she named Polage art using polarizing filter and a collaging method of building images from cut pieces of clear cellulose. The medium produces brightly colored images without the use of pigments or dyes of any kind, and when manipulating materials in the viewers’ hands or within the workings of the art itself, the colors shift and morph the visible images.

Her work is included in the permanent collections at the Museum of Science Boston, the New Mexico Museum of Natural History and Science, and Swarthmore College, along with hospitals, museums, public spaces and private collections the world over.

In 1998, Austine began a long relationship with Maui Jim, which specializes in high-quality polarized sunglasses.
