= Blegny =

Municipality in Liège Province, Wallonia, Belgium

Blegny Blegné (Walloon)
- Municipality
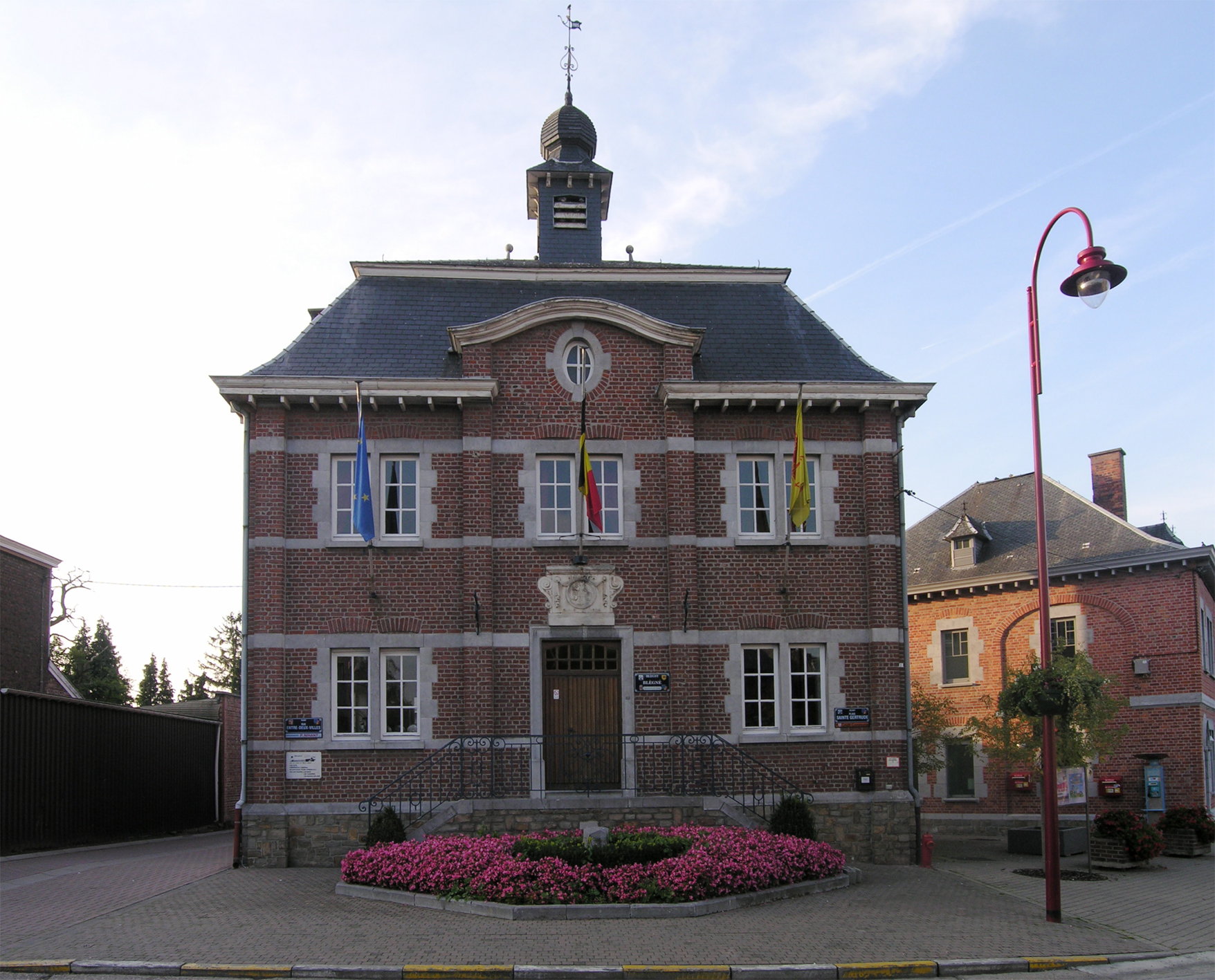
- Town Hall Blegny

- Coat of arms

- Location of Blegny in Liège province
- Interactive map of Blegny
- Location in Belgium
- Coordinates: 50°40′N 5°44′E
- Country: Belgium
- Community: French Community
- Region: Wallonia
- Province: Liège
- Arrondissement: Liège

Government
  - Mayor: Arnaud Garsou
  - Governing party: PS

Area
  - Total: 26.08 km^{2} (10.07 sq mi)

Population (2017-01-01)
  - Total: 13,212
  - Density: 506.6/km^{2} (1,312/sq mi)
- Postal codes: 4670-4672
- NIS code: 62119
- Area codes: 04
- Website: www.blegny.be

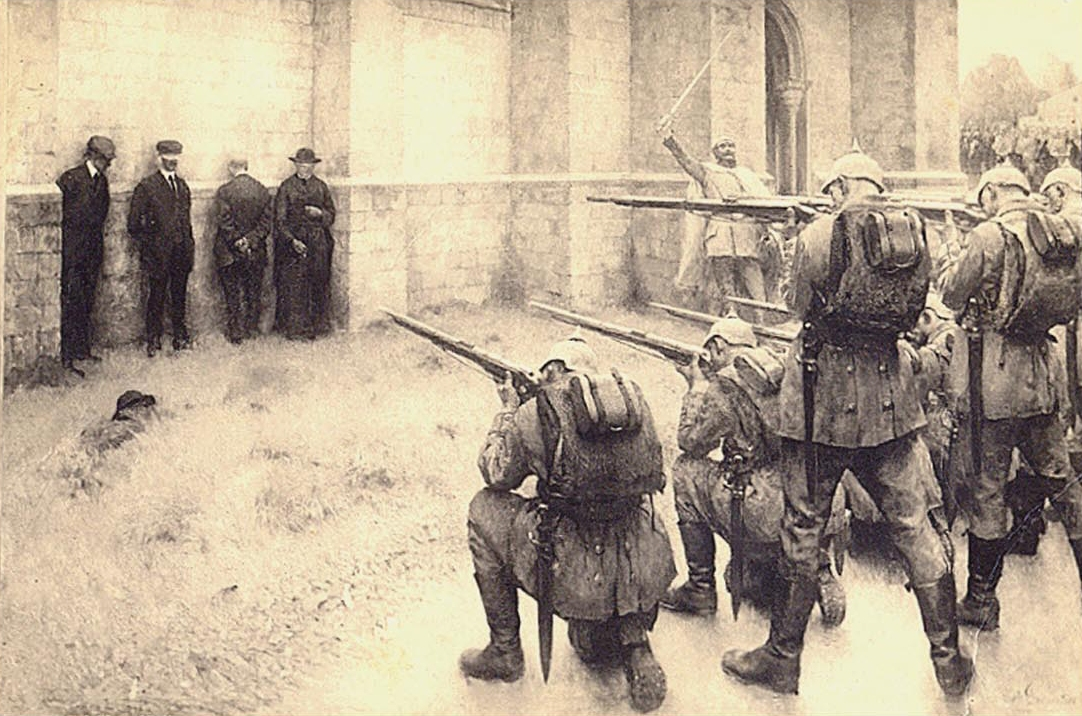
Évariste Carpentier's depiction of the execution of civilians in Blégny in 1914, during the early months of the WWI German occupation of Belgium.

Blegny (French pronunciation: [bleɲi], before 2001: Blégny; Walloon: Blegné) is a municipality of Wallonia located in the Province of Liège, Belgium.

On January 1, 2006, Blegny had a total population of 12,799. The total area is 26.07 km^{2} which gives a population density of 491 inhabitants per km^{2}.

The municipality consists of the following districts: Barchon, Housse, Mortier, Saint-Remy, Saive, and Trembleur (town centre).

== See also ==
- List of protected heritage sites in Blegny
