= William Loren Katz =

American teacher, historian and author (1927–2019)

- Born: 2 June 1927; New York City, United States
- Died: October 25, 2019 (aged 92)
- Occupation: Teacher, historian, author

William Loren Katz (June 2, 1927 – October 25, 2019) was an American teacher, historian and author of 40 books on African-American history, including a number of titles for young adult readers. He was particularly noted for his research and writing on the 500-year history of relations between African Americans and Native Americans. His books include Breaking the Chains: African American Slave Resistance, The Black West, and Black Women of the Old West.

== Biography ==
Born in New York City, Katz was the son of Ben (a researcher) and Madeline (née Simon) Katz. After graduating high school in 1944, Katz joined the Navy at the age of 17 and later used the GI Bill to attend college. A graduate of Syracuse University (Bachelor of Arts in history, 1950) and of New York University (Master of Arts in Secondary Education, 1952), Katz taught in New York City and state public secondary education systems for 14 years. He served as a consultant to the U.S. Senate, the British House of Commons, and the Smithsonian Institution; the state boards of education of North Carolina and New York; and school districts from California to Florida and England. He was married to Laurie Lehman, an associate professor of special education at Long Island University's Brooklyn Campus, who was an early authority and writer on disability studies. He was the father of two children.

Katz's "Education and Books" column appeared in the New York Daily Challenge; contributed articles to the Amsterdam News and many other publications; he hosted an interview program on Pacifica Radio station WBAI-FM in New York, and appeared on many TV and radio programs hosted by Indigenous Americans and African Americans. He was the recipient of the 2000 White Dove Imani Peace Award from the White Dove-Imani-Rainbow Lodge of Whitehall, Ohio.

Katz spoke at more than 50 universities and dozens of museums, and libraries, including The American Museum of Natural History, the Smithsonian Institution, the Western History Association to Johns Hopkins University, The Institute for Texan Cultures, and the Schomburg Library. He became affiliated with New York University in 1973, and edited more than 220 research volumes for libraries. He edited the American Negro: His History and Literature book series for Arno Press.

His books, research, writing and lectures won several awards, including the 1991 Carter G. Woodson Book Award for Breaking the Chains. John Hope Franklin, Henry Louis Gates Jr., John Henrik Clarke, Howard Zinn, James M. McPherson, Alice Walker, Cornel West, Ivan Van Sertima, Betty Shabazz, and Dr. Ralph Bunche have praised his works.

== Career ==
- New York City public schools, New York, NY: teacher of American history, 1955–60
- Greenburgh District 8 School System, Hartsdale, NY: high school teacher of American history, 1960–68
- New School for Social Research (now New School University), New York, NY: instructor in U.S. history, beginning 1977
- Columbia University: Scholar-in-residence and research fellow, 1971–73
- Lecturer on American Negro history at teacher institutes
- Toombs Prison: teacher of Black history
- Testified before U.S. Senate on Negro history
- Appearances on television and radio programs, including the Today Show
- Consultant to President Kennedy's Committee on Juvenile Delinquency and Youth Development, Smithsonian Institution; U.S. Air Force schools in England, Belgium, and Holland, 1974–75; Inner London Educational Authority, 1982; British House of Commons; Life magazine; The New York Times; Columbia Broadcasting System (CBS-TV).

In 2012, he received the National Underground Railroad to Freedom Award by the National Park Service and delivered the keynote address "The Underground Railroad that Ran South to Freedom" at its National Conference. He received an award for lifetime contributions to the literature for children of African descent from the Institute of African American Affairs of New York University, where he had been a scholar-in-residence.

== Selected bibliography ==
- Eyewitness: A Living Documentary of the African American Contribution to American History (1995, Touchstone), ISBN 0-684-80199-X
- Black Women of the Old West (1995, Atheneum), ISBN 0-689-31944-4
- The Black West: A Documentary and Pictorial History of the African American Role in the Westward Expansion of the United States (1996, Touchstone), ISBN 0-684-81478-1
- Black Indians: A Hidden Heritage (1997, Simon Pulse), ISBN 0-689-80901-8
- Black Legacy: A History of New York's African Americans (1997, Atheneum), ISBN 0-689-31913-4
- Breaking The Chains (1998, Simon Pulse), ISBN 0-689-81919-6
- Black Pioneers: An Untold Story (1999, Atheneum), ISBN 0-689-81410-0
- The Cruel Years: American Voices at the Dawn of the Twentieth Century (with Laurie Lehman, 2001, Beacon Press), ISBN 1-891843-06-0

=== Essays by Katz ===
- Justice and African Seminoles, March 15, 2001
- Iraq, the US and an Old Lesson Wednesday April 28, 2004
- We Are Repeating the Mistake We Made in the Philippines 100 Years Ago, May 3, 2004
- The Meaning of Hugo Chávez Tuesday, August 24, 2004
- What Goes Around Comes Around Tuesday October 19, 2004
- The Forgotten Fight Against Fascism, June 13, 2014, on Common Dreams
- "The Birth of a Nation: A Century Later", February 14, 2015, on Common Dreams

== See also ==
- Black Indians in the United States
- Black Seminoles
- Native Americans in the United States
- Native American tribes
- One-Drop Rule
- Zambo
