= List of protected heritage sites in Blegny =

This table shows an overview of the protected heritage sites in the Walloon town Blegny. This list is part of Belgium's national heritage.

Object	Year/architect	Town/section	Address	Coordinates	Number^{?}	Image
Cortils Castle ^{(nl)} ^{(fr)}		Blégny		50.695822°N 5.743459°E	62119-CLT-0001-01 Info	Kasteel van Cortils, gevels en daken, en het ensemble van het kasteel en het omliggende terrein, te Mortier
Castle Saive ruins ^{(nl)} ^{(fr)}		Blégny		50.659667°N 5.683156°E	62119-CLT-0002-01 Info	Ruïnes van kasteel Saive en het ensemble van deze ruïnes het het omliggende terrein
Castle Méan ^{(nl)} ^{(fr)}		Blégny	rue Cahorday, n°3	50.651602°N 5.676987°E	62119-CLT-0003-01 Info	Kasteel Méan: gevels, daken, balzaal op de tweede verdieping
Old house ^{(nl)} ^{(fr)}		Blégny	rue Cohy, n°9	50.658369°N 5.677864°E	62119-CLT-0004-01 Info	
Church of St. Pierre ^{(nl)} ^{(fr)}		Blégny		50.652993°N 5.682199°E	62119-CLT-0005-01 Info	Kerk ('Saint-Pierre') en het ensemble van de kerk met zijn omgeving
Chapel of Saint-Gilles de Richelette ^{(nl)} ^{(fr)}		Blégny	Chemin du Gué	50.687120°N 5.731296°E	62119-CLT-0007-01 Info	Ensemble van de kapel Saint-Gilles de Richelette aan de Chemin du Gué en diens omgeving, te Mortier
Pixho farmhouse ^{(nl)} ^{(fr)}		Blégny	Allée des Marronniers 2	50.645272°N 5.680479°E	62119-CLT-0009-01 Info	
Parts of castle farm ^{(nl)} ^{(fr)}		Blégny	rue Wérihet 7, Housse	50.681434°N 5.692803°E	62119-CLT-0010-01 Info	Bepaalde delen van de kasteelhoeve
Farmhouse ^{(nl)} ^{(fr)}		Blégny	rue des Châteaux 24	50.651061°N 5.680156°E	62119-CLT-0011-01 Info	

== See also ==
- List of protected heritage sites in Liège (province)
