= Housse =

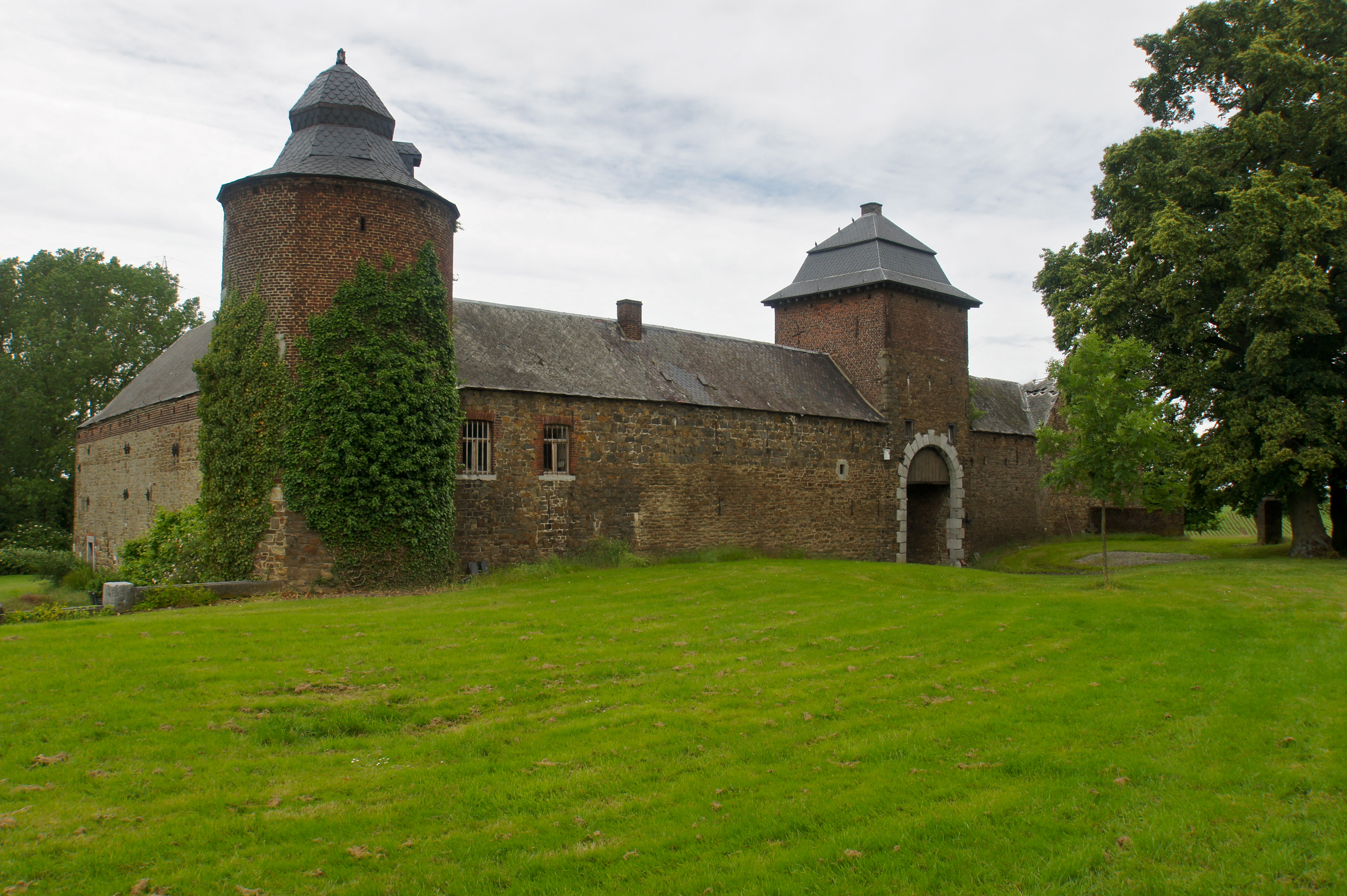
- Housse, Ferme-château de Housse

- Location within Belgium Location within Europe
- Coordinates: 50°40′45″N 05°41′35″E
- Country: Belgium
- Region: Wallonia
- Province: Liège
- Municipality: Blegny

Housse is a district of the municipality of Blegny, located in the Liège Province in Wallonia, Belgium.

During the Middle Ages, much of the village belonged to the Val-Dieu Abbey. The historical centre of the village contain some historical buildings, including a fortified estate, the Ferme-château de Housse. The village church was destroyed in 1940, during World War II, and a Neo-Romanesque church built after the war.
