= Mira Wilkins =

American historian

Mira Wilkins (born 1 June 1931) is an American economic and business historian and a world authority on the history of American business and foreign direct investment. She is Professor Emerita at the Department of Economics, Florida International University.

Wilkins received a Bachelor of Arts degree from Radcliffe College and a PhD from the University of Cambridge in 1957. She has been a pioneer in the field of business history, especially in the field of foreign direct investment, foreign portfolio investment and multinational enterprises on which she published two books The History of Foreign Investment in the United States to 1914 and its sequel The History of Foreign Investment in the United States, 1914-1945. She has been called the "doyen of historians of international business," and has published numerous major studies in this field. Her most recent book is a study of the role of multinationals in global electrification authored together with Peter Hertner and William Hausmann and titled Global Electrification: Multinational Enterprise and International Finance in the History of Light and Power, 1878–2007. She is a past president of the Business History Conference, which awarded her its Lifetime Achievement Award in 2004.
