= C. Hartley Grattan =

American economist

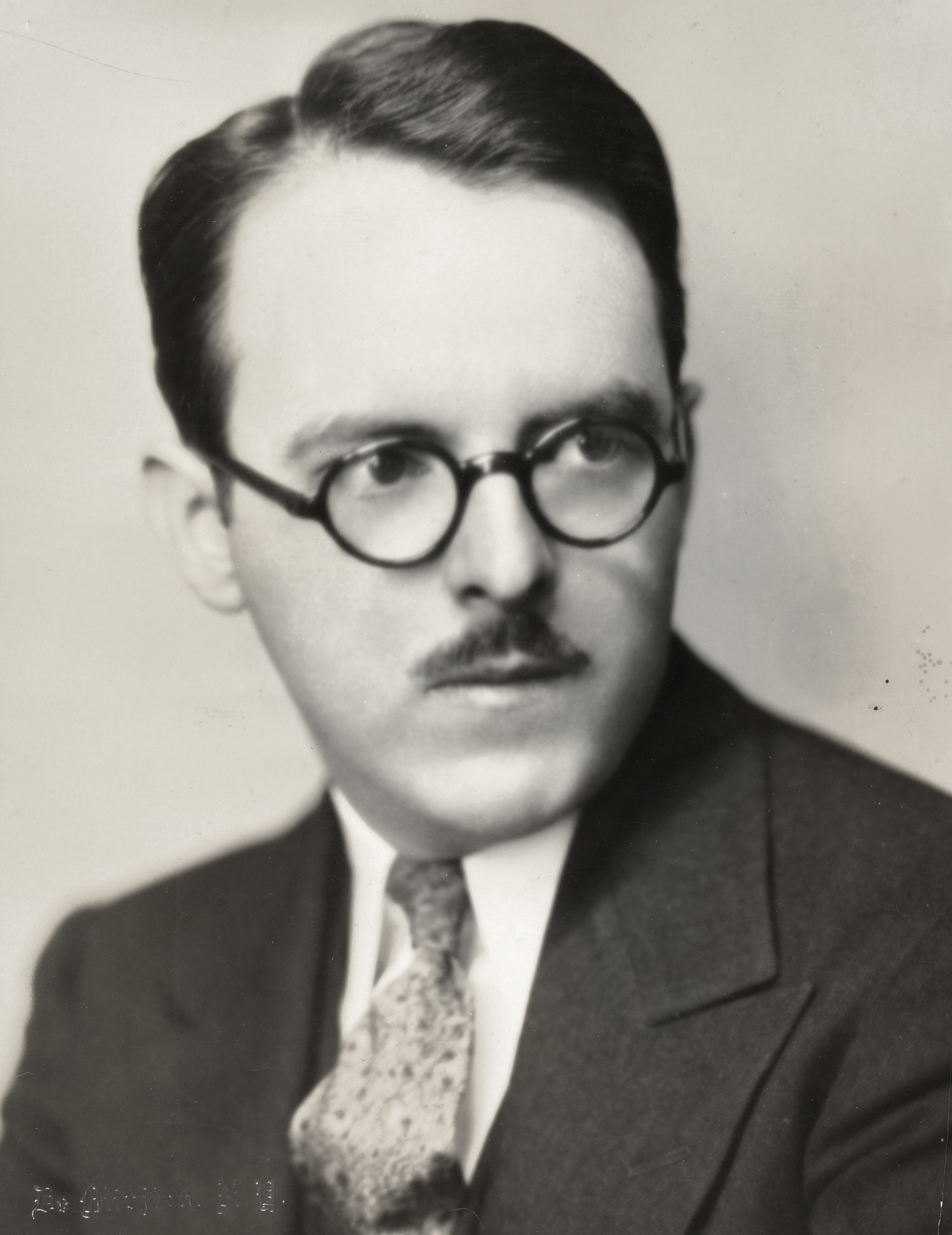
- C. Hartley Grattan, N.Y.
- Born: October 19, 1902; Wakefield, Massachusetts
- Died: June 25, 1980 (aged 77)
- Occupations: Economic analyst, historian, critic, professor emeritus
- Known for: 20th-century Australian history expert

Clinton Hartley Grattan (October 19, 1902 – June 25, 1980) was an American economic analyst, historian, critic, and professor emeritus, who was considered one of the leading American authorities on 20th-century Australian history.

== Career ==
Born in Wakefield, Massachusetts, in 1902, Grattan received his Bachelor of Arts degree from Clark University (Worcester, MA) in 1923. In 1937, Grattan traveled to Australia as a Carnegie traveling scholar where he remained for two years. While studying and presenting there he provoked the ire of the Ministry for Agriculture when he stated that Australian farmers were ill-prepared to weather sudden economic downturns. This would not be Grattan's only brush with controversy. In 1942, Grattan was forced to resign as economic analyst to the American Board of Economic Warfare when Representatives Martin Dies Jr. and Jerry Voorhis accused him of being both a Nazi and communist sympathizer; allegations that were withdrawn by Voorhis a short time later. Grattan began teaching at the University of Texas at Austin in 1964. It is the Austin campus which houses the Grattan Collection of Southwest Pacifica, considered the most complete collection of such items in the United States containing artifacts from Australia as well as New Zealand, Antarctica, and the Pacific Islands.

In addition to his work as an analyst and historian, Grattan was also a freelance writer who published articles and critiques in such magazines as The American Mercury, Harper's and Scribner's. He was awarded an honorary Doctor of Laws degree from the Australian National University in 1977.

== Personal life ==
Grattan was married and had four children.

== Bibliography ==
=== Books ===
- Why We Fought (1929)
- Bitter Bierce: A Mystery of American Letters (1929)
- The Critique of Humanism (1930)
- The Three Jameses (1932)
- The Deadly Parallel (1939)
- The United States and the Southwest Pacific (1961)

=== Book reviews ===
Date	Review article	Work(s) reviewed
1967	Grattan, C. Hartley (December 1967). "[Book review]". Journal of the Royal Australian Historical Society. 53 (4): 353–355.	Clark, C. M. H.; Shaw, A. G. L., eds. (1967). Australian Dictionary of Biography, Vol. 2: 1788-1850, I-Z. Melbourne: Melbourne University Press.
