= Leon Stein (writer and editor) =

Leon Stein (1912 in Baltimore, Maryland – February 13, 1990 in Delray Beach, Florida) was an American writer and longtime editor of Justice, the official newspaper of the International Ladies' Garment Workers' Union (ILGWU).

== Biography ==
Born in Baltimore, Leon Stein moved from New York City as a child and made his home there. By the time he graduated from the City College of New York in 1934, he had worked in a laundry, for the subway, as a waiter in a Catskill resort and as a ladies' garment cutter, and after his graduation he returned to the garment industry as a cutter and patternmaker.

In 1939, Stein began writing a regular feature for Justice, the publication of the ILGWU, and soon was made copy editor and, later, assistant editor of the magazine; in 1952, after Max Danish retired as editor, Stein assumed responsibilities as editor, which he maintained until 1977.

Under Stein's editorship, Justice received many honors, including, in 1959, the distinction of being chosen by the University of California School of Journalism as the outstanding trade union publication in the country. He coedited, with Max Danish, a documentary history of the International Ladies' Garment Workers' Union and helped edit an anthology of writing from the labor press.
