= Ellsworth Young =

American painter and illustrator (1866–1952)

- Born: July 6, 1866; Albia, Iowa, U.S.
- Died: September 26, 1952 (aged 86); Evanston, Illinois, U.S.
- Education: Art Institute of Chicago
- Occupations: Painter and illustrator
- Parent(s): Josiah T. Young and Christiana Burns Potts
- Relatives: Lafayette Young (uncle)

Ellsworth Young (6 July 1866 Albia, Iowa – 26 September 1952 Evanston, Illinois) was an American magazine and book illustrator, and a noted painter of landscapes. He worked for the Works Progress Administration (WPA) Collection of the Illinois State Museum, and was employed by the Denver Times and the Chicago Tribune as an editorial illustrator. Young studied at The Art Institute of Chicago with Oliver Dennett Grover and John Vanderpoel.

== Career ==
Young, an Illinois artist, was a member of the Chicago Painters and Sculptors and the Oak Park River Forest Art League. He painted several posters for the war effort of World War I, his best-known probably being "Remember Belgium". The Allied Nations made use of images of supposed German atrocities to bolster their propaganda machine.

In 2010, Western Illinois University began looking at stored works of art to refurbish, and discovered a rolled-up painting that held "tremendous historical significance". It was a painting by Young of a river landscape in autumn, and had been commissioned in 1934 to hang in Monroe Hall (later known as Grote Hall) and remaining there for some 60 years until the Hall was demolished in 1991. The painting was sent to the Chicago Conservation Center to be restored.

== Family ==
Ellsworth Young was born in Albia, Iowa, to Josiah Titus Young (1831–1907), an American politician, lawyer, and newspaper editor, and Christiana Burns Potts (maiden; 1831–1898). He was also a nephew of Lafayette Young (1848–1926), Senator from Iowa.

== Gallery ==
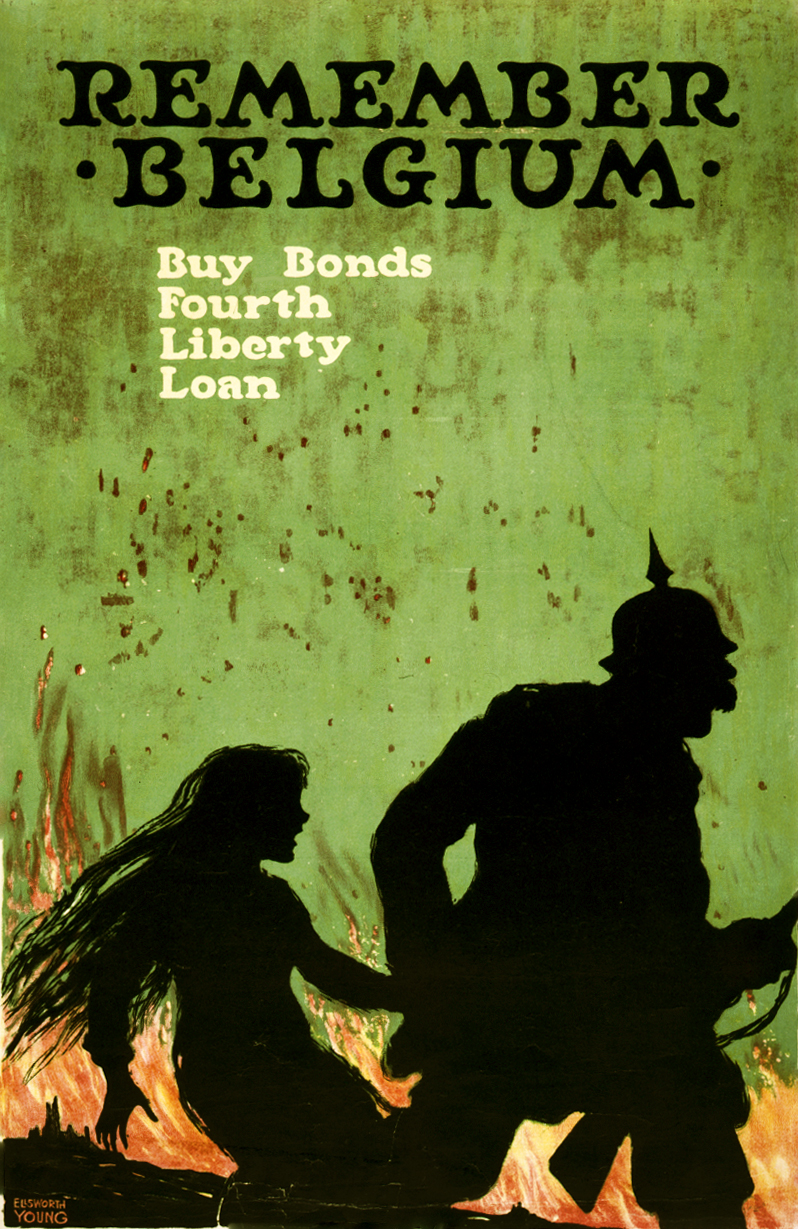
Remember Belgium, buy Bonds fourth liberty loan

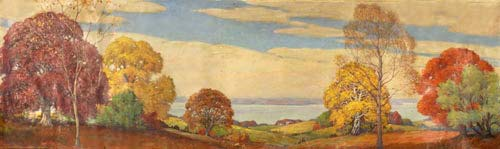
Displayed at Western Illinois University

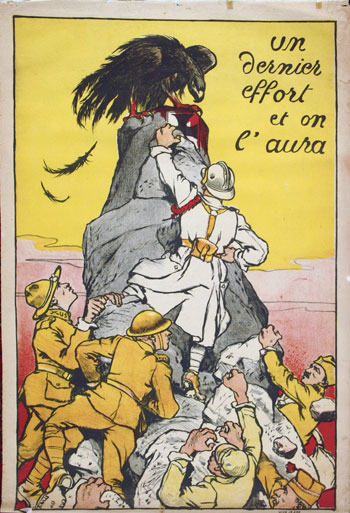
World War I poster

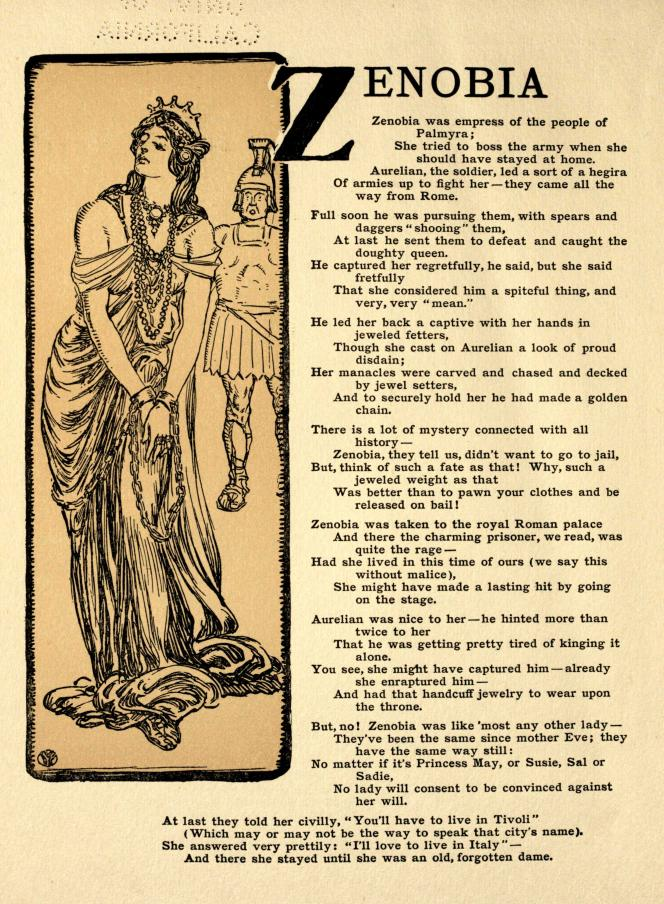
Zenobia

== Bibliography ==
=== References ===
- Falk, Peter Hastings, ed. (1999). Who Was Who in American Art – 400 Years of Artists in America (3 Vols.) (2nd ed.). Madison, Connecticut: Sound View Press. LCCN 2001-271878; ISBN 978-0-9320-8755-3, 0-9320-8755-8; OCLC 42517882 (all editions).
1. Vol. 3: "P–Z" → "Young, Ellsworth" – via Internet Archive (Kahle/Austin Foundation; Burlingame Public Library, withdrawn).
