= Harry Schwartz (journalist) =

New York Times journalist (1919 – 2004)

- Born: September 10, 1919; New York City, New York, U.S.
- Died: November 10, 2004 (aged 85); New Rochelle, New York, U.S.
- Education: Columbia University (BA, MA, PhD)
- Occupations: Journalist; professor
- Employer: The New York Times

Harry Schwartz (September 10, 1919 – November 10, 2004) was an editorial writer for The New York Times from 1951 to 1979 and a specialist in Soviet and East European affairs.

== Biography ==
Schwartz was born in New York City on September 10, 1919, and was the valedictorian of his graduating class at Columbia College in 1940. He received his master's and doctorate from Columbia in 1941 and 1944, respectively.

In 1942, Schwartz joined the War Production Board and the United States Department of Agriculture as an economist. He was drafted into the army in 1943 but was transferred to the Office of Strategic Services and sent to Europe as a specialist in Soviet economic affairs before being discharged as first lieutenant in 1945.

He joined Syracuse University in 1946 as a professor of economics and joined the staff of The New York Times in 1951 as a full-time editorial writer. He was also a visiting professor at Columbia University College of Physicians & Surgeons and a Distinguished Professor of the State University of New York at New Paltz.

Schwartz was the author of 22 books and thousands of articles, and widely lectured on Soviet economic policies, before switching his focus to healthcare economics.

Schwartz died on November 10, 2004, at his home in New Rochelle, New York at age 85.
