= Austine Igbinosa =

Togolese footballer (born 1980)

Personal information
- Date of birth: 19 December 1980 (age 45)
- Position: Midfielder

Senior career*
Years	Team	Apps	(Gls)
1996–1997	Shooting Stars S.C.		
1997–1998	Reggiana		
1998–1999	Zagłębie Lubin	2	(0)
- * Club domestic league appearances and goals

Austine Igbinosa (born 19 December 1980) is a former professional footballer who played as a midfielder. He joined Ekstraklasa club Zagłębie Lubin from Italian side Reggiana and made two appearances. He was the first Togolese player to appear in the Polish first tier.
