= James Morgan Read =

American academic (1908–1985)

James Morgan Read, II
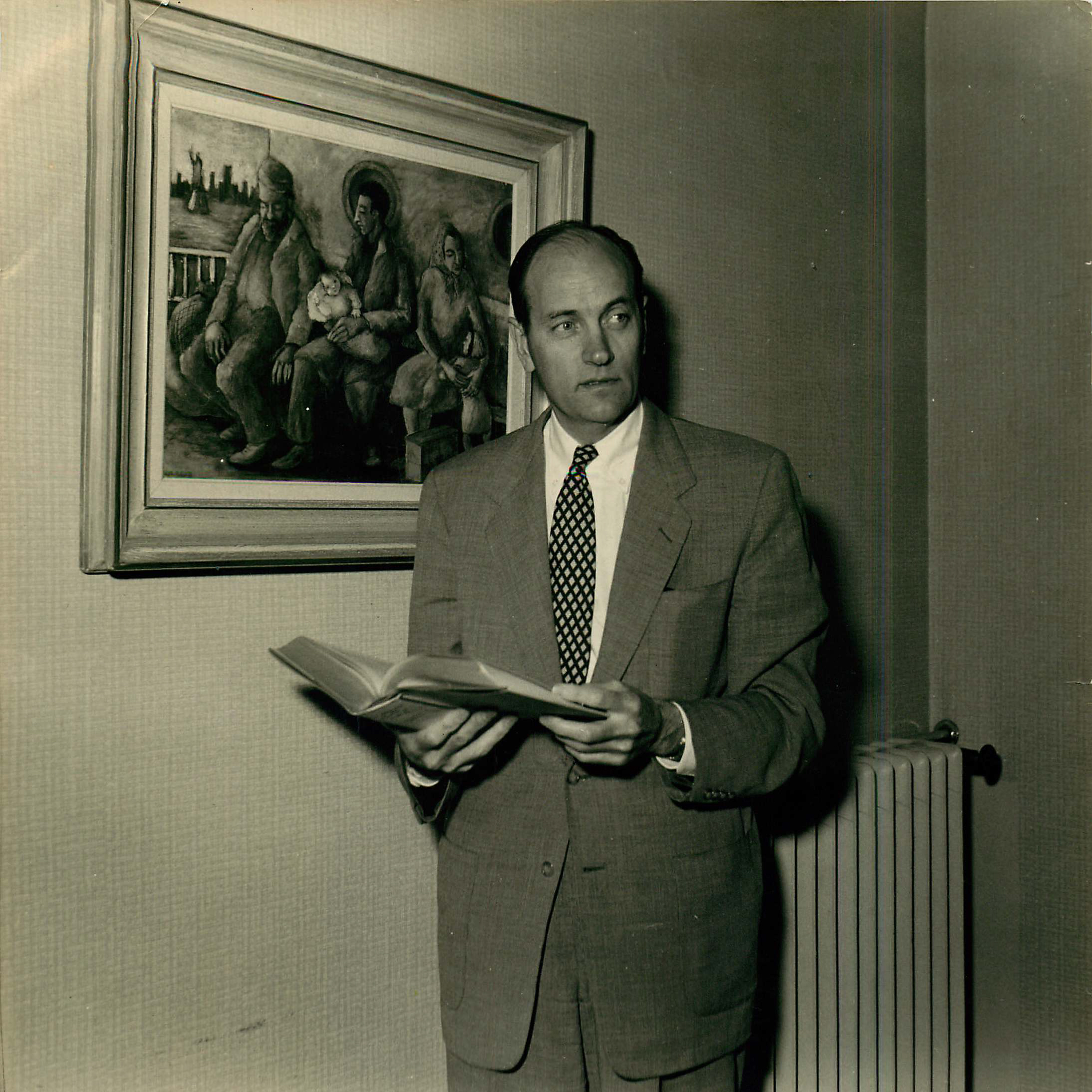
- Read c. 1950
- Born: 1908; Camden, New Jersey, U.S.
- Died: 1985 (aged 76–77); New York, New York, U.S.
- Education: Dickinson College; D. Phil., University of Marburg (1932); Ph.D., University of Chicago (1940)
- Spouse(s): Henrietta Morton (d. 1976); Theresa K. Dintenfass (d. 2004)
- Children: 3

James Morgan Read, II (1908–1985) was a Quaker and President of Wilmington College, Ohio from 1960 to 1969. He also served as United Nations Deputy High Commissioner from 1951 to 1960, and was a vice president of the Charles F. Kettering Foundation from 1969 until his retirement in 1974.

== Early life ==
Read was born in Camden, New Jersey, the son of James Morgan Read Sr., a Methodist Minister. He graduated from Dickinson College, Pennsylvania, in 1929, and went on to earn a D. Phil. from Marburg University in 1932, and a Ph.D. from the University of Chicago in 1940.

== Career ==
From 1932 to 1934 Read taught history at Lycoming College and served as Associate Professor of History and then Chairman of the Social Sciences Department at the University of Louisville from 1935 to 1943. In 1940 he married Henrietta Morton.

In 1941 he authored Atrocity Propaganda, 1914-1919, a book critical of allied deception techniques in propaganda during the first world war, originally published for the University of Louisville by Yale University Press.

From 1943 to 1945, as a conscientious objector, Read was employed in the Civilian Public Service, after which he took a job as Associate Secretary of the Friends Committee on National Legislation in Washington DC, where he focused his efforts on legislation for displaced persons. He continued this work as Secretary in the Foreign Service Section of the American Friends Service Committee from 1947 to 1949, overseeing the organization's relief work in the immediate postwar period.

In 1949, Read joined the Society of Friends as a member of the Gwynedd, Pennsylvania, Monthly Meeting. In 1950 he was named Chief of the Division of Education and Cultural Relations of the United States High Commissioner for Germany. From 1951 to 1960 he served as the United Nations Deputy High Commissioner for Refugees in Geneva, and was briefly appointed Acting High Commissioner for a few months in 1956. He returned to the academic world as President of Wilmington College, Ohio from 1960 to 1969.

Read stepped down as President of Wilmington College in 1969 to become vice-president of the Charles F. Kettering Foundation. In 1974, when he attained the mandatory retirement age, Read chose to continue his association with the Foundation, serving as Senior Consultant in International Affairs. Two years after Henrietta Read's sudden death from cancer in 1976, James Read married Theresa K. Dintenfass.

In his capacity as Senior Consultant in International Affairs, Read was involved in three of the Dartmouth Conferences (XII, XIII, and XIV), a series of informal talks between leading citizens of the US and USSR initiated at the suggestion of President Eisenhower and administered and co-sponsored by the Kettering Foundation. He also acted as Rapporteur for the third Soviet-American Writers Conference held in the USSR in 1979.

Read also wrote a report for Kettering on the Council on Foreign Relations' fifth Conference on the US-Canada Relationship in 1981. Read maintained his involvement with the American Friends Service Committee, serving on the AFSC Board of Directors as member and Chair of the AFSC Information and Interpretation Committee. He was also Clerk of the Quaker United Nations Committee in New York and made a study of the Special Committee of the UN General Assembly Banning the Use of Force. His experience with the UN also led to his involvement with the US Committee for the United Nations Institute for Training and Research. In 1983, he acted as a Consultant to Crosscurrents to study the possibility of establishing an office for the Friedrich Naumann Foundation.

== Selected bibliography ==
- Atrocity Propaganda, 1914-1919. New Haven: Yale University Press for University of Louisville, 1941. Reprinted by Arno Press in 1972.
