= Italian entry into World War I =

The Kingdom of Italy entered into the First World War in 1915 with the aim of completing national unity: for this reason, the Italian intervention in the First World War is also considered the Fourth Italian War of Independence, in a historiographical perspective that identifies in the latter the conclusion of the unification of Italy, whose military actions began during the revolutions of 1848 with the First Italian War of Independence.

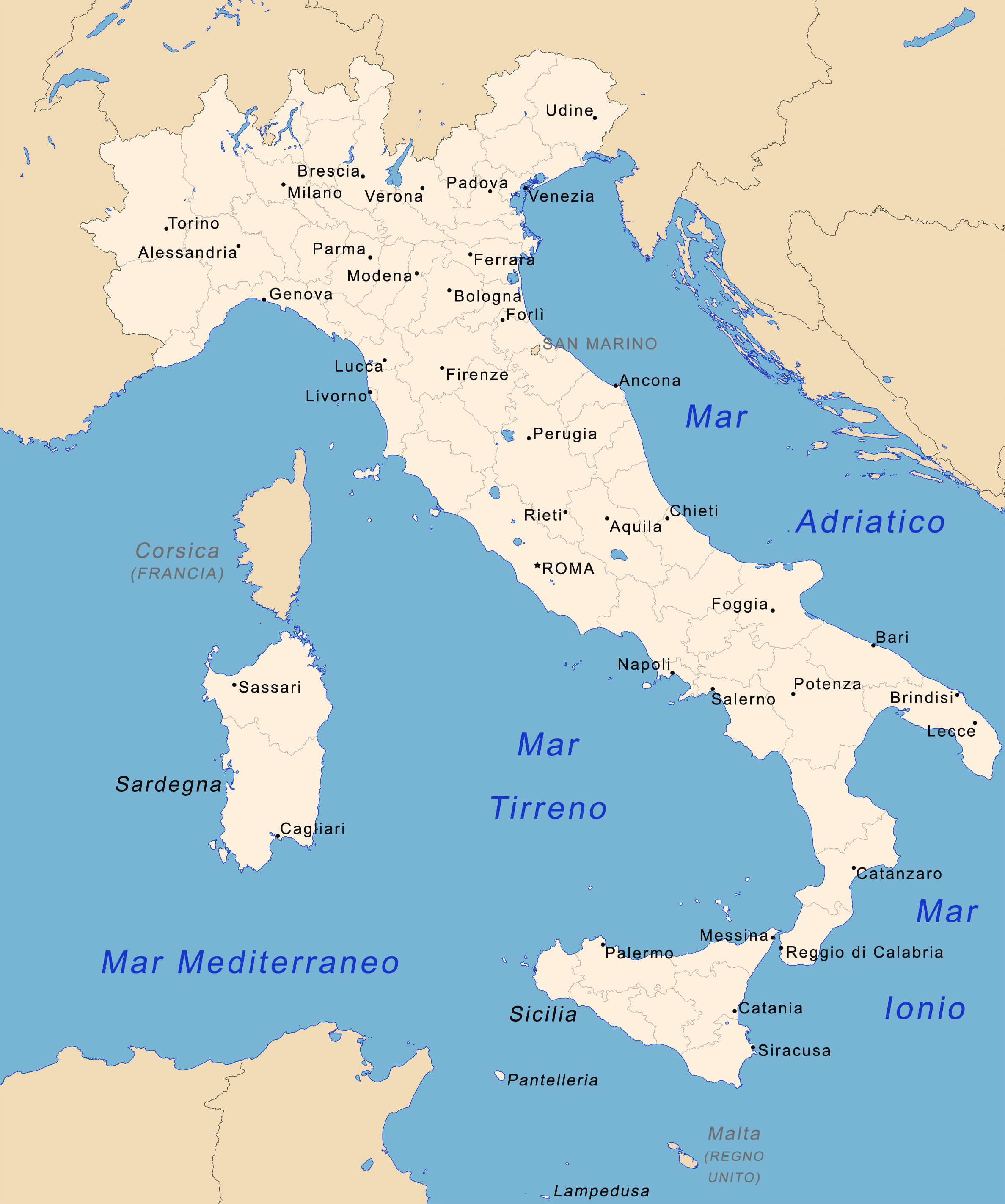
On the left, a map of the Kingdom of Italy before the First World War, on the right, a map of the Kingdom of Italy after the First World War.

== Premises ==
After the Capture of Rome (1870), almost the whole of Italy was united in a single state, the Kingdom of Italy. However, the so-called "irredent lands" were missing, that is, Italian-speaking, geographically or historically Italian lands that were not yet part of the unitary state. Among the irredent lands still belonging to Austria-Hungary were usually indicated as such: Julian March (with the city of Fiume), Trentino-Alto Adige and Dalmatia.

The Italian irredentism movement, which aimed at the reunification of the aforementioned with the motherland and therefore their consequent redemption, was active between the last decades of the 19th century and the early 20th century. It was precisely in the irredentist sphere that the theme of the need for a "Fourth Italian War of Independence" against Austria-Hungary began to develop in the last decades of the 19th century, when Italy was still firmly incorporated in the Triple Alliance; also the Italo-Turkish War was seen, in the irredentist context, as part of this theme.

== Treaty of London ==
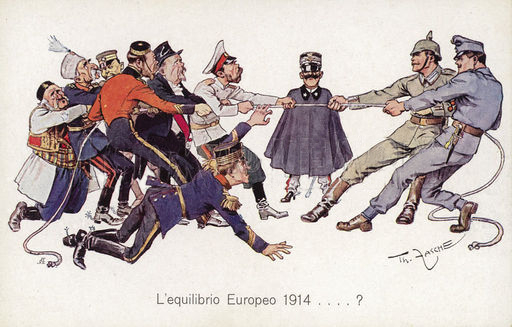
Satirical cartoon: Victor Emmanuel in the center witnesses the European balance in the tug of war between the Central Powers on the right and the other states on the left.

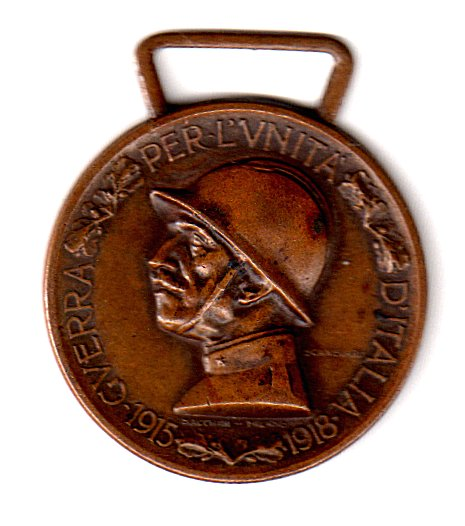
Obverse of the Commemorative Medal for the Italo-Austrian War 1915–1918; the inscription reads "War for the unification of Italy 1915-1918"

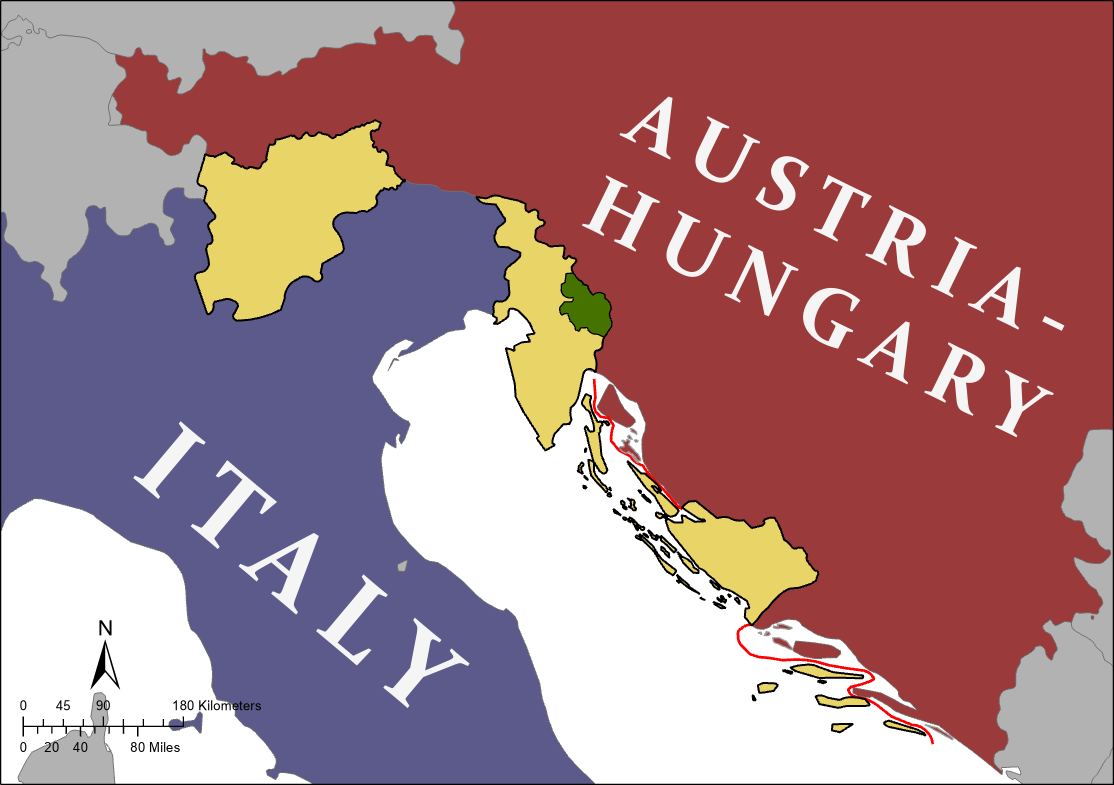
Territories promised to Italy by the Treaty of London (1915), i.e. Trentino-Alto Adige, Julian March and Dalmatia (tan), and the Snežnik Plateau area (green). Dalmatia, after the WWI, however, was not assigned to Italy but to Yugoslavia

When World War I broke out in August 1914, Italy declared neutrality. Although nominally allied with the German Empire and the Empire of Austria-Hungary in the Triple Alliance, the Kingdom of Italy did not join the Central Powers; in fact, Germany and Austria–Hungary had taken the offensive while the Triple Alliance was supposed to be a defensive alliance. Moreover, the Triple Alliance recognized that both Italy and Austria-Hungary were interested in the Balkans and required both to consult each other before changing the status quo and to provide compensation for whatever advantage in that area: Austria-Hungary did consult Germany but not Italy before issuing the ultimatum to Serbia, and refused any compensation before the end of the war. Italy negotiated for a better deal with the Allies, especially in terms of gaining territory from the Austro-Hungarian Empire. Italy's neutrality also favored the Spanish's neutrality.

However, Russia had its own pro-Slavic interests in the Balkans; with her ally Serbia claiming much of the same territory sought by Italian irrendists, complicating negotiations. Russia's position was greatly weakened by heavy military losses throughout the first year of the war. In the face of insistence from London and Paris, Russia, by April 1915, abandoned its support for most of Serbia's claims and accepted terms for Italy's entry into the war, which would limit the Russian strategic presence in the postwar Adriatic. Italy accepted the Allies’ offer in which Italy would receive a slice of Austria and a slice of the Ottoman Empire after the defeat of the Central Powers. This was formalised by the Treaty of London. In 1915, Italy entered the war joining the Triple Entente (i.e. the Allies).

Public and elite opinion was split on the wisdom of entering the war, for either side. Italy was very poorly prepared, the army was not well trained, and there was too small an industrial and financial base. A handful of leaders made the basic decisions, notably Prime Minister Antonio Salandra and especially the two foreign ministers Antonio di San Giuliano and Sidney Sonnino. They optimistically expected that victory would bring new territories and new glory, hopefully closing some of Italy's internal conflicts. The country made a fundamental contribution to defeating the Central Powers and Italy was recognized as one of the "Big Three" top Allied powers. Under the Peace Treaties of Saint-Germain, Rapallo and Rome, Italy gained a permanent seat in the League of Nations's executive council. Despite the increased international prestige, expectations of territorial expansion fell short. After the war, Italy never received any portion or "slice" of the Ottoman Empire, further, the Allies granted Italy barely half of the European territories that had been promised-prompting nationalists to label the result as a "Mutilated victory"; that angry sentiment helped to the rise of the fascist dictatorship of Benito Mussolini in 1922.

Military alignments in 1914. When the war started Italy declared neutrality; in 1915 it switched and joined the Triple Entente (i.e. the Allies).

Roy Pryce summarized the bitter experience:

The government's hope was that the war would be the culmination of Italy's struggle for national independence. Her new allies promised her the 'natural frontiers' which she had so long sought- the Trentino and Trieste-and something more. At the end of hostilities she did indeed extend her territory, but she came away from the peace conference dissatisfied with her reward for three and a half years' bitter warfare, having lost half a million of her noblest youth, with her economy impoverished and internal divisions more bitter than ever. That strife could not be resolved within the framework of the old parliamentary regime. The war that was to have been the climax of the Risorgimento produced the Fascist dictatorship. Something, somewhere, had gone wrong.

== Leadership ==
The Italian leadership was inexperienced, unfamiliar with international affairs, and often quite ill. Forces outside the government played minor roles. The business and financial communities wanted peace, but they were ignored in the decision-making. Likewise intellectuals and foreign policy experts, as well as nationalistic pressure groups, were ignored. The King (since July 1900 it was Victor Emmanuel III) had nominal power over war and peace, but he had severe psychiatric problems in 1914, and in any case he turned over all major issues to his cabinet. Prime Minister Antonio Salandra took office in March 1914, had little experience in foreign affairs, and had no talent or taste for statecraft. The decision for war was in the hands of Foreign Minister Antonio di San Giuliano, an experienced diplomat, cynical and cautious. He was in poor health and died in October 1914. He was replaced by Sidney Sonnino, who maneuvered to join the Allies primarily to gain territory. Tommaso Tittoni, the ambassador to France, was often consulted; he also pled for joining the Allies. Civilian politicians marginalized the generals; the chief of staff died on July 1, and he was finally replaced by General Luigi Cadorna in late July. Cadorna exaggerated the Italian Army's capabilities to the unsuspecting civilians, while working hard to remove its weaknesses. All of the leaders distrusted Austria, and were eager to take control of the Austrian province of Trentino-Alto-Adige in the Alps, and the Austrian city of Trieste. They all distrusted the Ottoman Empire, and were proud that Italy had recently seized control of the Ottoman holdings in Libya. Italy, Austria and Serbia were all contending for control of Albania.

== Prelude to war ==
Italy was a formal member of the Triple Alliance, alongside Germany and Austria-Hungary. However it also maintained good relations with France and Russia. The other countries understood this duality, and did not expect Italy to join in the war in 1914. Its treaty obligations did not require it to join with Germany and Austria, and it saw very little to gain from doing so. Public opinion wanted peace, and the leadership in Rome realized how poorly prepared the nation was in contrast to the powerhouses at war. By late 1914, however, Prime Minister Antonio Salandra and Foreign Minister Sidney Sonnino decided that major territorial gains were possible by joining the Allies, and would help calm extremely serious internal dissension, by bringing glory to the victorious army, as well as satisfying popular feeling by freeing Italian-speaking territories from Austrian rule. There were also new patronage opportunities and political victories for the politicians. They planned to argue, plausibly, that these results would be the triumphant climax of "Risorgimento" (that is, Italian unification). In December 1914 Sonnino opened negotiations in Vienna, asking for territorial compensation in return for remaining neutral. These talks were designed to conceal the government's true intentions from the Italian public opinion, and from the countries at war. In March 1915 Sonnino began serious negotiations with London and France . The Treaty of London was signed on 26 April 1915 and Italy declared war against Austria-Hungary on 23 May 1915. Salandra boasted that the Pact of London was "the greatest, if not the first completely spontaneous act of foreign policy executed by Italy since the Risorgimento."

From the standpoint of its erstwhile allies, Italy's recent success in occupying Libya as a result of the Italo-Turkish War had sparked tension with its Triple Alliance allies, who had been seeking closer relations with the Ottoman Empire. Germans reacted to Italy's aggression by singing anti-Italian songs. Italy's relations with France remained tense: France still felt betrayed by Italy's refusal to help in the Franco-Prussian War back in 1870. Italy's relations with Great Britain had been impaired by constant Italian demands for more recognition in the international stage following its occupation of Libya and its demands that other nations accept its spheres of influence in Eastern Africa and the Mediterranean Sea.

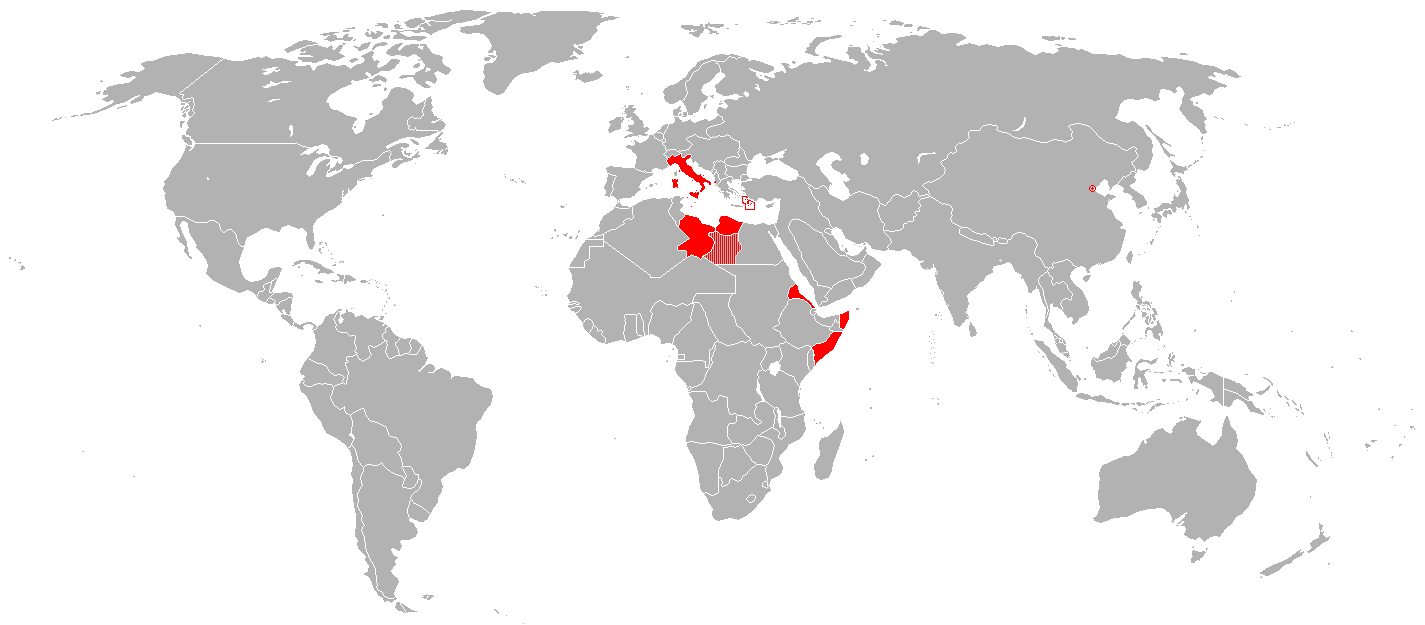
Italy and its colonial possessions in 1914.

In the Mediterranean, Italy's relations with Greece were aggravated when Italy occupied the Greek-populated Dodecanese Islands, including Rhodes, from 1912 to 1914. These islands had been formerly controlled by the Ottoman Empire. Italy and Greece were also in open rivalry over the desire to occupy Albania. King Victor Emmanuel III himself was uneasy about Italy pursuing distant colonial adventures and said that Italy should prepare to take back Italian-populated land from Austria-Hungary as the "completion of the Risorgimento". This idea put Italy at odds with Austria-Hungary.

Freemasonry was an influential semi-secret force in Italian politics with a strong presence among professionals and the middle class across Italy, as well as among the leadership in parliament, public administration, and the army. The two main organizations were the Grand Orient and the Grand Lodge of Italy. They had 25,000 members in 500 or more lodges. Freemasons took on the challenge of mobilizing the press, public opinion, and the leading political parties in support of Italy's joining the war as an ally of France and Great Britain. In 1914–15 they temporarily dropped their traditional pacifistic rhetoric and adopted the objectives of the nationalists. Freemasonry had historically promoted cosmopolitan universal values, and by 1917 onwards they reverted to their internationalist stance and pressed for the creation of a League of Nations to promote a new post-war universal order based upon the peaceful coexistence of independent and democratic nations.

== Internal instability ==
A major hindrance to Italy's decision on what to do about the war was the political instability throughout Italy in 1914. After the formation of the government of Prime Minister Salandra in March 1914, the government attempted to win the support of nationalists and moved to the political right.

At the same time, the left became more repulsed by the government after the killing of three anti-militarist demonstrators in June. Many elements of the left including syndicalists, republicans and anarchists protested against this and the Italian Socialist Party declared a general strike in Italy. The protests that ensued became known as "Red Week", as leftists rioted and various acts of civil disobedience occurred in major cities and small towns such as seizing railway stations, cutting telephone wires and burning tax-registers. However, only two days later the strike was officially called off, though the civil strife continued.

Militarist nationalists and anti-militarist leftists fought on the streets until the Italian Royal Army forcefully restored calm after having used thousands of men to put down the various protesting forces. Following the invasion of Serbia by Austria-Hungary in 1914, World War I broke out as Germany and Austria stood opposed to Serbia, Russia, France and Britain. Despite Italy's official alliance to Germany and membership in the Triple Alliance, it remained neutral, claiming that the Triple Alliance was only for defensive purposes.

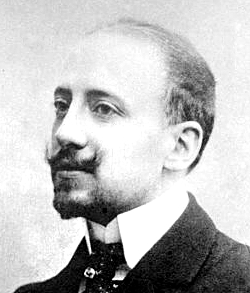
Gabriele D'Annunzio, national poet (vate) of Italy was the voice of nationalist revolutionaries calling for joining the Allies

Society was divided over the war: Italian socialists generally opposed the war and supported pacifism, while nationalists militantly supported the war. Long-time nationalists Gabriele D'Annunzio and Luigi Federzoni and a Marxist journalist once praised by Lenin, now a new convert to nationalist sentiment, Benito Mussolini, demanded that Italy join the war. For nationalists, Italy had to maintain its alliance with Germany and Austria in order to gain colonial territories at the expense of France. For the liberals, the war presented Italy a long-awaited opportunity to use an alliance with the Entente to gain territories from Austria-Hungary, which had long been part of Italian patriotic aims since unification. Luigi Federzoni emphasized the need to join the war and warned of continued disunity if it did not:

Italy has awaited this since 1866 her truly national war, in order to feel unified at last, renewed by the unanimous action and identical sacrifice of all her sons. Today, while Italy still wavers before the necessity imposed by history, the name of Garibaldi, resanctified by blood, rises again to warn her that she will not be able to defeat the revolution save by fighting and winning her national war.
— Luigi Federzoni, 1915

Mussolini used his new newspaper Il Popolo d'Italia and his strong oratorical skills to urge nationalists and patriotic revolutionary leftists to join the Allies: "Enough of Libya, and on to Trento and Trieste". Mussolini argued that it was in the interests of all socialists to join the war to tear down the aristocratic Hohenzollern dynasty of Germany because it was the enemy of all European workers. Mussolini and other nationalists warned the Italian government that Italy must join the war or face revolution and called for violence against pacifists and neutralists. Left-wing nationalism also erupted in Southern Italy as socialist and nationalist Giuseppe De Felice Giuffrida saw joining the war as essential to relieving southern Italy of the rising cost of bread which had caused riots in the south, and advocated a "war of revolution".

== A bidding war: bargaining with both sides ==
Italy joined the war in order to seek territories deemed part of the nation still occupied by foreign powers, as well as to dissolve the intense internal disharmony through unity of purpose among the people. The strategy was to bargain for the best possible offer in terms of both territorial gains and coverage of Italian financial and military weaknesses.

By August 1914 Russia was eager for Italy's entry into the war, expecting it would open a new front that would paralyze any Austrian offensive. Russia had nothing to give Italy, so there were no results. Rome refused to make a commitment, and there was a pause when Foreign Minister San Giuliano died in October. His replacement Sonnino planned to join the winning side in order to gain new territory. At first he expected the Central Powers to win, but the war looked more like a long one, so it was not necessary to hurry and join in. Austria had too little to offer and was showing its military weakness. Berlin pressured Vienna to make more territorial concessions to Rome, but it was too little, too late as Sonnino turned to the Allies. They were more than willing to promise large territorial spoils taken from Austria and Turkey. Italy's very long coastline made it exposed to the vastly superior power of the Allied navies. Public opinion was divided and Sonnino used that to mislead the cabinet. By February 1915 he was negotiating with both sides, but had decided that the Allies were making the better offer. He ignored the poor state of the Italian military, expecting that Britain and France would do all the fighting that was necessary. The Italian treasury could not fund a war, but again there were promises of money and munitions from London and Paris. In April 1915 Italy signed the London Pact with Britain and France. The pact ensured Italy the right to attain all Italian-populated lands it wanted from Austria-Hungary, as well as concessions in the Balkan Peninsula and suitable compensation for any territory gained by the Allies from Germany in Africa. Italy declared war a month later and invaded Austria from the south.

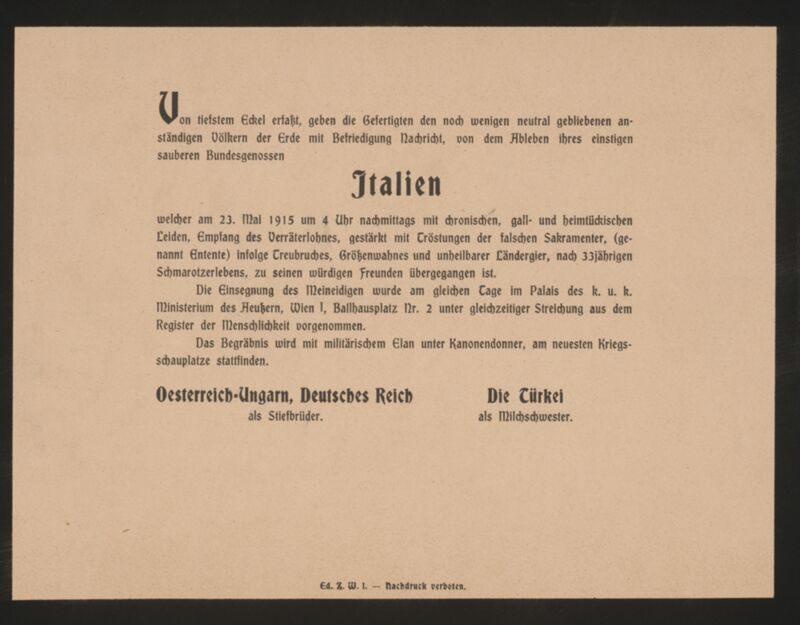
An Anti-Italian leaflet distributed by the Austro-Hungarian Empire, describing Italy's entry date in the war as the "date of death" of the Italian state

The reaction in Italy was divided: former Prime Minister Giovanni Giolitti was furious over Italy's decision to go to war against its two long-time former allies. Giolitti claimed that Italy would fail in the war, predicting high numbers of mutinies, Austro-Hungarian occupation of even more Italian territory. He warned that the failure would produce a catastrophic rebellion that would destroy the liberal-democratic monarchy and the liberal-democratic secular institutions of the state. Sonnino made the decision and ignored Giolitti's dire predictions, which actually became true in some way due to the post-war rise of Fascism.

One major result was that Italian nationalism was greatly strengthened and became a major force at both elite and popular levels until 1945, when popular democracy became a much more important force.

== See also ==
- Causes of World War I
  - Historiography of the causes of World War I
  - American entry into World War I
  - Austro-Hungarian entry into World War I
  - British entry into World War I
  - French entry into World War I
  - German entry into World War I
  - Ottoman entry into World War I
  - Russian entry into World War I
- Color books
- Diplomatic history of World War I
- Triple Alliance (1882)
- International relations of the Great Powers (1814–1919)
- Allies of World War I
- Home front during World War I covering all major countries
- Italian propaganda during World War I
- Military history of Italy during World War I
- Harukichi Shimoi
- Radiosomaggismo

== Notes ==
- Bosworth, Richard J. B. Italy and the Approach of the First World War (1983).
