= German entry into World War I =

Military alignments in 1912. When the war started Italy declared neutrality; in 1915 it switched and joined the Triple Entente (i.e. the Allies).

Germany entered into World War I on August 1, 1914, when it declared war on Russia. In accordance with its war plan, it ignored Russia and moved first against France–declaring war on August 3 and sending its main armies through Belgium to capture Paris from the north. The German invasion of Belgium caused the United Kingdom to declare war on Germany on August 4. Most of the main parties were now at war. In October 1914, the Ottoman Empire joined the war on Germany's side, becoming part of the Central Powers. Italy, which was allied with Germany and Austria-Hungary before World War I, was neutral in 1914 before switching to the Allied side in May 1915.

Historians have vigorously debated Germany's role. One line of interpretation, promoted by German historian Fritz Fischer in the 1960s, argues that Germany had long desired to dominate Europe politically and economically, and seized the opportunity that unexpectedly opened in July 1914, making Germany guilty of starting the war. At the opposite end of the moral spectrum, many historians have argued that the war was inadvertent, caused by a series of complex accidents that overburdened the long-standing alliance system with its lock-step mobilization system that no one could control. A third approach, especially important in recent years, is that Germany saw itself surrounded by increasingly powerful enemies – Russia, France and the UK – who would eventually crush it unless Germany acted defensively with a preemptive strike.

== Background ==
As the war started, Germany stood behind its ally Austria-Hungary in a confrontation with Serbia, but Serbia was under the protection of Russia, which was allied to France. Germany was the leader of the Central Powers, which included Austria-Hungary at the start of the war as well as the Ottoman Empire and Bulgaria; arrayed against them were the Allies, consisting chiefly of Russia, France, and Britain at the beginning of the war, Italy, which joined the Allies in 1915, and the United States, which joined the Allies in 1917.

There were several main causes of World War I, which broke out unexpectedly in June–August 1914, including the conflicts and hostility of the previous four decades. Militarism, alliances, imperialism, and ethnic nationalism played major roles. However, the immediate origins of the war lay in the decisions taken by statesmen and generals during the July Crisis of 1914, which was sparked by the assassination of Archduke Franz Ferdinand, heir to the throne of Austria-Hungary, by a Serbian secret organization, the Black Hand.

Since the 1870s or 1880s all the major powers had been preparing for a large-scale war, although none expected one. Britain focused on building up its Royal Navy, already stronger than the next two navies combined. Germany, France, Austria, Italy and Russia and some smaller countries set up conscription systems whereby young men would serve from one to three years in the army, then spend the next 20 years or so in the reserves with annual summer training. Men of higher social status became officers.

Each country devised a mobilisation system whereby the reserves could be called up quickly and sent to key points by rail. Every year the plans were updated and increased in complexity. Each country stockpiled arms and supplies for an army that ran into the millions. Germany in 1874 had a regular professional army of 420,000, with an additional 1.3 million reserves. By 1897, the regular German army was 545,000 strong and the reserves 3.4 million. The French in 1897 had 3.4 million reservists, Austria 2.6 million, and Russia 4.0 million. All major countries had a general staff which designed war plans against possible enemies. All plans called for a decisive opening and a short war. Germany's Schlieffen Plan was the most elaborate; the German Army was so confident that it would succeed that they made no alternative plans. It was kept secret from Austria, as well as from the German Navy, the chancellor and the foreign ministry, so there was no coordination–and in the end the plan failed. Indeed there was no joint planning with Vienna before the war started—and very little afterwards.

== Leadership ==
Historians focus on a handful of German leaders, as was the case for most countries in 1914. For Germany special attention focuses on the Chancellor Theobald von Bethmann Hollweg, thanks to the discovery of the very rich, candid diary of his top aide Kurt Riezler.

Wilhelm II, German Emperor, the Kaiser, was given enormous publicity by both sides and signed off on major decisions, but he was largely shunted aside or persuaded by others.

Helmuth von Moltke, the Chief of the German General Staff, was in charge of all planning and operations for the German army. He kept his plans quiet. He had the Kaiser's approval but did not share any details with the Navy, the Chancellor, or his allies. Increasingly as a crisis grew, Moltke became the most powerful man in Germany.

=== Public opinion ===
Public opinion and pressure groups played a major role in influencing German politics. The Army and Navy each had their nationwide network of supporters, with a million members in the German Navy League, founded in 1898, and 20,000 in the German Army League, founded in 1912. The most articulate and aggressive civilian organization was the "Pan-German League". The agrarian interest was led by large landowners who were especially interested in exports and was politically well organized. Major corporations in the steel and coal industries were effective lobbyists. All of these economic groups promoted an aggressive foreign policy. Bankers and financiers were not as pacifistic as their counterparts in London, but they did not play a large role in shaping foreign policy.

Pacifism had its well-organized groups, and the labor unions strongly denounced war before it was declared. In the 1912 elections, the Socialists (Social Democratic Party or SPD), based in the labor unions, won 35% of the national vote. Conservative elites exaggerated the implicit threats made by radical Socialists such as August Bebel and became alarmed. Some looked to a foreign war as a solution to Germany's internal problems; others considered ways to suppress the Socialists. SPD policy limited antimilitarism to aggressive wars—Germans saw 1914 as a defensive war. On 25 July 1914, the SPD leadership appealed to its membership to demonstrate for peace and large numbers turned out in orderly demonstrations. The SPD was not revolutionary and many members were nationalistic. When the war began, some conservatives wanted to use force to suppress the SPD, but Bethmann Hollweg wisely refused. The SPD members of parliament voted 96–14 on 3 August to support the war. There remained an antiwar element, especially in Berlin. They were expelled from the SPD in 1916 and formed the Independent Social Democratic Party of Germany.

Newspaper editorials indicated that the nationalist right wing was openly in favor of war, even a preventive one, while moderate editors would only support a defensive war. Both the conservative press and the liberal press increasingly used the rhetoric of German honor and popular sacrifice and often depicted the horrors of Russian despotism in terms of Asiatic barbarism.

== German goals ==
Historian Fritz Fischer unleashed an intense worldwide debate in the 1960s on Germany's long-term goals. American historian Paul Schroeder agrees with the critics that Fischer exaggerated and misinterpreted many points. However, Schroeder endorses Fischer's basic conclusion:

From 1890 on, Germany did pursue world power. This bid arose from deep roots within Germany's economic, political, and social structures. Once the war broke out, world power became Germany's essential goal.

However, Schroeder argues, all that was not the main cause of the war in 1914—indeed, the search for a single main cause is not a helpful approach to history. Instead, there are multiple causes any one or two of which could have launched the war. He argues, "The fact that so many plausible explanations for the outbreak of the war have been advanced over the years indicates on the one hand that it was massively overdetermined, and on the other that no effort to analyze the causal factors involved can ever fully succeed."

Historians have stressed that insecurity about the future deeply troubled German policy makers and motivated them toward preemptive war before it was too late. The nation was surrounded by enemies who were getting stronger; the bid to rival British naval supremacy had failed. Berlin was deeply suspicious of a supposed conspiracy of its enemies: that year-by-year in the early 20th century it was systematically encircled by enemies. There was a growing fear that the supposed enemy coalition of Russia, France and Britain was getting stronger militarily every year, especially Russia. The longer Berlin waited the less likely it would prevail in a war. According to American historian Gordon A. Craig, it was after the set-back in Morocco in 1905 that the fear of encirclement began to be a potent factor in German politics." Few outside observers agreed with the notion of Germany as a victim of deliberate encirclement. English historian G. M. Trevelyan expressed the British viewpoint:

The encirclement, such as it was, was of Germany's own making. She had encircled herself by alienating France over Alsace-Lorraine, Russia by her support of Austria-Hungary's anti--Slav policy in the Balkans, England by building her rival fleet. She had created with Austria-Hungary a military bloc in the heart of Europe so powerful and yet so restless that her neighbors on each side had no choice but either to become her vassals or to stand together for protection....They used their central position to create fear in all sides, in order to gain their diplomatic ends. And then they complained that on all sides they had been encircled.

Bethmann Hollweg was mesmerized by the steady growth of Russian power, which was in large part due to French financial and technical assistance. For the Germans, this deepened the worry often expressed by the Kaiser that Germany was being surrounded by enemies who were growing in strength. One implication was that time was against them, and a war happening sooner would be more advantageous for Germany than a war happening later. For the French, there was a growing fear that Russia would become significantly more powerful than France, and become more independent of France, possibly even returning to its old military alliance with Germany. The implication was that a war sooner could count on the Russian alliance, but the longer it waited the greater the likelihood of a Russian alliance with Germany that would doom France.

France, a third smaller than Germany, needed Russia's vast potential, and the fear was that together the two would in a few years clearly surpass Germany's military capability. This argued for war sooner rather than later. Bethmann Hollweg knew he was undertaking a calculated risk by backing a local war in which Austria would politically destroy Serbia. The hope was to "localize" that war by keeping the other powers out of it. Russia had no treaty obligations to Serbia, but was trying to fashion itself as the leader of the Slavic peoples in opposition to their German and Austrian oppressors. If Russia intervened to defend Serbia, Germany would have to intervene to defend Austria, and very likely France would honor its treaty obligation and join with Russia. Bethmann Hollweg assumed Britain had no interest in the Balkans and would remain neutral. It was also possible that Russia would go to war but France would not follow, in which case the Triple Entente would become meaningless. The calculated risk failed when Russia mobilized. The German general staff, which was always hawkish and eager for war, now took control of German policy. Its war plan called for immediate action before Russia could mobilize much force, and instead use very rapid mobilization of German active duty and reserve forces to invade France through Belgium. Once France was knocked out, the German troops would be sent to the East to defeat Russia with the assistance of the Austrian army. Once Russia mobilized, on July 31, Austria and Germany mobilized. The Germans had a very sophisticated plan for rapid mobilization. It worked well while everyone else was days or weeks behind. The general staff convinced the Kaiser to activate their war plan, and Bethmann Hollweg could only follow along. Most historians treat the Kaiser as a man far out of his depth who was under the spell of the Army General staff.

In 1913, the Army Act raised Germany's peace strength to 870,000 men, and raising the eventual war strength from 4.5 million to 5.4 million. France responded by expanding the training period for all draftees from two years to three. Russia likewise raised its army size to a wartime basis of 5.4 million. Austria in 1913 raised its war strength to 2.0 million. All the rival armies improved their efficiency, especially with more powerful artillery and machine guns.

The main war plan, the Schlieffen Plan, was drawn up by the Army headquarters. It called for a great infantry sweep through Belgium to encircle Paris and defeat France in a matter of weeks. Then the forces would be moved by rail to the Eastern Front, to defeat the Russians. The plan was not shared with the Navy, the Foreign Office, the Chancellor, the main ally in Vienna, or the separate Army commands in Bavaria and the other states. No one could point out problems or plan to coordinate with it. The generals who did know about it counted on it giving a quick victory within weeks—if that did not happen there was no "Plan B." No German leaders had a long-term plan when the war began. There were no long-term goals—the first ones—the proposed “Septemberprogramm” was hurriedly put together in September 1914 after the war began and was never formally adopted.

== Rivalry with Britain ==
In explaining why neutral Britain went to war with Germany, Paul Kennedy (1980) recognized it was critical for war that Germany become economically more powerful than Britain, but he downplays the disputes over economic trade imperialism, the Baghdad Railway, confrontations in Central and Eastern Europe, highly-charged political rhetoric and domestic pressure groups. Germany's reliance time and again on sheer power, while Britain increasingly appealed to moral sensibilities, played a role, especially in seeing the invasion of Belgium as a profound moral and diplomatic crime. Kennedy argues that by far the main reason was London's fear that a repeat of 1870 — when Prussia and the German states smashed France in the Franco-Prussian War — would mean that Germany, with a powerful army and navy, would control the English Channel and northwest France. British policymakers insisted that that would be a catastrophe for British security.

=== Naval race ===
The British Royal Navy dominated the globe in the 19th century, but after 1890, Germany attempted to challenge Britain's supremacy. The resulting naval race heightened tensions between the two nations. In 1897, Admiral Alfred von Tirpitz became German Naval Secretary of State and began transformation of the Imperial German Navy from a small, coastal defence force to a fleet that was meant to challenge British naval power. As part of the wider bid to alter the international balance of power decisively in Germany's favour, Tirpitz called for a Risikoflotte (Risk Fleet), so called because, although still smaller than the British fleet, it would be too large for Britain to risk taking it on.

The German Navy, under Tirpitz, had ambitions to rival the Royal Navy and dramatically expanded its fleet in the early 20th century to protect the colonies, German commerce, the homeland, and to exert power worldwide. In 1890, to protect its new fleet, Germany traded possessions. It obtained the strategic island of Heligoland off the German North Sea coast and gave up the island of Zanzibar in Africa. In 1898, Tirpitz started a programme of warship construction. The British, however, were always well ahead in the race. The British Dreadnought battleship of 1907 was so advanced in terms of speed and firepower that all other warships were immediately made obsolete. Germany copied it but never surged ahead in quality or numbers.

== Blank cheque ==
Berlin repeatedly and urgently called on Vienna to act quickly in response to the assassination at Sarajevo on June 28, 1914, so that a counter alliance would not have time to organize, and Austria could blame its intense anger at the atrocious act. Vienna delayed its critical ultimatum until July 23, and its actual invasion until August 13. That allowed time for the Russian-French opposition to organize. It also allowed an investigation to turn up many details but no evidence pointing directly to the government of Serbia. The main reason for the delay was the fact that practically the entire Austrian army was tied down at home in harvest work, providing a food supply that would be essential for any war once the reserves were called to duty.

In July, 1914, Germany gave Austria a "blank cheque" in handling its punishment of Serbia regarding the assassination of the heir to the Austrian throne. It meant that Germany would support whatever decision Austria made. Austria decided on war with Serbia, which quickly led to escalation with Russia. Bethmann Hollweg on July 6 told the Austrian ambassador in Berlin:

Finally, as far as concerns Serbia, His Majesty, of course, cannot interfere in the dispute now going on between Austria-Hungary and that country, as it is a matter not within his competence. The Emperor Francis Joseph may, however, rest assured that His Majesty will faithfully stand by Austria-Hungary,[editor: Bethmann Hollweg here deleted the phrase "under all circumstances" which had appeared in his first draft] as is required by the obligations of his alliance and of his ancient friendship.

Shortly after the war began, the German foreign office issued a statement justifying the Blank Check as necessary for the preservation of Austria, and the Teutonic (German) race in central Europe. The statement said:

it was clear to Austria that it was not compatible with the dignity and the spirit of self-preservation of the monarchy to view idly any longer this agitation across the border. The Imperial and Royal Government appraised Germany of this conception and asked for our opinion. With all our heart we were able to agree with our ally's estimate of the situation, and assure him that any action considered necessary to end the movement in Servia [sic] directed against the conservation of the monarchy would meet with our approval. We were perfectly aware that a possible warlike attitude of Austria-Hungary against Servia might bring Russia upon the field, and that it might therefore involve us in a war, in accordance with our duty as allies. We could not, however, in these vital interests of Austria-Hungary, which were at stake, advise our ally to take a yielding attitude not compatible with his dignity, nor deny him our assistance in these trying days. We could do this all the less as our own interests were menaced through the continued Serb agitation. If the Serbs continued with the aid of Russia and France to menace the existence of Austria-Hungary, the gradual collapse of Austria and the subjection of all the Slavs under one Russian sceptre would be the consequence, thus making untenable the position of the Teutonic race in Central Europe.

== July Crisis and war ==
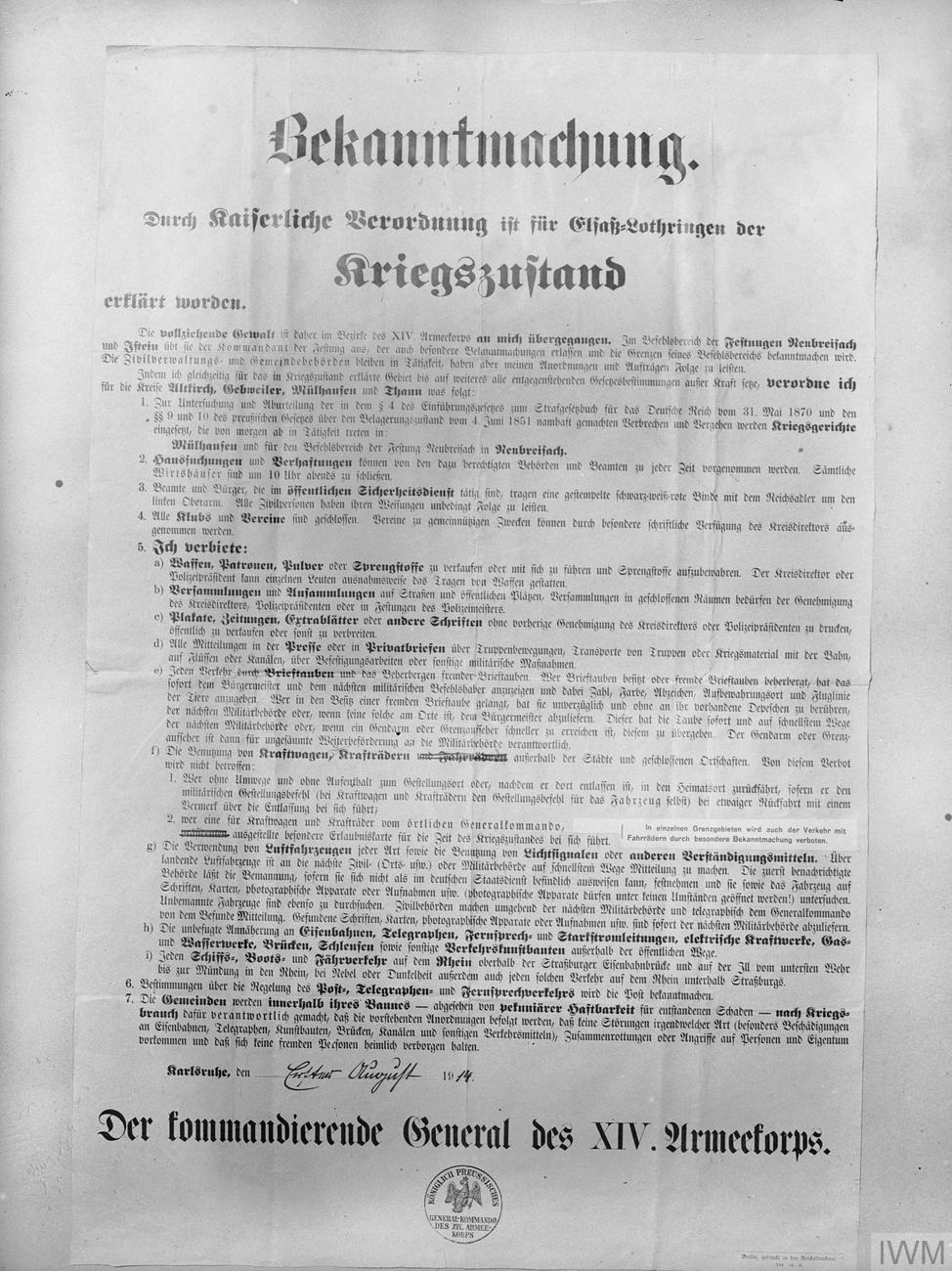
A proclamation by the XIV Army Corps from August 1914 giving notice that Alsace–Lorraine was in a state of war.

In early July 1914, in the aftermath of the assassination of Franz Ferdinand and the immediate likelihood of war between Austria-Hungary and Serbia, the German government informed the Austro-Hungarian government that Germany would uphold its alliance with Austria-Hungary and defend it from possible Russian intervention if a war between Austria-Hungary and Serbia took place.

Austria depended entirely on Germany for support – it had no other ally it could trust – but the Kaiser lost control of the German government. Bethmann Hollweg had repeatedly rejected pleas from Britain and Russia to put pressure on Austria to compromise. German elite and popular public opinion also was demanding mediation. Now in late July he reversed himself, and pleaded, or demanded, that Austria accept mediation, warning that Britain would probably join Russia and France if a larger war started. The Kaiser made a direct appeal to Emperor Franz Joseph along the same lines. However, Bethmann Hollweg and the Kaiser did not know that the German military had its own line of communication to the Austrian military, and insisted on rapid mobilization against Russia. German Chief of Staff Moltke sent an emotional telegram to the Austrian Chief of Staff Conrad on July 30: "Austria-Hungary must be preserved, mobilise at once against Russia. Germany will mobilise." Vienna officials decided that Moltke was really in charge – which was true – and refused mediation and mobilized against Russia.

When Russia enacted a general mobilization, Germany viewed the act as provocative. The Russian government promised Germany that its general mobilization did not mean preparation for war with Germany but was a reaction to the events between Austria-Hungary and Serbia. The German government regarded the Russian promise of no war with Germany to be nonsense in light of its general mobilization, and Germany, in turn, mobilized for war. On 1 August, Germany sent an ultimatum to Russia stating that since both Germany and Russia were in a state of military mobilization, an effective state of war existed between the two countries. Later that day, France, an ally of Russia, declared a state of general mobilization. The German government justified military action against Russia as necessary because of Russian aggression as demonstrated by the mobilization of the Russian army that had resulted in Germany mobilizing in response.

After Germany declared war on Russia, France with its alliance with Russia prepared a general mobilization in expectation of war. On 3 August 1914, Germany responded to this action by declaring war on France. Germany, facing a two-front war, enacted what was known as the Schlieffen Plan, which involved German armed forces needing to move through Belgium and swing south into France and towards the French capital of Paris. This plan aimed to gain a quick victory against the French and allow German forces to concentrate on the Eastern Front. Belgium was a neutral country and would not accept German forces crossing its territory. Germany disregarded Belgian neutrality and invaded the country to launch an offensive towards Paris. This caused Great Britain to declare war against the German Empire, as the action violated the Treaty of London that both Britain and Prussia had signed in 1839 guaranteeing Belgian neutrality and defense of the kingdom if a nation reneged.

Subsequently, several states declared war on Germany in late August 1914, with Italy declaring war on Austria-Hungary in 1915 and Germany on 27 August 1916; the United States on 6 April 1917 and Greece in July 1917.

Germany attempted to justify its actions through the publication of selected diplomatic correspondence in the German White Book which appeared on 4 August 1914, the same day as Britain's war declaration. In it, they sought to establish justification for their own entry into the war, and cast blame on other actors for the outbreak. The White Book was only the first of such compilations to occur, including the British Blue Book two days later, followed by numerous color books by the other European powers.

== Ottoman ally ==
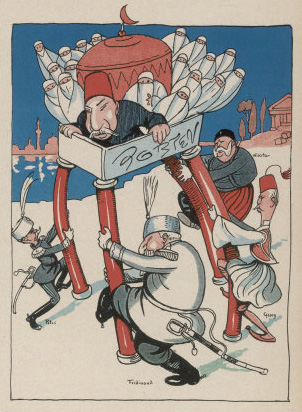
1912 Danish cartoon shows Balkan states tearing apart the rickety Ottoman Empire in the First Balkan War, October 1912

Turkey had been badly defeated in a series of wars in the previous decade, losing the two Balkan Wars of 1912–13 and the Italo-Turkish War in 1911–12. However, relations with Germany had been excellent, involving investment aid in financing, and assistance for the Turkish army. In late 1913 German general Liman von Sanders was hired to reorganize the army, and to command the Ottoman forces at Constantinople. Russia and France vigorously objected, and forced a reduction in his role. Russia had the long-term goal of sponsoring the newly liberated Slavic states in the Balkan region, and had designs on control of the Straits (allowing entry into the Mediterranean), and even taking over Constantinople.

There was a long-standing conflict between Britain and Germany over the Baghdad Railway through the Ottoman Empire, which would have projected German power toward Britain's sphere of influence in India and southern Persia. This was resolved in June 1914 when Berlin agreed not to construct the line south of Baghdad and to recognize Britain's preponderant interest in the region. The issue was resolved to the satisfaction of both sides and did not play a role in causing the war.

In June, 1914, Vienna and Berlin discussed bringing Bulgaria and Turkey into their military alliance to neutralize the threat of the Balkan League under Russian and French auspices. When the war broke out, the Ottoman Empire was officially neutral at first, but leaned toward the Central Powers. Promises of war loans, military coordination and recovery of lost territories appealed to Turkish nationalists, especially the Young Turks under Enver Pasha and the nationalist Committee of Union and Progress (CUP).

== See also ==
- History of Germany during World War I
- Anglo-German naval arms race
- Causes of World War I
  - Historiography of the causes of World War I
  - Austro-Hungarian entry into World War I
  - British entry into World War I
  - French entry into World War I
  - Italian entry into World War I
  - Ottoman entry into World War I
  - Russian entry into World War I
- Diplomatic history of World War I
- History of German foreign policy
- International relations of the Great Powers (1814–1919)
- Central Powers
- Allies of World War I
- Home front during World War I covering all major countries
