= Maurice Paléologue =

French diplomat and historian (1859–1944)

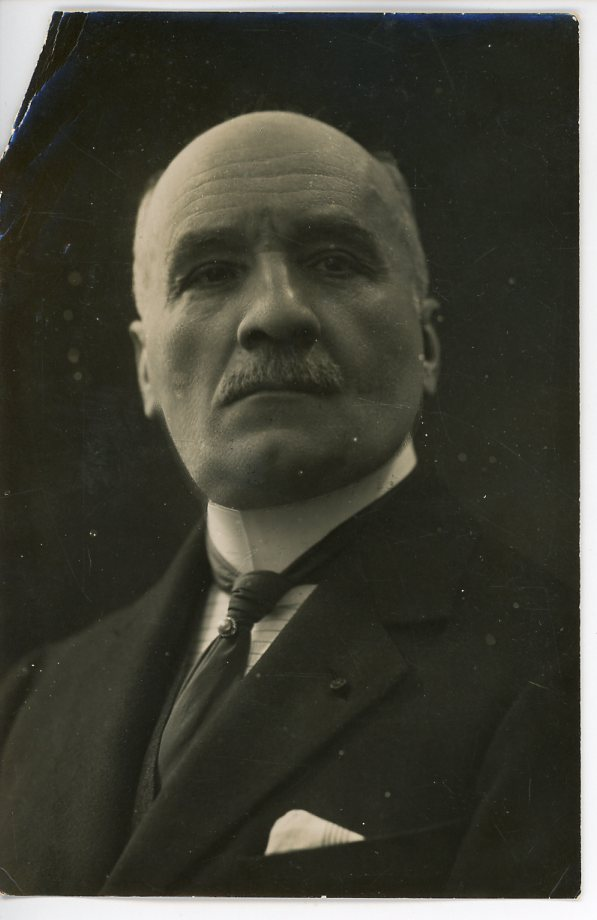
- Photo of Maurice Paléologue by Henri Manuel
- Born: 13 January 1859; Paris, France
- Died: 23 November 1944 (aged 85); Paris, France
- Occupations: Diplomat, Essayist
- Parents: Alexandru Gulianu-Paleologu (father); Fredrique de Ridder (mother)
- Relatives: Elisabeth Văcărescu (grandmother); Elisabeth Ypsilantis (cousin)

Maurice Paléologue (13 January 1859 – 23 November 1944) was a French diplomat, historian, and essayist. As the French ambassador to the Russian Empire (1914–1917), he supported the Russian mobilization against Germany that led to World War I and likewise played a major role in France's entry into the ensuing conflict.

== Biography ==
Paléologue was born in Paris as the son of Alexandru Gulianu-Paleologu (1824–1886), a Wallachian Romanian revolutionary who had fled to France after attempting to assassinate Prince Gheorghe Bibescu during the 1848 Wallachian revolution, and his wife, Frederique de Ridder (1829–1901), member of the Dutch nobility.

His father Alexandru was one of three illegitimate children of a clergyman Dimitriu and Elisabeth Văcărescu, member of the Văcărescu family of Romanian boyars. He and his siblings were later adopted by Zoe Gulianu-Paleologu, Elisabeth's mother, who gave the children her Greek maiden name Paleologu. The name became Paléologue in French language spellings. The family's relation to the Palaiologos Byzantine Imperial family is doubtful, though Alexandru's ancestors claimed it at the end of the 17th century.

== Diplomat ==
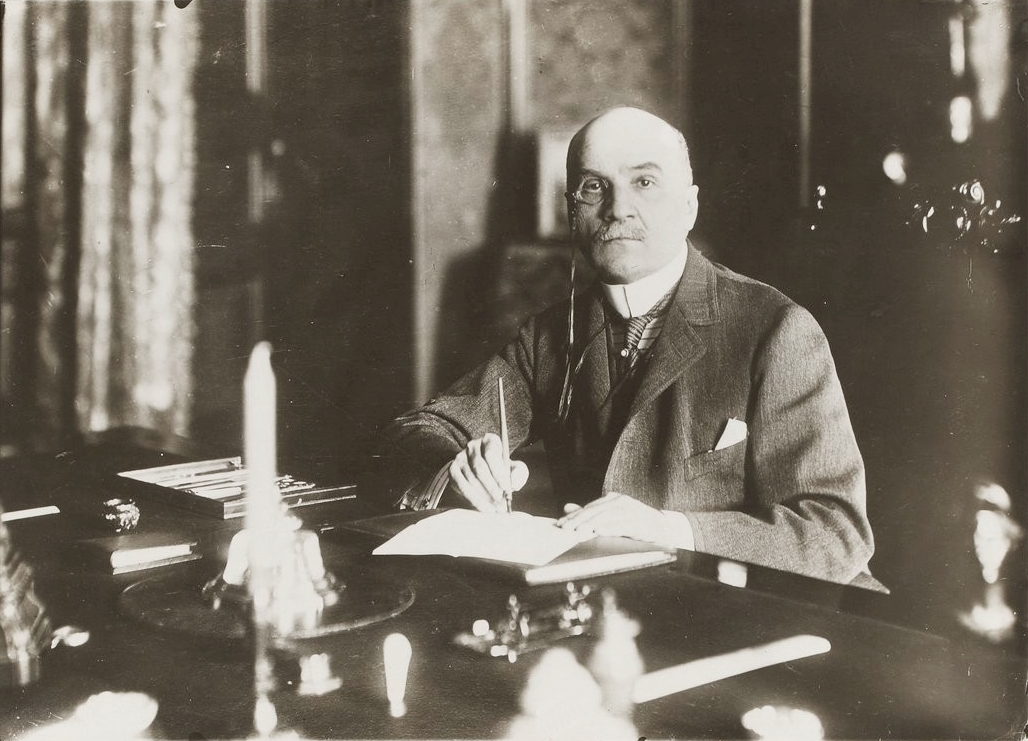
Maurice Paléologue in 1914.

After graduating in law, Paléologue obtained a position with the French Foreign Ministry in 1880 and moved on to become Embassy Secretary at Tangiers in the Sultanate of Morocco and then in Beijing (China) and later in Italy. A Minister Plenipotentiary in 1901, he represented France in Bulgaria (1907–1912) and Imperial Russia (1914–1917). He became General Secretary of the Foreign Ministry in the Alexandre Millerand cabinet.

An Austrian diplomat described his personality in 1911:

about 50 years old, unmarried ... [he is] prominent, vivacious, well educated, but displays a fantastic imagination and is an author of novels. [He] permits his novelist's imagination to run away with him when he interprets insignificant military or political events, and, for those who do not know him well, he is therefore dangerous as a source of information.

The British ambassador to St. Petersburg in 1914 provided a similar description:

He is a very cultivated man, a writer of light romances, as well as books of a more serious vein; but ... his vivid imagination is apt to run away with him and disposes him to take a fanciful and exaggerated view of the political questions with which he has to deal.

His most important and controversial role came when he was the French ambassador to Russia in July 1914. He hated Germany and believed that when war broke out, France and Russia had to be close allies against Germany. His approach agreed with French President Raymond Poincaré, who trusted him. He promised unconditional French support to Russia in the unfolding crisis with Germany and Austria-Hungary.

Historians debate whether he exceeded his instructions and thereby helped hasten the war. There is agreement that he failed to inform Paris of exactly what was happening and the implications of the Russian mobilisation in launching a world war.

At the beginning of 1917, both Paléologue and his British counterpart Sir George Buchanan became convinced that reforms in Russia were necessary, fearing that otherwise a revolution would overthrow the monarchy and Russia would in that case leave the war. In January 1917 he warned Tsar Nicholas II of Russia that a government should be established that should enjoy the confidence of the Duma. However, the tsar did not respond to Paléologue's warning. Ultimately, Paléologue witnessed the February Revolution of 1917 that brought down the monarchy. Later that year, Paléologue returned to France and in 1920 was Secretary-General of Foreign Affairs at the time of the Millerand cabinet.

== Later life ==
Paléologue published essays and novels, and wrote contributions for the Revue des deux mondes. He also wrote several works on the history of Russia in the wake of World War I that included an intimate portrait of the last tsaritsa, Alexandra Fyodorovna. He had been present at meetings between her and Grigori Rasputin, among others. He was called on to give his testimony during the Dreyfus Affair and left important notes on the topic.

Paléologue was elected a member of the Académie française in 1928. He died in Paris in 1944 aged 85, a few months after the city's liberation by the French Army.

== See also ==
- Russian entry into World War I
