= British entry into World War I =

The United Kingdom and the British Empire entered World War I on 4 August 1914, when King George V declared war after the expiry of an ultimatum to the German Empire. The official explanation focused on protecting Belgium as a neutral country; the main reason, however, was to prevent a French defeat that would have left Germany in control of Western Europe. The Liberal Party was in power with prime minister H. H. Asquith and foreign minister Edward Grey leading the way. The Liberal cabinet made the decision, although the party had been strongly anti-war until the last minute. The Conservative Party was pro-war. The Liberals knew that if they split on the war issue, they would lose control of the government to the Conservatives.

== Background ==
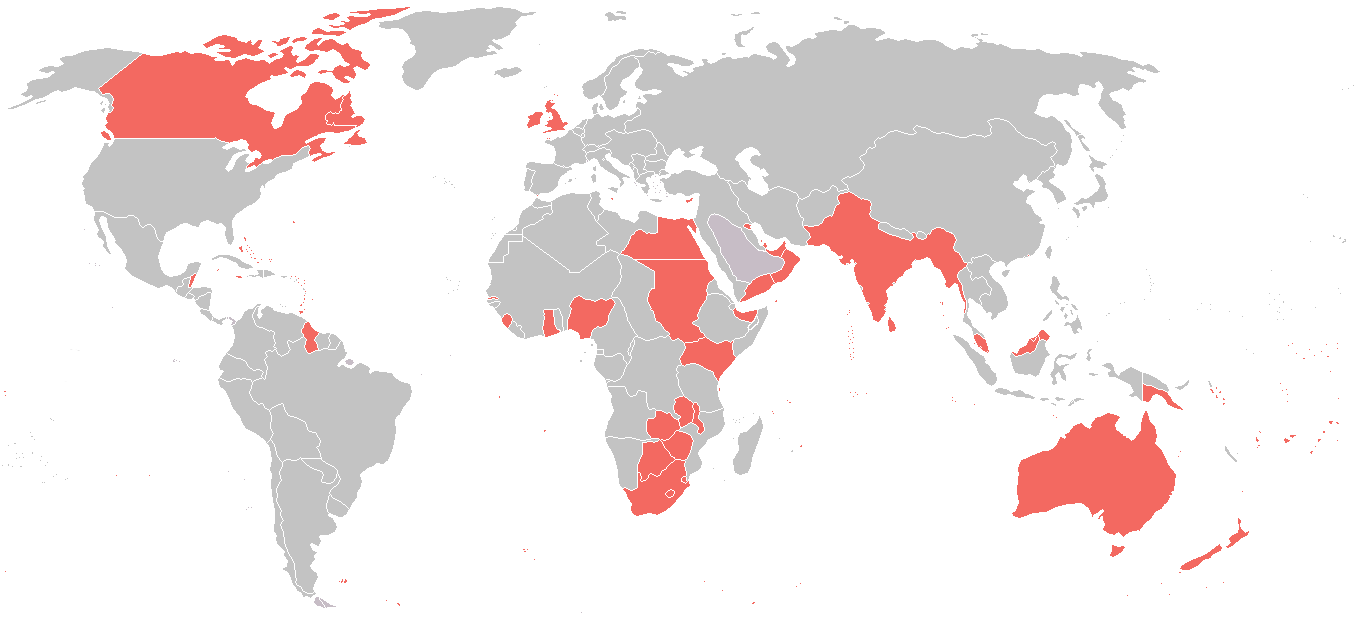
The British Empire in 1914

For much of the 19th century, Britain pursued a foreign policy later known as splendid isolation, which sought to maintain the balance of power in Europe without formal alliances. As Europe divided into two power blocs during the 1890s, the 1895–1905 Conservative government realised this left Britain dangerously exposed. This resulted in the 1902 Anglo-Japanese Alliance, followed by King Edward VII's 1903 visit to Paris. By reducing anti-British feeling in France, it led to the 1904 Entente Cordiale, the first tangible effect of which was British support for France against Germany in the 1905 Moroccan Crisis.

In 1907, the new Liberal government agreed to the Anglo-Russian Convention. Like the Entente, the Convention focused on resolving colonial disputes; but by doing so, it paved the way for wider co-operation and allowed Britain to refocus its naval resources in response to German naval expansion.

The 1911 Agadir Crisis encouraged secret military negotiations between France and Britain in the case of war with the German Empire. A British Expeditionary Force of 100,000 men would be landed in France within two weeks of war, while naval arrangements allocated responsibility for the Mediterranean Sea to the French Navy, with the Royal Navy looking after the North Sea and the English Channel, including Northern France.

== Antagonism with Germany ==
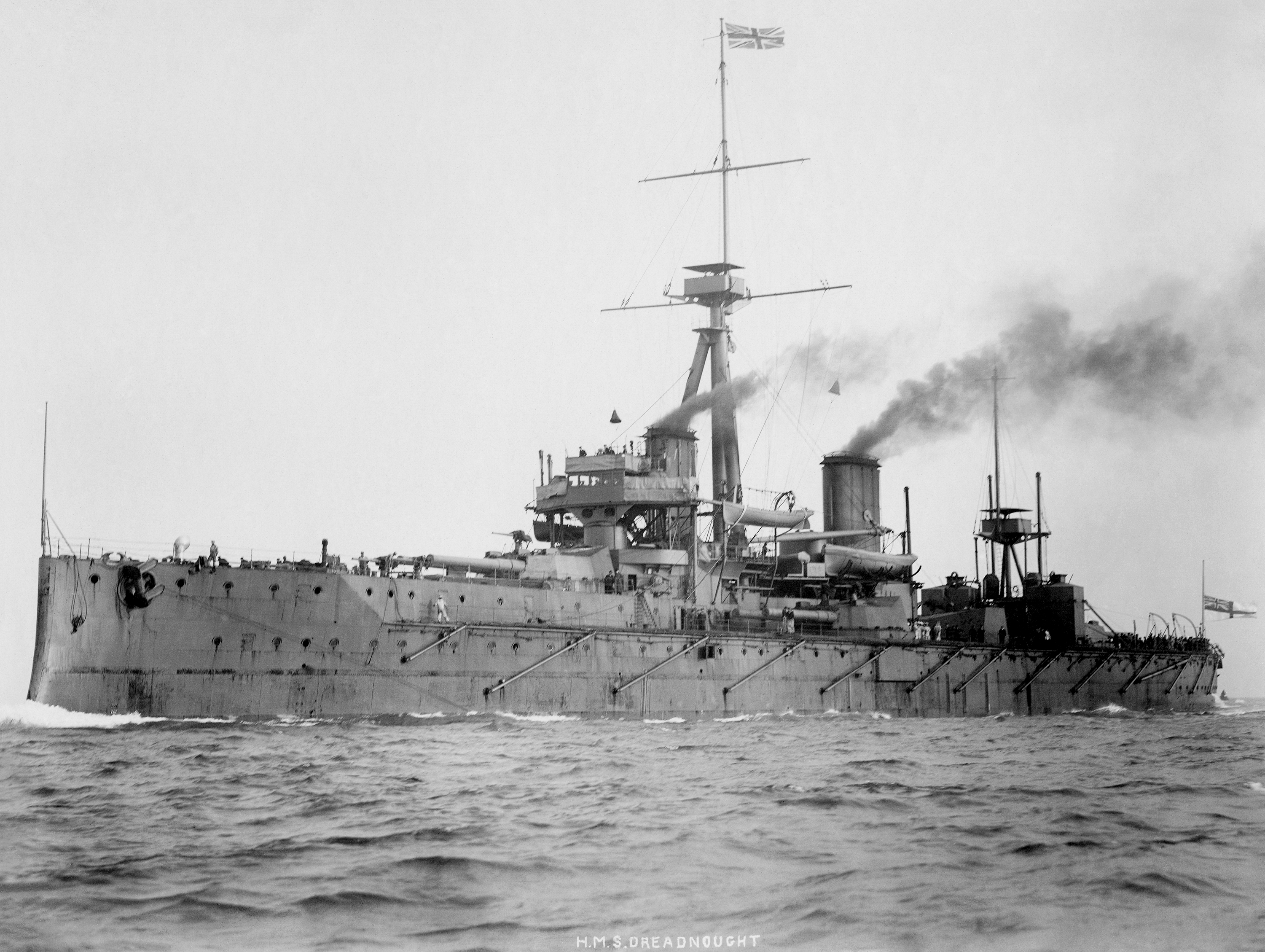
HMS Dreadnought. The 1902, 1904 and 1907 agreements with Japan, France and Russia allowed Britain to refocus resources during the Anglo-German naval arms race

In one explanation of why Britain went to war with Germany, British historian Paul Kennedy (1980) argued that a critical factor was the British realisation that Germany was rapidly becoming economically more powerful than Britain. It was in essence not a consequence of the disputes over economic trade imperialism, the Baghdad Railway, the confrontations in Eastern Europe, highly charged political rhetoric, or domestic pressure groups. Germany's reliance time and again on military aggression, while Britain increasingly appealed to moral sensibilities, also played a role, especially in portraying the invasion of neutral Belgium as (in the German view) a necessary military tactic or (in the British view) a profound moral crime. The German invasion of Belgium was not the real cause of war with Britain, because the British decision had already been made as the British were more concerned with the fate of France (pp. 457–62). Kennedy argues that by far the main reason was London's fear that a repeat of the war of 1870, when Prussia and the German states smashed France, would mean that a rapidly industrialising Germany, with a powerful army and navy, would control the English Channel and northwest France. British policy-makers insisted that that would be a catastrophe for British security. However, the decision to enter the war created severe conflit between the British government. While Britain's commitment to France pushed leadership towards an intervention, four members handed in their resignations in opposition to the war. Cabinet members John Morley and John Burns along with junior minister C.P.Trevelyan, resigned permanently. For other hesitant ministers (such as John Simon and Lord Beauchamp) the violation of Belgium served as justification that persuaded them to withdraw their resignations and unite behind cabinet's declaration for war.

Christopher Clark points out that the British cabinet decided on 29 July 1914, that being a signatory to the 1839 treaty guaranteeing Belgium's frontiers did not oblige it to oppose a German invasion of Belgium with military force.

== Decision for war ==
In the immediate aftermath of the assassination on 28 June of Austrian Archduke Franz Ferdinand (the heir to the Habsburg throne) in the Bosnian capital, Sarajevo, the British newspapers denounced the Serbian nationalist assassin, Gavrilo Princip, and were generally sympathetic to the Austro-Hungarian monarchy. The newspapers blamed the Kingdom of Serbia for the crime, with rhetoric against "fanatics", "dangerous forces" and "reckless agitators". These responses were broadly shared across the political spectrum, with Liberal and Conservative papers expressing their shock and dismay. But by 27 July, press opinion had turned against Austria-Hungary. The national press divided along party lines, with Conservative papers stressing the obligation to support France, while Liberal papers insisted Britain had no such commitment and should remain neutral.

As Germany and Russia became the central players in the crisis (respectively backing Austria-Hungary and Serbia), British leaders increasingly had a sense of commitment to defending France. First, if Germany again conquered France, as had happened in the Franco-Prussian War of 1870, it would become a major threat to British economic, political and cultural interests. Second, partisanship was involved. The Liberal Party was identified with internationalism and free trade, and with opposition to jingoism and warfare. By contrast, the Conservative Party was identified as the party of nationalism and patriotism; Britons expected it "to show capacity in running a war." Liberal voters initially demanded peace, but were outraged when the Germans treated Belgian neutrality as a worthless "scrap of paper" (the words of German Chancellor Theobald von Bethmann Hollweg in ridiculing the Treaty of London). Germany, as part of a massive attack on France, invaded northern France through Belgium early on the morning of 4 August. The Belgians called upon Britain for military assistance under the 1839 treaty, and in response London gave Berlin an ultimatum which expired at 11 pm London time, which was ignored. King George V then declared war on Germany that evening.

Before war was declared, the British newspapers gave the crisis extensive coverage but varied wildly in recommended policy options, basically covering the entire spectrum from peace to war. C. P. Scott and the Manchester Guardian maintained an intense campaign against war. It denounced a "conspiracy to drag us into a war against England's interests", arguing that it would amount to a "crime against Europe", and warning that it would "throw away the accumulated progress of half a century". The politician David Lloyd George told Scott on Tuesday 4 August 1914, "Up until last Sunday only two members of the Cabinet had been in favour of our intervention in the war, but the violation of Belgian territory had completely altered the situation". According to Isabel V. Hull:

Annika Mombauer correctly sums up the current historiography: "Few historians would still maintain that the 'rape of Belgium' was the real motive for Britain's declaration of war on Germany." Instead, the role of Belgian neutrality is variously interpreted as an excuse used to mobilise public opinion, to provide embarrassed radicals in the cabinet with the justification for abandoning the principal of pacifism and thus staying in office, or – in the more conspiratorial versions – as cover for naked imperial interests.

Once war was declared, defence of Belgium rather than France was the public reason given for the war. Propaganda posters emphasised that Britain was required to safeguard Belgium's neutrality under the 1839 Treaty of London.

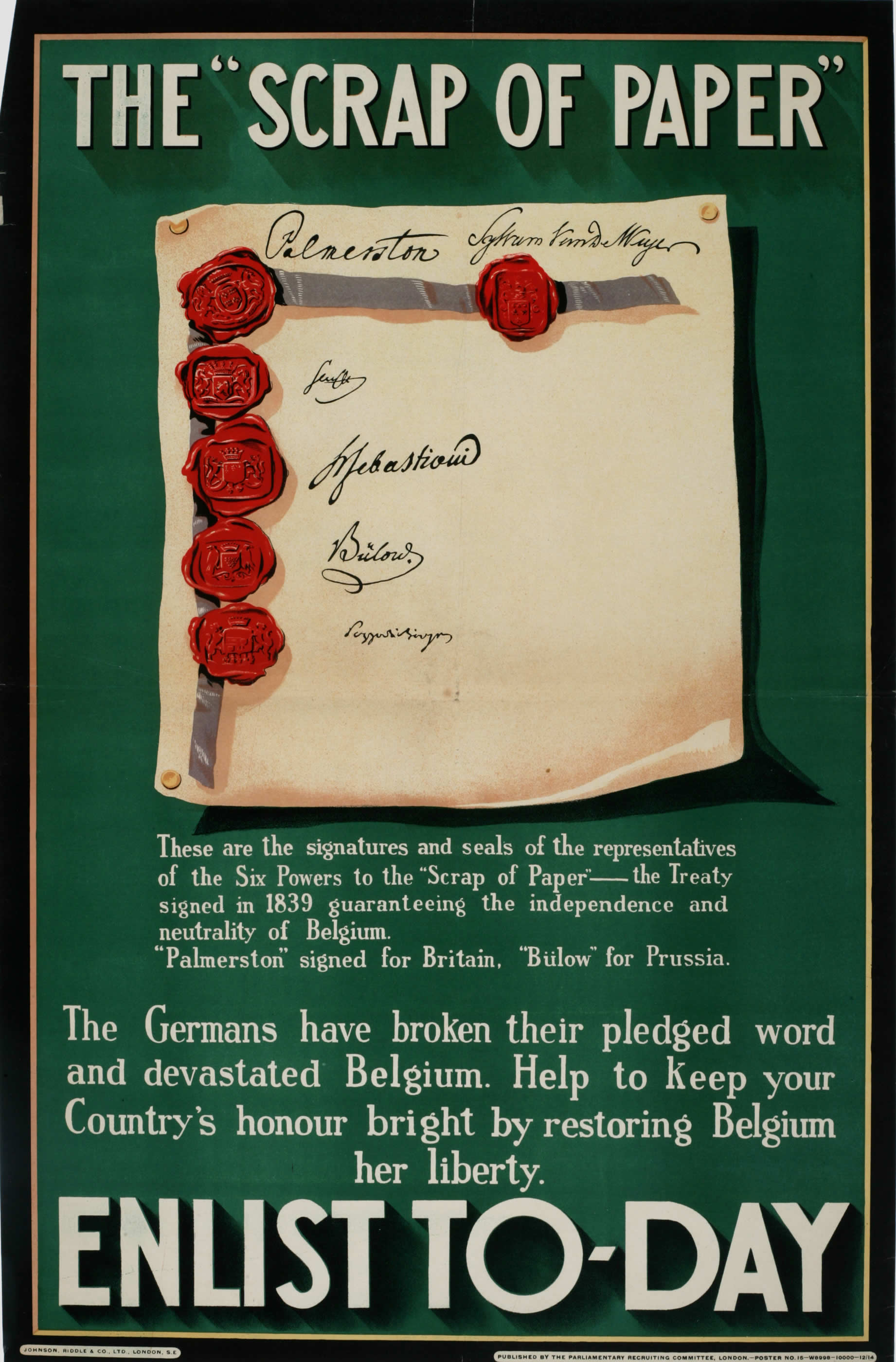
"The Scrap of Paper – Enlist Today", 1914 British propaganda poster emphasizes German contempt for the 1839 treaty (the signature of British Foreign Secretary Lord Palmerston visible at the top), which guaranteed Belgian neutrality, as merely a "scrap of paper" that Germany would ignore.

As late as 1 August 1914, the great majority of Liberals—both voters and cabinet members—strongly opposed going to war. The German invasion of Belgium was such an outrageous violation of international rights that the Liberal Party agreed with the case for war on 4 August. Historian Zara Steiner says:

The public mood did change. Belgium proved to be a catalyst which unleashed the many emotions, rationalizations, and glorifications of war which had long been part of the British climate of opinion. Having a moral cause, all the latent anti-German feelings, fueled by years of naval rivalry and assumed enmity, rose to the surface. The 'scrap of paper' proved decisive both in maintaining the unity of the government and then in providing a focal point for public feeling.

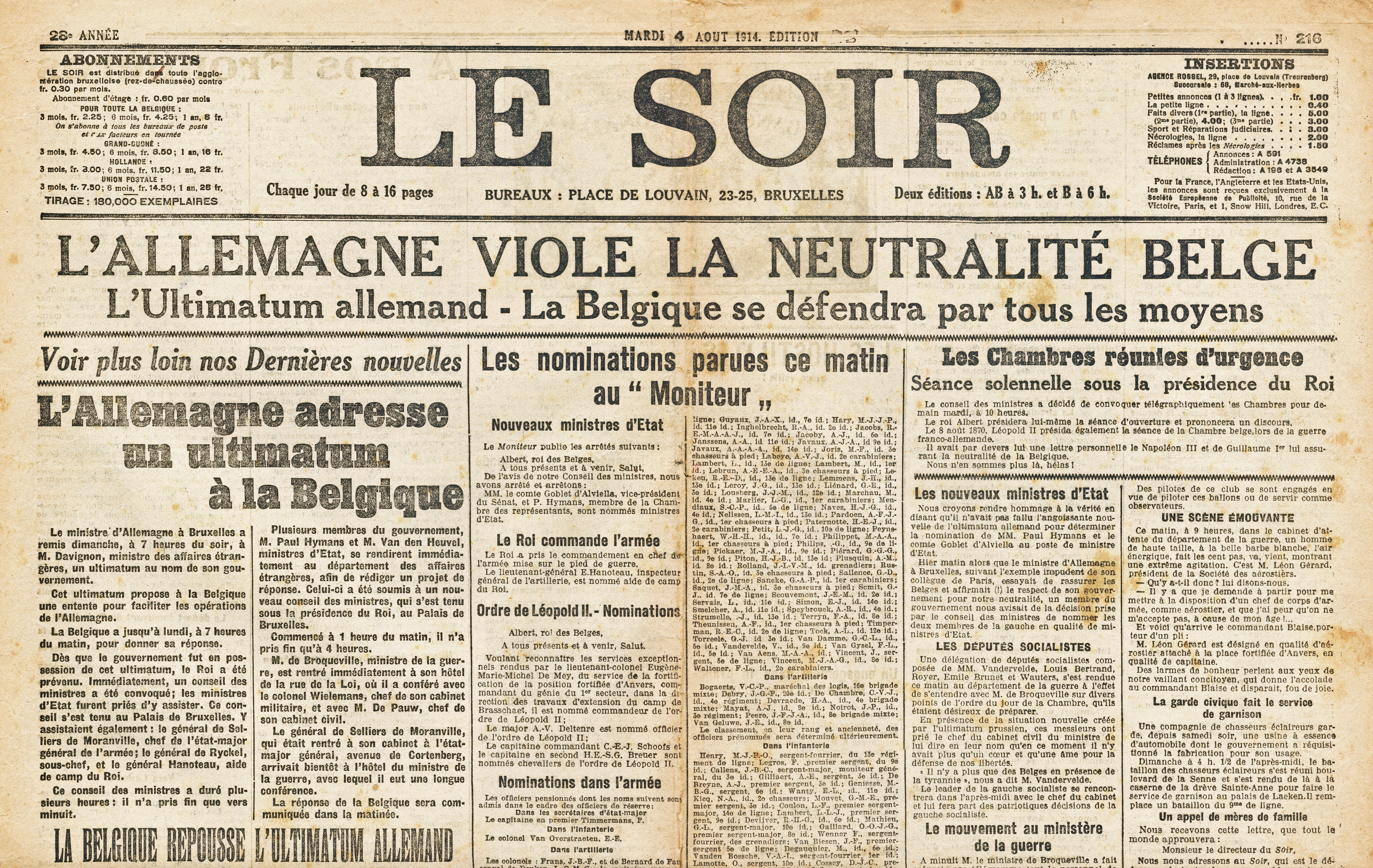
"Germany Violates Belgian Neutrality": Headline in Le Soir, 4 August 1914

The Liberals succeeded in mending their deep divisions over military action. Unless the Liberal government acted decisively against the German invasion of France, its top leaders including Prime Minister H. H. Asquith, Foreign Minister Edward Grey, First Lord of the Admiralty Winston Churchill and others would resign, leading to a risk that the much more pro-war Conservative Party might form a government. Mistreatment of Belgium was not itself a fundamental cause of British entry into the war, but it was used extensively as a justification in wartime propaganda to motivate the British people.

Historian John W. Young argues that Winston Churchill intentionally minimized his behind-the-scenes negoations with the Unionist leaders in his 1923 memoir "The World Crisis". While Churchill showed F.E.Smith's July 31st letter opting for Opposition support, he hid his own efforts to create a Liberal-Unionist coalition to replace anti-war cabinet members. Churchill also hid important meetings, for example, his memoirs claimed to have dined alone at the Admiralty on August 1, 1914, instead he hosted Unionist Leader Andrew Bonar Law. Young claims this selective presentation was intended to hide how close Asquith's Liberal Admisistration has come to breaking up during the decision for war.

While historians such as Paul Kennedy and E. McCullough argue that Britain's underlying motivation for entering the war was strategic (based on the fear that a German victory over France would leave Germany in control of the English Channel and Northwest France), the German invasion of Belgium served as the final decisive trigger and overt cause.

Before the invasion, the British Cabinet was deeply divided over intervening on behalf of France, having concluded in July that the 1839 Treaty of London was more of a matter of policy than a strict obligation to fight. The push toward intervention initially fractured the government, causing four Cabinet ministersand a junior minister to resign. To prevent the collapse of the Cabinet, moderate ministers led by Herbert Samuel created a comprimise in August that made the violation of Belgian neutrality the trigger for the British military intervention.

The German high command was aware that entering Belgium could trigger British intervention but decided the risk was acceptable; they expected it to be a short war, and their ambassador in London claimed civil war in Ireland would prevent Britain from assisting France.

Historians looking at the July Crisis typically conclude that Grey:

was not a great Foreign Secretary but an honest, reticent, punctilious English gentleman... He exhibited a judicious understanding of European affairs, a firm control of his staff, and a suppleness and tact in diplomacy, but he had no boldness, no imagination, no ability to command men and events. [Regarding the war] He pursued a cautious, moderate policy, one that not only fitted his temperament, but also reflected the deep split in the Cabinet, in the Liberal party, and in public opinion.

The majority of the Labour Party, which as a member of the Second International had opposed the war, also shifted to support after the German invasion of Belgium with the exception of some members such as its secretary Ramsay MacDonald. The rest of the Labour Party leadership under Arthur Henderson calculated that the war would be brief and that opposing it would cost the party at the next general election.

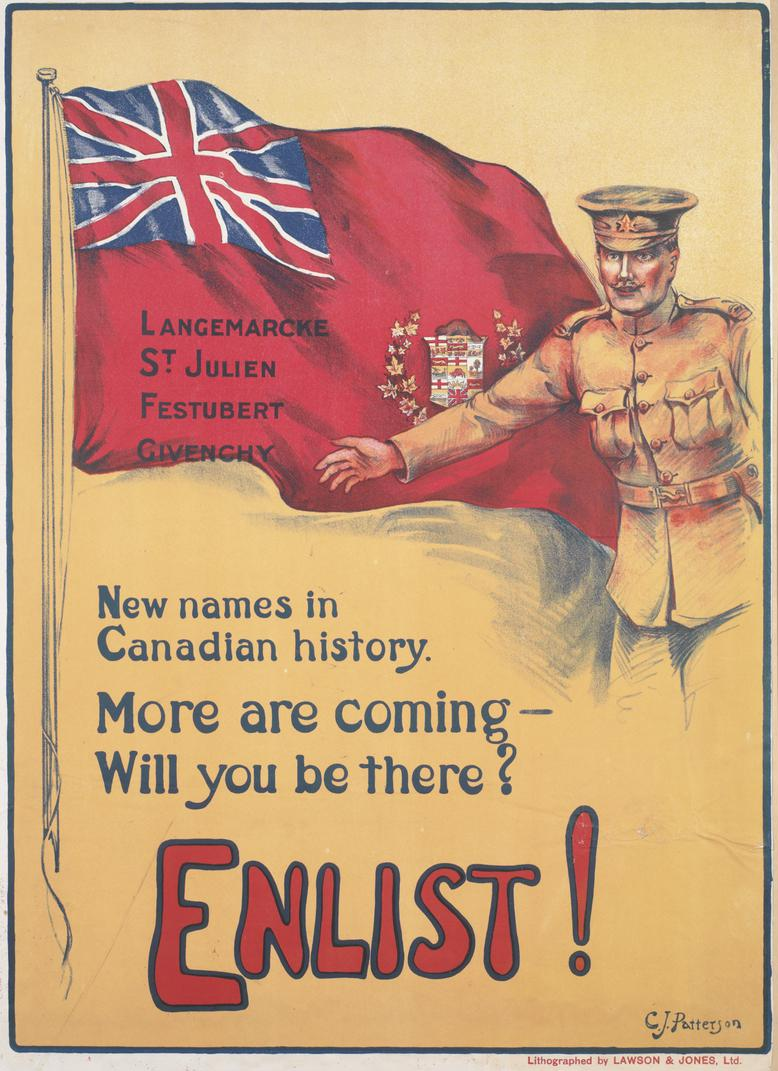
Canada automatically joined the war, and vigorously recruited volunteers.

== Irish crisis on hold ==
Until late July, British politics was focused on the threat of a possible civil war in Ireland. In 1912 the government had presented an Irish Home Rule bill that Irish nationalists demanded; under the terms of the Parliament Act 1911, by which the House of Lords retained the right to delay legislation by up to two years, it was due to become law in 1914. The Ulster Protestants demanded separate treatment; by mid-1914 the government was offering a six-year opt-out to the six counties which would eventually become Northern Ireland, but not the permanent exemption which they demanded. Both sides in Ireland had smuggled in weapons, set up militias with tens of thousands of volunteers, were drilling, and were ready to fight a civil war. The British Army itself was paralyzed: during the Curragh Incident officers threatened to resign or accept dismissal rather than obey orders to deploy into Ulster. Elements of the Conservative and Unionist Party supported them.

On 25 July the Austrian ultimatum to Serbia became known, and the cabinet realized that war with Germany was increasingly likely. The Government of Ireland Act 1914 was enacted into law, but was suspended for the duration of hostilities, with the issue of Ulster still unresolved. Grey told the British Parliament on 3 August, "The one bright spot in the whole of this terrible situation is Ireland. [Prolonged cheers.] The general feeling throughout Ireland, and I would like this to be clearly understood abroad, does not make that a consideration that we feel we have to take into account. [Cheers.]"

== Empire at war ==
The king's declaration of war automatically involved all dominions, colonies, and protectorates of the British Empire, many of whom made significant contributions to the Allied war effort, both in the provision of troops and civilian labourers.

== Commemoration ==
The Catholic Bishops of England and Wales invited Catholic churches to conduct a Requiem Mass for the dead on or around Monday 4 August 2015, and on five subsequent anniversaries, to mark the centenary of the entry of the British Empire into the War.

== See also ==
- Allies of World War I
  - France–United Kingdom relations
  - Germany–United Kingdom relations
  - Triple Entente
- Causes of World War I
  - Austro-Hungarian entry into World War I
  - French entry into World War I
  - German entry into World War I
  - Ottoman entry into World War I
  - Russian entry into World War I
- Color book
- Diplomatic history of World War I
- History of the foreign relations of the United Kingdom
- History of the United Kingdom, since 1707
- International relations (1814–1919)
- International relations (1919–1939)
- Military history of the United Kingdom
- Timeline of British diplomatic history

== Historiography ==
- Cornelissen, Christoph, and Arndt Weinrich, eds. Writing the Great War - The Historiography of World War I from 1918 to the Present (2020) free download; full coverage for major countries.
- Herwig, Holger H. ed., The Outbreak of World War I: Causes and Responsibilities (1990) excerpts from primary and secondary sources
- Horne, John, ed. A Companion to World War I (2012) 38 topics essays by scholars
- Kramer, Alan. "Recent Historiography of the First World War – Part I", Journal of Modern European History (Feb. 2014) 12#1 pp 5–27; "Recent Historiography of the First World War (Part II)", (May 2014) 12#2 pp 155–174.
- Langdon, John W. "Emerging from Fischer's shadow: recent examinations of the crisis of July 1914." History Teacher 20.1 (1986): 63–86, historiography in JSTOR
- Mombauer, Annika. "Guilt or Responsibility? The Hundred-Year Debate on the Origins of World War I." Central European History 48.4 (2015): 541–564.
- Mulligan, William. "The Trial Continues: New Directions in the Study of the Origins of the First World War." English Historical Review (2014) 129#538 pp: 639–666.
- Winter, Jay. and Antoine Prost eds. The Great War in History: Debates and Controversies, 1914 to the Present (2005)

== Primary sources ==
- Barker. Ernest, et al. eds. Why we are at war; Great Britain's case (3rd ed. 1914), the official British case against Germany. online
- Gooch, G.P. Recent revelations of European diplomacy (1928) pp 3-101. online
- Major 1914 documents from BYU
- Gooch, G.P. and Harold Temperley, eds. British documents on the origins of the war, 1898-1914 (11 vol.) online
  - v. i The end of British isolation —v.2. The Anglo-Japanese Alliance and the Franco-British Entente —v.3. The testing of the Entente, 1904-6 -- v.4. The Anglo-Russian rapprochment, 1903-7 -- v.5. The Near East, 1903-9 -- v.6. Anglo-German tension. Armaments and negotiation, 1907-12—v.7. The Agadir crisis—v.8. Arbitration, neutrality and security —v.9. The Balkan wars, pt.1-2 -- v.10, pt.1. The Near and Middle East on the eve of war. pt.2. The last years of peace—v.11. The outbreak of war V.3. The testing of the Entente, 1904-6 -- v.4. The Anglo-Russian rapprochment, 1903-7 -- v.5. The Near East, 1903-9 -- v.6. Anglo-German tension. Armaments and negotiation, 1907-12—v.7. The Agadir crisis—v.8. Arbitration, neutrality and security—v.9. The Balkan wars, pt.1-2 -- v.10, pt.1. The Near and Middle East on the eve of war. pt.2. The last years of peace—v.11. The outbreak of war.
- Joll, James, ed. Britain and Europe 1793-1940 (1967); 390pp of documents; online
- Jones, Edgar Rees, ed. Selected speeches on British foreign policy, 1738-1914 (1914). online free
- Lowe, C.J. and Michael L. Dockrill, eds. Mirage of Power: The Documents v. 3: British Foreign Policy (1972); vol 3 = primary sources 1902–1922
- Scott, James Brown, ed., Diplomatic Documents Relating To The Outbreak Of The European War (1916) online
- United States. War Dept. General Staff. Strength and organization of the armies of France, Germany, Austria, Russia, England, Italy, Mexico and Japan (showing conditions in July, 1914) (1916) online
- Wilson, K.M. "The British Cabinet's Decision for War, 2 August 1914" British Journal of International Studies 1#3 (1975), pp. 148–159 online
- Young, John W. "Lewis Harcourt's Journal of the 1914 War Crisis." International History Review 40.2 (2018): 436–455. Diary of UK cabinet discussions 26 July to 4 August 1914.
