= Russian entry into World War I =

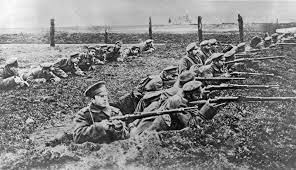
Russian troops in the trenches at the Russian invasion of East Prussia.

European diplomatic alignments shortly before the war.

The Russian Empire's entry into World War I unfolded gradually in the days leading up to July 28, 1914. The sequence of events began with Austria-Hungary's declaration of war on Serbia, a Russian ally. In response, Russia issued an ultimatum to Vienna via Saint Petersburg, warning Austria-Hungary against attacking Serbia. As the conflict escalated with the invasion of Serbia, Russia commenced mobilizing its reserve army along the border of Austria-Hungary. Consequently, on July 31, Germany demanded that Russia demobilize. When Russia did not comply, Germany declared war on Russia on August 1, 1914. According to its war plan, Germany prioritized its offensive against France, declaring war on August 3. Germany deployed its main armies through Belgium with the aim of encircling Paris. The imminent threat to Belgium prompted Britain to declare war on Germany on August 4. The Ottoman Empire subsequently joined the Central Powers by conducting the Black Sea Raid and engaged in warfare against Russia along their shared border at the Caucasus.

Historians studying the causes of World War I have often highlighted the roles of Germany and Austria-Hungary, while downplaying Russia's contribution to the outbreak of this global conflict. The prevailing scholarly view has focused on Russia's defense of Orthodox Serbia, its pan-Slavic aspirations, its treaty commitments with France, and its efforts to maintain its status as a major world power. However, historian Sean McMeekin emphasizes Russia's ambitions to expand its empire southward and to capture Constantinople (modern-day Istanbul) as a gateway to the Mediterranean Sea.

Archduke Franz Ferdinand, the heir to the Austria-Hungarian throne, was assassinated by Bosnian Serbs on June 28, 1914, in response to Austria-Hungary's annexation of the predominantly Slavic province. Although Austria-Hungary could not conclusively prove that the Serbian state had sponsored the assassination, it issued an ultimatum to Serbia during the July Crisis one month later, expecting it to be rejected and thus leading to war. Austria-Hungary considered Serbia deserving of punishment for the assassination of Archduke Franz Ferdinand.

While Russia had no formal treaty obligation to Serbia, it emphasized its interest in controlling the Balkans, viewing it as a long-term strategic goal to gain a military advantage over Germany and Austria-Hungary. Russia was initially inclined to delay militarization, and most Russian leaders sought to avoid war. However, Russia had secured French support and feared that a failure to defend Serbia would damage its credibility, constituting a significant political setback in its Balkan ambitions. Tsar Nicholas II ordered the mobilization of Russian forces on July 30, 1914, to deter Austria-Hungary from invading Serbia. Historian Christopher Clark views the "Russian general mobilization [of July 30] as one of the most critical decisions of the July Crisis." The first general mobilization occurred before the German government declared a state of imminent war.

Russia's warnings to Germany led to military action by German forces, which carried out their mobilization and declared war on August 1, 1914. At the start of the conflict, Russian forces launched offensives against Germany and Austria-Hungary.

== Background ==
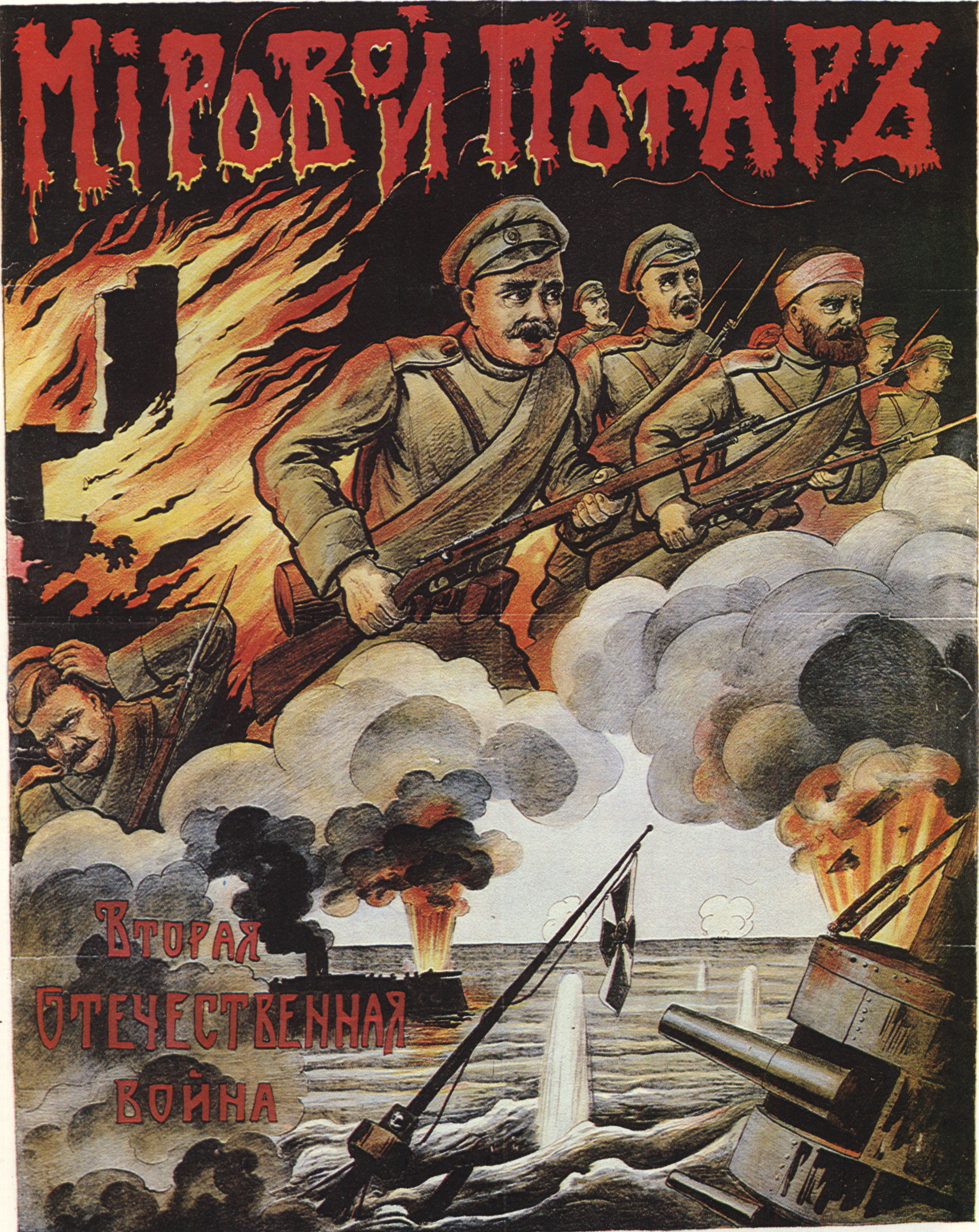
A Russian recruiting poster. Caption reads: "World on Fire; Second Patriotic War."

Between 1873 and 1887, Russia was allied with Germany and Austria-Hungary in the League of the Three Emperors, and later with Germany in the 1887–1890 Reinsurance Treaty. Both alliances collapsed due to the conflicting interests of Austria-Hungary and Russia in the Balkans. France capitalized on this situation by forming the 1894 Franco-Russian Alliance, while Britain viewed Russia with suspicion because of the Great Game. In 1800, there was over 3,000 kilometers (1,900 mi) separating Russia and British India, but by 1902, this distance had decreased to 30 kilometers (19 mi) due to Russian advances into Central Asia. The proximity raised the risk of conflict between the two powers, compounded by Russia's longstanding goal of gaining control of the Bosporus Straits, which would provide access to the Mediterranean Sea dominated by Britain.

Britain's isolation during the 1899–1902 Second Boer War and Russia's defeat in the 1905 Russo-Japanese War prompted both countries to seek allies. The Anglo-Russian Convention of 1907 resolved disputes in Asia and paved the way for the establishment of the Triple Entente with France, although this alliance was largely informal. In 1908, Austria-Hungary annexed the former Ottoman province of Bosnia and Herzegovina, leading to the Russian-backed formation of the Balkan League aimed at preventing further Austrian expansion.

During the 1912–1913 First Balkan War, Serbia, Bulgaria, and Greece seized most of the remaining Ottoman territories in Europe. Disagreements over their partition led to the Second Balkan War, where Bulgaria suffered a decisive defeat at the hands of its former allies. This defeat transformed Bulgaria into a resentful regional power, setting the stage for renewed attempts to achieve its national goals. As a result, Serbia emerged as the primary Russian ally in the region.

Russia's industrial base and railway network had significantly improved since 1905, albeit from a relatively low starting point. In 1913, Nicholas II expanded the Russian army to over 500,000 men. Although there was no formal alliance between Russia and Serbia, their close bilateral ties provided Russia with a pathway into the weakening Ottoman Empire, where Germany also had significant interests. Coupled with the increase in Russian military capabilities, Austria-Hungary and Germany perceived Serbia's expansion as a threat. When Austria-Hungary invaded Serbia on July 28, 1914, Russian Foreign Minister Sergei Sazonov interpreted it as part of an Austro-German plot to diminish Russian influence in the Balkans.

On July 30, Russia announced a general mobilization in support of Serbia. The following day, on August 1, 1914, Germany declared war on Russia, followed by Austria-Hungary on August 6. Russia and the Entente declared war on the Ottoman Empire in November 1914, prompted by Ottoman warships bombarding the Black Sea port of Odessa in late October in the Black Sea Raid.

== Major players ==
Many historians agree that Russia's top military leadership was generally regarded as incompetent. Tsar Nicholas II made all final decisions but often received conflicting advice from his advisors, leading to flawed decision-making throughout his reign. He established an organizational structure that proved inadequate for the high pressures and immediate demands of wartime. British historian David Stevenson, for instance, highlights the "disastrous consequences of deficient civil-military liaison," where civilians and generals lacked communication. The government was unaware of its fatal weaknesses and remained disconnected from public opinion. The Foreign Minister had to warn Nicholas that "unless he yielded to the popular demand and took up arms in support of Serbia, he would risk facing revolution and losing his throne." Nicholas yielded but ultimately lost his throne. Stevenson concludes:

Russian decision-making in July 1914 was more truly a tragedy of miscalculation... a policy of deterrence that failed to deter. Yet, like Germany, it too rested on the assumption that war was possible without domestic breakdown and that it could be waged with a reasonable prospect of success. Russia was more vulnerable to social upheaval than any other power. Its socialists were more estranged from the existing order than those elsewhere in Europe, and a strike wave among the industrial workforce reached a crescendo with the general stoppage in St. Petersburg in July 1914.

French ambassador Maurice Paléologue quickly gained influence by repeatedly pledging that France would go to war alongside Russia, aligning with President Raymond Poincaré's position.

Serious planning for a future war was practically unattainable due to the intricate rivalries and preferences afforded to royalty. The primary criteria for high command were ties to royalty rather than expertise. While the General Staff possessed expertise, it was often overshadowed by the elite Imperial Guards, a favored stronghold of the aristocracy that prioritized ceremonial parades over strategic military planning. Consequently, the grand dukes inevitably ascended to high command positions.

== French alliance ==
Russia relied heavily on the French alliance, as Germany would face greater challenges in a two-front war compared to a conflict with Russia alone. French ambassador Maurice Paléologue showed deep antipathy toward Germany and believed that when war broke out, France and Russia had to be staunch allies against Germany. His stance aligned with that of French President Raymond Poincaré. France pledged unconditional support to Russia in the unfolding crisis with Germany and Austria-Hungary. Historians debate whether Paléologue exceeded his instructions, but there is consensus that he failed to provide Paris with precise information, neglecting to warn that Russian mobilization could precipitate a world war.

== Beginning of the war ==
On June 28, 1914, Archduke Franz Ferdinand of Austria was assassinated in Sarajevo, triggering a period of indecision for Tsar Nicholas II regarding Russia's course of action. A relatively new factor influencing Russian policy was the rise of Pan-Slavism, which emphasized Russia's responsibility to all Slavs, particularly those threatened by Austria-Hungary. This shift in focus redirected attention from the Ottoman Empire to the perceived threat posed by Austria-Hungary against Slavic peoples. Serbia positioned itself as the champion of the Pan-Slavic ideal, while Austria-Hungary aimed to crush Serbia for this reason. Nicholas was inclined to defend Serbia but was reluctant to engage in war with Germany. In a series of letters exchanged with Kaiser Wilhelm of Germany (the so-called "Willy–Nicky correspondence"), both cousins expressed their desire for peace and attempted to persuade the other to relent. Nicholas sought to limit Russia's mobilization to confront only Austria-Hungary in order to avoid a conflict with Germany. However, the Kaiser had pledged to support Austria-Hungary.

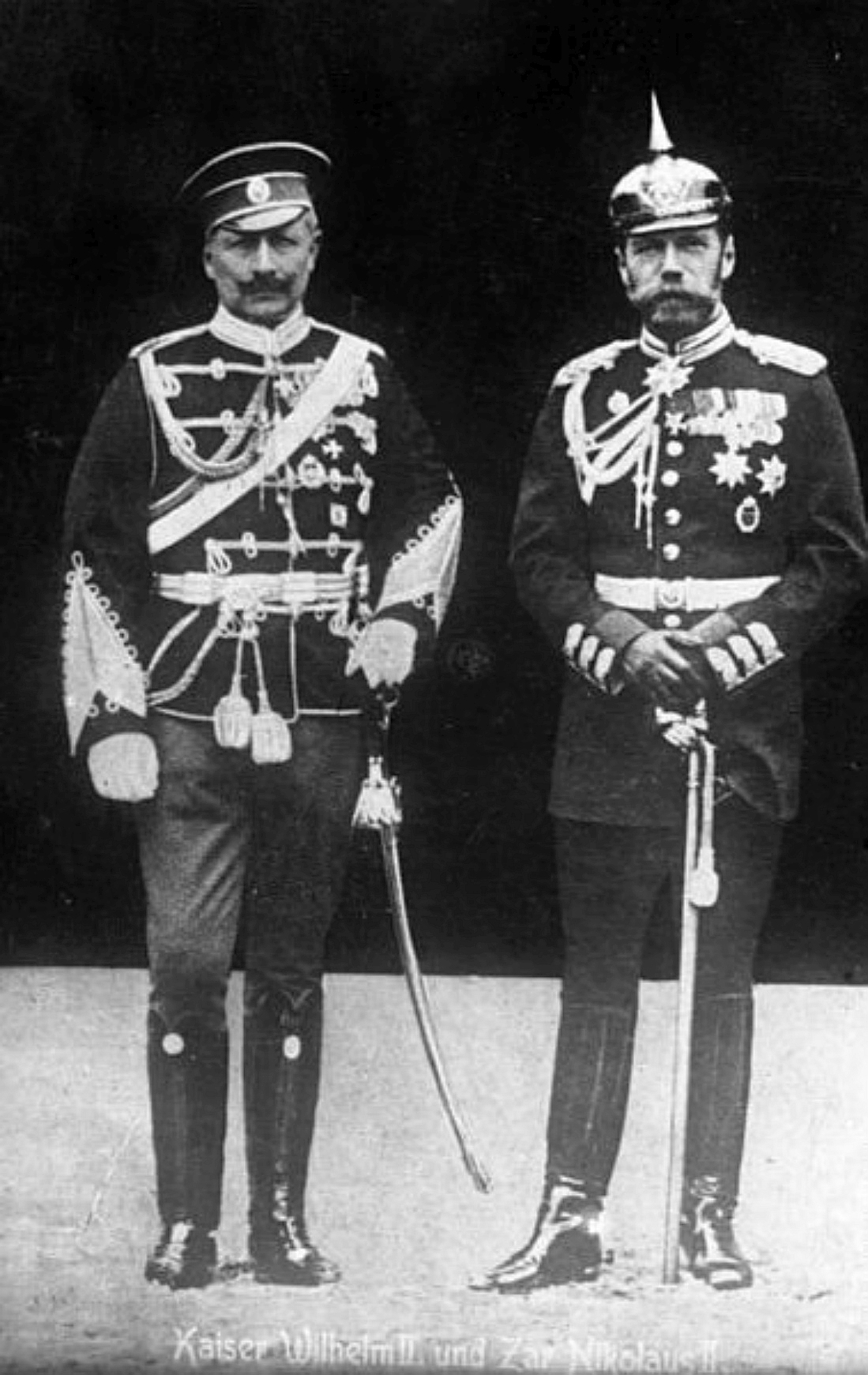
Nicky (Tsar Nicholas II) (right) with Willy (Kaiser Wilhelm) in 1905. Nicholas is wearing a German Army uniform, and Wilhelm is wearing that of a Russian hussar regiment.

On July 25, 1914, Nicholas decided to intervene in the Austro-Serbian conflict, a move that escalated the situation towards a general war. He placed the Russian army on "alert" on July 25, although it was not a full-scale mobilization. This action raised concerns along the German and Austro-Hungarian borders, appearing as military preparations for war. However, the Russian Army had few viable plans and no contingency plans for a partial mobilization. On July 30, 1914, Nicholas took the momentous step of confirming the order for a general mobilization, despite his strong reluctance.

On July 28, Austria-Hungary officially declared war on Serbia. Count Witte conveyed to the French Ambassador Maurice Palaeologus that the Russian perspective viewed the war as madness, dismissed Slavic solidarity as mere nonsense, and saw no potential benefits from engaging in war.

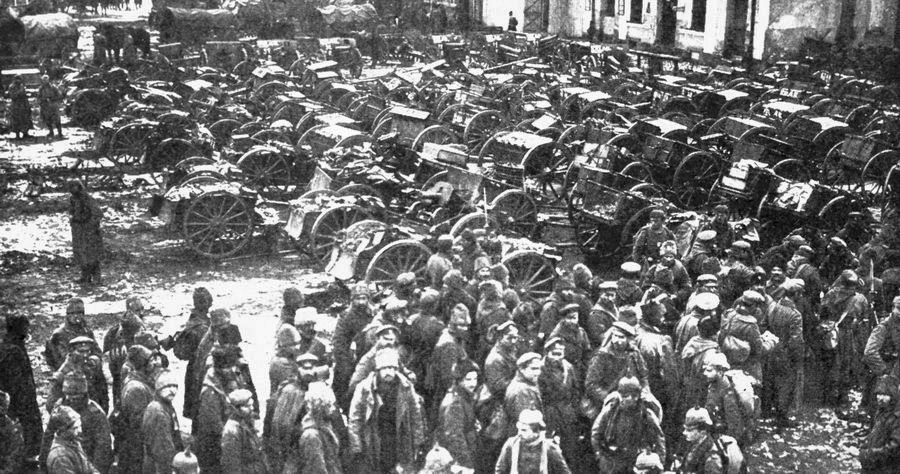
Russian prisoners at the Battle of Tannenberg where German forces annihilated the Russian Second Army.

On July 30, Russia ordered a general mobilization but stated that it would not initiate an attack if peace negotiations commenced. In response to the discovery of Russian partial mobilization, which had been ordered on July 25, Germany announced a state of pre-mobilization, citing the imminent threat of war. Germany demanded that Russia demobilize within twelve hours. When the German ultimatum to Russia expired at 7 p.m. in St. Petersburg, the German ambassador to Russia met with Russian Foreign Minister Sergei Sazonov. Despite being asked three times if Russia would reconsider, the ambassador delivered a note accepting Russia's challenge to war, leading to Germany declaring war on Russia on August 1. On August 6, Franz Joseph I of Austria signed the Austro-Hungarian declaration of war against Russia.

At the onset of the war, each European power started releasing curated, and at times misleading, collections of diplomatic correspondence. These publications aimed to justify their own entry into the war while attributing blame to other parties. The first of these compilations was the German White Book, released on August 4, 1914, the same day as Britain's declaration of war. The British Blue Book was published two days later, followed by the Russian Orange Book in mid-August.

== Military weaknesses ==
The outbreak of war on August 1, 1914, caught Russia severely unprepared. The Allies relied heavily on the Russian army, which had a pre-war regular strength of 1,400,000 and added 3,100,000 reserves through mobilization. However, Russia was ill-equipped in other aspects for the war effort. Germany had ten times as much railway track per square kilometer, resulting in Russian soldiers traveling an average of 1,290 kilometers (800 mi) to reach the front, while German soldiers traveled less than a quarter of that distance. Russia's heavy industry was insufficient to equip the massive armies that the Tsar's government could mobilize, and its munitions reserves were limited. While the Imperial German Army in 1914 was better equipped than any other land force on a per-person basis, the Russian army lacked sufficient artillery pieces, shells, motorized transports, and boots.

Before the war, Russian planners overlooked the critical logistical challenge of how the Allies could transport supplies and munitions to Russia. With the Baltic Sea blocked by German U-boats and surface ships, and the Bosphorus and Dardanelles obstructed by the guns and mines of Germany's ally, the Ottoman Empire, Russia initially could only receive assistance through the ports of Arkhangelsk (which was frozen solid in winter) or of Vladivostok, over 6,400 kilometers (4,000 mi) from the front line. In 1915, construction of a new rail-line began, eventually providing access to the ice-free port of Murmansk by 1917.

Illustration of the second Siege of Przemyśl of 1914-1915, from the Illustrated War News.

The Russian High Command suffered from internal strife due to the mutual animosity between War Minister Vladimir Sukhomlinov and Grand Duke Nicholas, who commanded the armies in the field. Despite this, the Imperial Russian Army launched an immediate attack against the German province of East Prussia on 17 August 1914. The Germans swiftly mobilized and defeated the two invading Russian armies. The Battle of Tannenberg of August 1914, in which the entire Russian Second Army was annihilated, cast a dark shadow over the Russian Empire's future. The loyal officers who perished were precisely those needed to safeguard the dynasty. While the Russian armies achieved some success against both the Austro-Hungarian and Ottoman forces, they faced steady retreats in the face of the German Army. In September 1914, to alleviate pressure on France, the Russians were compelled to halt a successful offensive against Austria-Hungary in Galicia and instead to attack German-held Silesia.

The primary Russian diplomatic objectives focused on the Balkans, and Saint Petersburg had a particularly long-standing dream of capturing Constantinople (Istanbul). The Ottoman Empire's entry into the war, marked by its attack on Russia's Black Sea coast on 29 October 1914, presented new opportunities, but Russia was too strained to capitalize on them. On 3 November British warships bombarded the outer forts of the Dardanelles Straits — the beginning of the ill-fated Gallipoli campaign. The combination of inadequate preparation and planning undermined the morale of Russian troops and laid the groundwork for the Tsarist régime's collapse in early 1917.

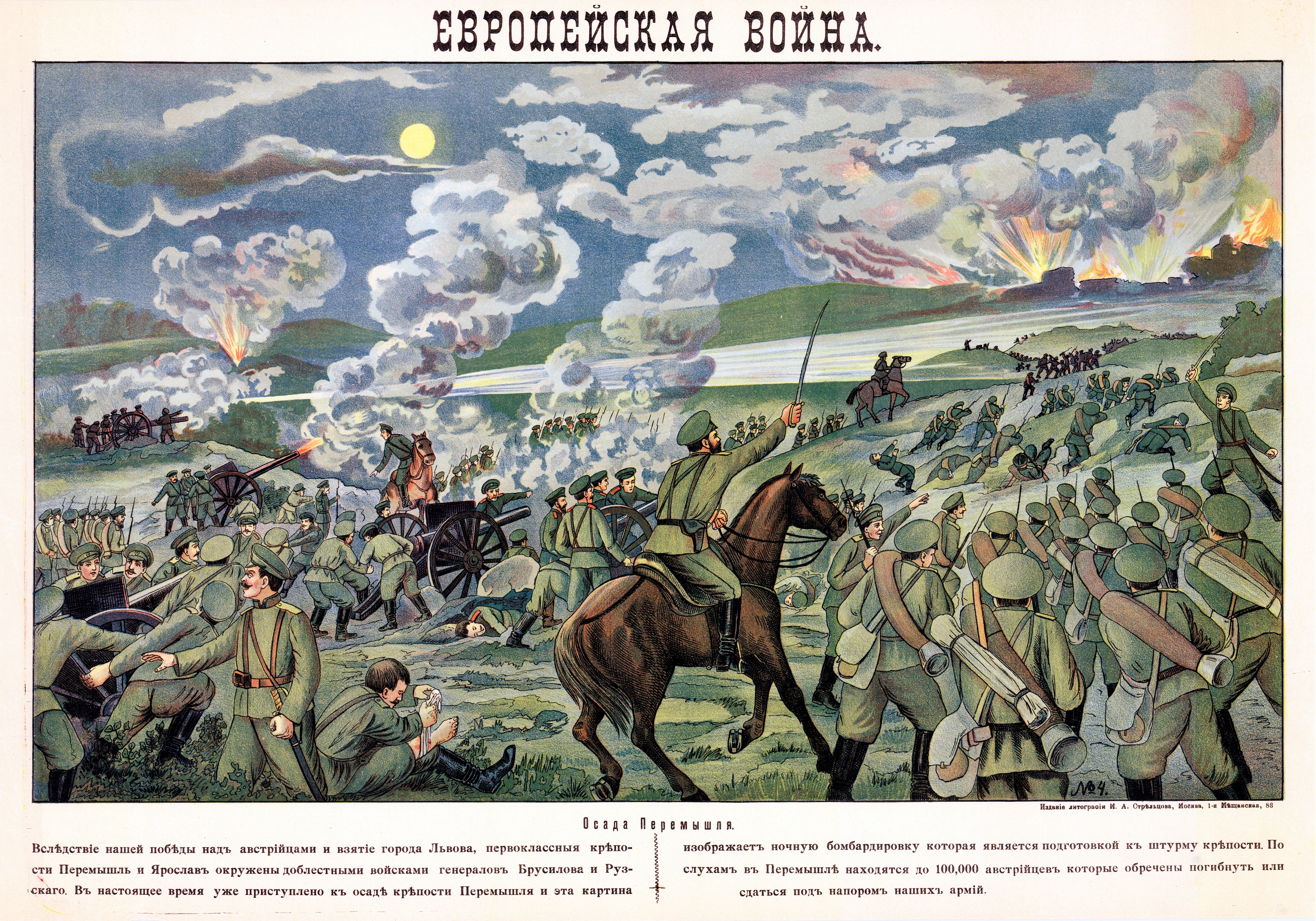
Russian war poster 1915

Gradually, a war of attrition took hold on the extensive Eastern Front, with the Russians confronting the combined forces of Germany and Austria-Hungary, leading to staggering losses. General Anton Denikin, retreating from Galicia, wrote:

The German heavy artillery swept away whole lines of trenches and their defenders with them. We hardly replied. There was nothing with which we could reply. Our regiments, although completely exhausted, were beating off one attack after another by bayonet... Blood flowed unendingly, the ranks became thinner and thinner and thinner. The number of graves multiplied.

== Legacy ==
Historians examining the origins of the First World War have primarily focused on the roles of Germany and Austria-Hungary. The scholarly consensus minimizes the mention of Russia, with only brief references to its defense of Serbia, its Pan-Slavic activities, its treaty commitments with France, and its efforts to maintain its status as a major power.

However, historian Sean McMeekin has emphasized Russia's aggressive expansionist aspirations to the south. He contends that for Russia, the war was primarily about the Ottoman Empire, asserting that the Foreign Ministry and Army had been planning a war of aggression since at least 1908, and possibly as early as 1895. McMeekin highlights that the immediate objective was to capture Constantinople and control the Dardanelles and Bosporus straits to gain access to the Mediterranean. Reviewers have generally been critical of McMeekin's revisionist interpretation.

== See also ==
- Foreign policy of the Russian Empire
- Allies of World War I
  - Triple Entente
- Causes of World War I
- July Crisis
- Diplomatic history of World War I
  - Austro-Hungarian entry into World War I
  - British entry into World War I
  - French entry into World War I
  - German entry into World War I
  - Ottoman entry into World War I
- Historiography of the causes of World War I
- International relations of the Great Powers (1814–1919)
