= Color book =

Governmental publication of diplomatic and political content

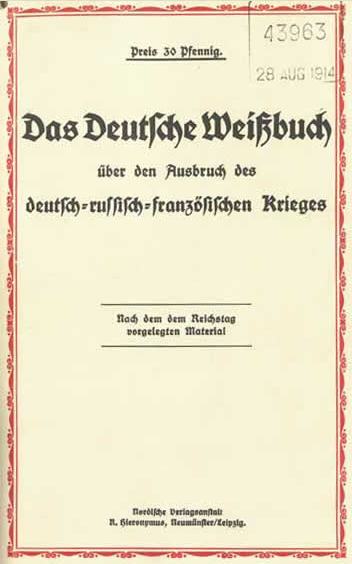
The German White Book dealing with World War I

In diplomatic history, a color book is an officially sanctioned collection of diplomatic correspondence and other documents published by a government for educational or political reasons, or to promote the government position on current or past events. The earliest were the British Blue Books, dating to the 17th century. In World War I, all the major powers had their own color book, such as the German White Book, the Austrian Red Book, Russian Orange Book, and more.

Especially in wartime or times of crisis, color books have been used as a form of white propaganda to justify governmental action, or to assign blame to foreign actors. The choice of what documents to include, how to present them, and even what order to list them, can make the book tantamount to government-issued propaganda.

== Terminology ==
The terms for individual color books such as the British blue book go back centuries and other individual color books were common in the 19th century and especially during World War I. The collective term color book appears less frequently, and later. In German, "Rainbow book" ("Regenbogenbuch") is seen in 1915, and "color book" ("Farbbuch") in 1928. In English, attestations of both rainbow book and color book go back to at least 1915.

== History ==
=== Origin and early history ===
In the early 17th century, blue books first came into use in England as a means of publishing diplomatic correspondence and reports. They were so named, because of their blue cover. The Oxford English Dictionary first records such a usage in 1633.

During the time of the Napoleonic Wars in the early 19th century, they were being published regularly. By the second half of the century, Turkey began publishing its own version in red, and the concept of color books spread to other countries in Europe, with each country using one color: Germany using white; France: yellow; red: Austria-Hungary (Spain also used red later, as did the Soviet Union); Belgium: gray; Italy: green; and Netherlands (and Tsarist Russia): orange. This concept spread to the Americas as well, with the United States using red, Mexico: orange, and various countries in Central and South America using other colors; it even spread as far as China (yellow) and Japan (gray).

The choice of colors was arbitrary at first, but became consistent among the great powers under the Vienna System.

=== Nineteenth century ===
The 19th century was a period of great development and activity for Blue Books which were published in large numbers in Great Britain under numerous foreign secretaries. In theory, their purpose was to give Parliament the info it needed (and sometimes demanded) to provide a basis for judgment on foreign affairs.

==== Causation and production ====
In the UK, color books were initially created through one of three paths: by command of the Crown, by order of the House, or in response to an address in the House of Commons or Lords. Pressure was sometimes brought to bear, and papers might be published, which otherwise might not have been. Blue Books were bound and published since the days of Foreign Secretary George Canning. Bound Blue Book sets of the House of Commons are readily available; Lords less so.

Documents were often printed on large sheets of white paper, loosely bound, called White Papers, and were presented to the House of Commons or Lords, often unbound and undated. This lack of date would sometimes become problematic later for historians attempting to follow the historical record, and depended on further research to sort it out. Some of the documents were reprinted and bound and known as "Blue Books" after the color of the covers.

As parliamentary systems became more entrenched in Europe, color books emerged as a means of justifying policy.

==== Influence of Foreign Secretaries ====
No other European state rivaled Great Britain in the number of color book publications. Originally conceived of as a way to "meet the ebb and flow of public opinion", they were handled differently during different parts of the 19th century, under the influence of different Foreign Secretaries. Blue Books are more complete from some parts of the century than others, but a lot was always omitted, and texts were abridged. These were sometimes flagged in the text by the word 'Extract', but that did not give any sense of scale or what was cut.

George Canning's tenure (1807–1809) stood out, as having designed a new system. Canning used it to get public support for his positions, for example, regarding South America. Robert Stewart (Lord Castelreagh (1812–1822)) was the pivot point between the early years when the government might refuse to publish certain papers, and the later period when it was not able to do that anymore. Henry Templeton (Lord Palmerston three incumbencies in the 1830s and 1840s) was unable to refuse the demands of the House of Commons, as Canning had done. Later, when he rose to Prime Minister, Palmerston embodied the "Golden Age" of Blue Books, publishing a large number of them, especially during the Russell Foreign Ministry incumbency (1859–1865). Foreign Secretaries under P.M. William Gladstone (three incumbencies between 1868 and 1886) also issued many Blue Books, but were more restrained; a large number were issued about the Eastern Question.

==== Reaction abroad ====
Publication meant that not only parliament and the public got to see the diplomatic documents, but foreign powers got to see them as well. Sometimes a government might be embarrassed by leaks from foreign sources, or publications from them; but they gave back as good as they got. By 1880 there were some informal rules, and foreign countries were consulted before publishing things that affected them. This prevented them from being used as instruments of policy, as under Canning or Palmerston.

=== World War I ===
==== Background ====
After 1885 the situation altered again, there was less pressure from Parliament, fewer party-based papers, and almost all publications were ordered by the Crown. Around the close of the century and beginning of the next, there was less disclosure of documents and less pressure from MPs and the public, and ministers became more restrained and secretive, for example with Sir Edward Grey, in the run-up to World War I. Penson & Temperley said, "As Parliament became more democratic its control over foreign policy declined, and, while Blue Books on domestic affairs expanded and multiplied at the end of the nineteenth century, those on foreign affairs lessened both in number and in interest." There were still numerous publications, but less diplomatic correspondence, and lots of treaty texts.

The assassination of Archduke Franz Ferdinand in Sarajevo on 28 June 1914, led to a month of diplomatic maneuvering between Austria-Hungary, Germany, Russia, France and Britain, called the July Crisis. Austria-Hungary correctly believed that Serbian officials were involved in the assassination and on 23 July sent Serbia an ultimatum intended to provoke a war. This led to Austria partially mobilizing, followed by Russia doing the same in support of Serbia. Austria declared war on Serbia on 28 July, and a series of partial mobilizations and diplomatic warnings followed, including Germany demanding Russia's demobilization, and warning France to remain neutral rather than come to Russia's aid. After various messages back and forth, misunderstandings, and erroneous assumptions about what other countries might do, Germany invaded Luxembourg and Belgium on 3–4 August, and Britain entered the war due to its 1839 treaty with Belgium. Europe was plunged into the Great War.

==== Media battle begins ====
As their armies began to clash, the opposing governments engaged in a media battle attempting to avoid blame for causing the war, and casting blame on other countries, through the publication of carefully selected documents, basically consisting of diplomatic exchanges.

The German White Book (Note: German title of the White Book was: "Das Deutsche Weißbuch über den Ausbruch des deutsch-russisch-französischen Krieges" ("The German White Book about the Outbreak of the German-Russian-French War".) appeared on 4 August 1914, and was the first such book to come out. It contains 36 documents. (Note: The German White Book was translated and published in English the same year.) Within a week, most other combatant countries had published their own book, each named with a different color name. France held off until 1 December 1914, when they finally published their Yellow Book. Other combatants in the war published similar books: the Blue Book of Britain, the Orange Book of Russia, the Yellow Book of France, and the Austro-Hungarian Red Book, the Belgian Grey Book, and the Serbian Blue Book.

==== Propaganda aspects ====
World War I color books attempted to cast the issuing country in a good light, and enemy countries in a poor light via numerous means including omission, selective inclusion, changes in the sequence of (undated) documents presented in order to imply certain documents appeared earlier or later than they actually did, or outright falsification.

A mistake in the compilation of the 1914 British Blue Book went unattended, and left the book vulnerable to attack by German propagandists. This unrectified mistake then led to certain details falsification in the French Yellow Book, which had copied them verbatim from the Blue Book.

German propagandists called the Yellow Book a vast "collection of falsifications". France was accused of having given its unconditional support to Russia. Germany tried to show that it was forced into general mobilization by that of Russia, which in turn, blamed Austria-Hungary. The Allied documents on the circumstances of the declaration of war, as well as the war crimes committed by the German army, constituted the basis on which the Allies would rely in 1919 to formulate Article 231 of the Treaty of Versailles assigning the exclusive responsibility for the outbreak of the war to Germany and Austria-Hungary.

A report to parliament by German jurist Hermann Kantorowicz after the war investigating the causes of World War I found that Germany had a large share of responsibility in triggering World War I, and cited the White Book as one example, in which about 75 percent of the documents presented in it were falsified.

==== Translations and republications ====
Translation of the color books into English was often performed or approved by the governments of origin; for example, the English translation of the Italian Green Book was approved by the Royal Italian Embassy.

The New York Times undertook the republication of the full text of numerous color books in English translation, including the Green Book, which was translated for the newspaper. In addition, the Times published the British Blue Book, the German White Book, the Russian Orange Book, the Gray Book of Belgium, the Yellow Book of France, and the Red Book of Austria-Hungary. (Note: The Times referred to some of them as "Papers" instead of "Books", including the "English White Paper", the "German White Paper", and the "Russian Orange Paper".)

=== World War II ===
Color books were also issued during World War II. The German government, continuing a tradition begun in the last war, also published color books with files seized from captured archives of occupied countries. To boost the credibility of the "white book", the Nazis appointed Hans-Adolf von Moltke, the German ambassador to Poland at the time of the invasion, as the volume's editor. Moltke edited the documents to give the appearance of Polish responsibility for the war, omitting material unfavorable to either himself or Adolf Hitler.

== National editions ==
=== British Blue Book ===
The British Blue Book has the oldest history, going back at least as far as 1633. In the early 17th century, blue books first came into use in England as a means of publishing diplomatic correspondence and reports. They were so named due to their blue cover. They were widely used in England in the 19th century, becoming an established tradition by the end of Lord Palmerston's 1859–1865 government.

In World War I, the British Blue Book was the second collection of national diplomatic documents about the war to appear; it came out just days after the German White Book. It contained 159 items and was submitted to Parliament before the session of 6 August 1914, after the British declaration of war on Germany. It appeared later in an expanded, and somewhat different version, and included an introduction and reports from parliamentary sessions in the beginning of August under the title, Great Britain and the European Crisis. This version contained the same 159 items from the first one, plus two more from the British embassies in Vienna and Berlin, after the outbreak of the war. Although incomplete (e.g., files on the English promises of aid to France, and on German concessions and proposals are not included), it is the richest of the colour books and, in the view of Max Beer, "despite its gaps, constitutes a true treasure trove of historical insights into the great crisis".

=== German White Book ===
The German White Book (German: Das Deutsche Weißbuch) was a publication by the German government of 1914 documenting their claims for the causes of World War I. The British institution of political blue books with official publications of diplomatic documents found its way to Germany relatively late. There was a lively debate about whether it was appropriate and necessary long before the first German one appeared, and also afterward among the German public, and especially in the state parliaments (Landtag).

The full title was Das deutsche Weißbuch über den Ausbruch des deutsch-russisch-französischen Krieges (The German White Book about the outbreak of the German-Russian-French war). An authorized English translation appeared in 1914.

The book contained extracts of diplomatic material intended to attribute the war's cause to other sources. There were many fewer dispatches in the White Book than in the British Blue Book, and those that were included were mostly to illustrate a point in the narrative of the White Book.

Germany also issued a white book with documents from the seized Belgium diplomatic archives, seeking to justify the German invasion and occupation.

=== Russian Orange Book ===
The Russian Orange Book came out in mid-August. On 20 September 1914, the New York Times published excerpts. The article said that examination of the Russian Orange Book in conjunction with reports in the British Blue Book conclusively establish responsibility on Germany and Austria for the war.

=== Serbian Blue Book ===
Study of the Serbian role in the war was slowed by delays in publication of the Serbian Blue Book. Some began to become available in the mid-1970s.

=== Belgian Gray Books ===
The two Belgian Gray Books came out after the Russian Orange Book and Serbian Blue Book. The second book was issued in 1915 by the Belgium government in exile.

=== French Yellow Book ===
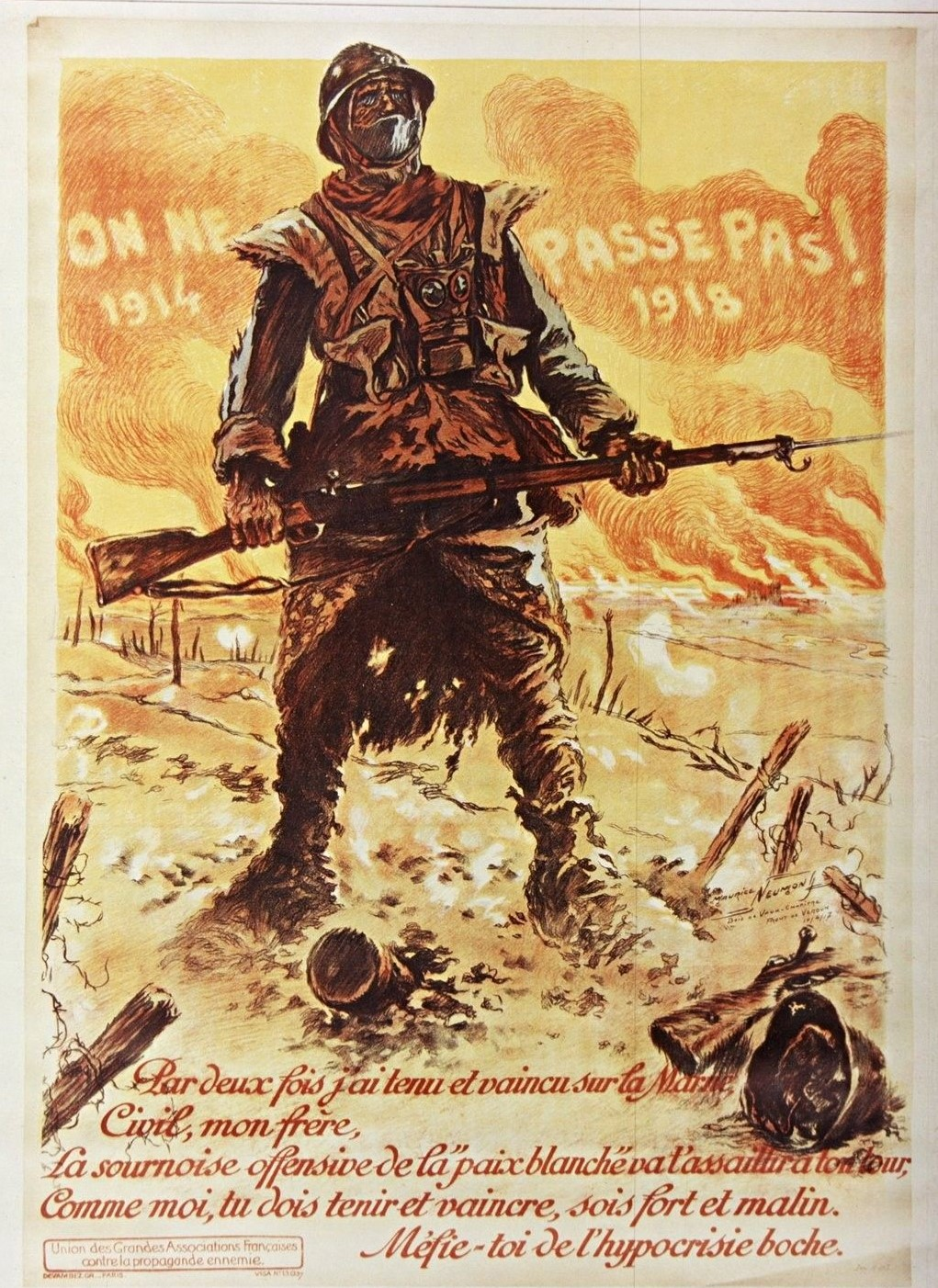
French WW I poster by Maurice Neumont, c. 1918

The French Yellow Book (Livre Jaune), completed after three months of work, contained 164 documents and came out on 1 December 1914. Unlike the others which were limited to the weeks before the start of the war, the Yellow Book included some documents from 1913, putting Germany in a bad light by shedding light on their mobilization for a European war. Some of the documents in the Yellow Book were challenged by Germany as not genuine, but their objections were mostly ignored, and the Yellow Book was widely cited as a resource in the July crisis of 1914.

It turned out after the war was over that the Yellow Book was not complete, or entirely accurate. Historians who gained access to previously unpublished French material were able to use it in their report to the French Senate entitled "Origins and responsibilities for the Great War" (Note: French: Les origines et les responsabilités de la grande guerre) as did ex-President Raymond Poincaré. The conclusion set forth in the report of the 1919 French Peace Commission is illustrative of the two-pronged goals of blaming their opponents while justifying their own actions, as laid out in two sentences:

The war was premeditated by the Central Powers, as well as by their Allies Turkey and Bulgaria, and is the result of acts deliberately committed with the intention of making it inevitable.

Germany, in concordance with Austria-Hungary, worked deliberately to have the many conciliatory proposals of the Entente Powers set aside, and their efforts to avoid war nullified. (Note: La guerre a été préméditée par les Puissances centrales, ainsi que par leurs Alliés, la Turquie et la Bulgarie et elle est le résultat d'actes délibérément commis dans l'intention de la rendre inévitable. L'Allemagne, d'accord avec l'Autriche-Hongrie, a travaillé délibérément a faire écarter les nombreuses propositions conciliatrices des Puissances de l'Entente et a réduire a néant leurs éfforts pour éviter la guerre.)

— Peace Conference Commission on the Responsibility of the Authors of the War and on Enforcement of Penalties

Later, publication of complete archives from the period of the July crisis by Germany, Britain, and Austria, as well as some from Soviet archives, revealed some truths that the Yellow Book conveniently left out. In particular Yellow Book document #118 showed a Russian mobilization in response to Austrian mobilization the day before on 30 July, but in fact, the order of mobilization was reversed; Russia mobilized first. After a contorted explanation by Quai d'Orsay, confidence in the Yellow Book was ruined, and historians avoided using it.

In his essay for the April 1937 issue of Foreign Affairs, Bernadotte E. Schmitt examined recently published diplomatic correspondence in the Documents Diplomatiques Français and compared it to the documents in the French Yellow Book published in 1914, concluding that the Yellow Book "was neither complete nor entirely reliable" and went into some detail in examining documents either missing from the Yellow Book, or presented out of order to confuse or mislead the sequence in which events occurred. He concluded,

The documents will not change existing views to any great extent. They will not establish the innocence of France in the minds of Germans. On the other hand, the French will be able to find in them a justification of the policy they pursued in July 1914; and in spite of Herr Hitler's recent declaration repudiating Article 231 of the Treaty of Versailles, they will continue, on the basis of these documents, to hold Germany primarily responsible for the Great War.

— France and the Outbreak of the World War

In the German White Book, anything that could benefit the Russian position was redacted.

=== Austrian Red Book ===
The Austrian Red Book (or Austro-Hungarian Red Book) goes back at least to the 19th century. An 1868 version was printed in London, and included cables and other diplomatic correspondence during the reign of Emperor Franz Josef, and covering such topics as the Treaty of Prague, the Luxembourg Crisis, the Treaty of London (1867), the Treaty of Vienna between Austria, France, and Italy in October 1866, five-power relations between Austria and France, England, Prussia, and Russia, as well as relations with the east (Greece, Serbia, Ottoman Empire).

Last among the great powers, Austria-Hungary published its files on the outbreak of the war in February 1915 in the Austro-Hungarian Red Book, entitled: "I. & R. Ministry of Foreign Diplomatic Affairs on the Historical Background of the 1914 War". (Note: German: "K. und k. Ministerium des Aeusseren-Diplomatischen Aktenstücke zur Vorgeschichte des Krieges 1914") Simultaneously, the Austro-Hungarian government published a compact popular edition of the Red Book, which included an introduction, and translations into German of the few documents written in English or French. The Red Book contained 69 items and covered the period 29 June to 24 August 1914.

It is not clear why the Austro-Hungarian government let over six months of war elapse before it followed the example of the other powers. This was unlike the case of the delayed French Yellow Book, whose later publication meant that the French public had no files for judging the diplomatic events before the war. For Austria-Hungary, the war was primarily an Austrian-Serbian war, and there was never any lack of documents about it from the outset.

=== Others ===
Other color books were used in other countries, including:

- Austria-Hungary – Green Book
- China – Yellow Book
- Finland – White Book
- Greece – White Book
- Italy – Green Book
- Japan – Gray Book
- Mexican – Green Book or Orange Book
- Netherlands – Orange Book
- Portugal – White Book
- Russian Empire – Orange Book
- Romania – Green Book
- Soviet – Red Book
- Spain – Red Book
- Switzerland – White book (unreleased)
- United States – Red Book

== Contemporary descriptions ==
=== World War I ===
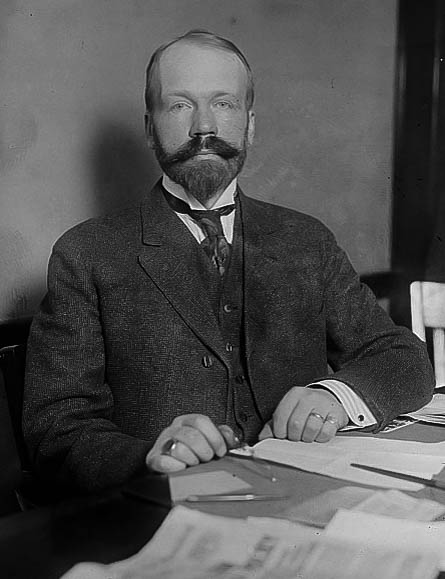
Edmund von Mach in 1915

Edmund von Mach's 1916 "Official Diplomatic Documents Relating to the Outbreak of the European War" gives the following introduction to the color books of World War I:

In constitutionally governed countries it is customary for the Executive at important times to lay before the Representatives of the people "collected documents" containing the information on which the Government has shaped its foreign policy.

In Great Britain these documents are often printed on large sheets of white paper, loosely bound, called "White Papers". If the documents are very important, they are later reprinted in pamphlet form, and are then called by the color of their cover, "Blue Books".

At the outbreak of the World War in 1914 several Governments besides that of Great Britain issued pamphlets of collected documents, and these have become known, by the color of their respective bindings, as the German "White Book", the French "Yellow Book", the Russian "Orange Book", and so on.

Following the previous customs of their respective countries the several Governments issued more or less exhaustive collections, and in each case were primarily guided by the desire to justify themselves before their own people.

In America the British Blue Book won the greatest favor, not only because it became known first but also because of its inherent worth. Its despatches are well written, and sufficiently numerous to tell a consecutive story. The book is well printed, provided with indexes and cross references, and represents the most scholarly work done by any of the European governments.

The German White Book, on the other hand, contains few despatches, and these only as illustrations of points made in an exhaustive argument. Such a presentation can be convincing only if one has confidence in the honesty of the author. There can be no doubt that as a source book for study the British Parliamentary Papers are superior to the German Papers, but even the British Papers are not, as many people have wished to believe, complete and do not, therefore, offer the final authority on which scholars can rely.

— Edmund von Mach, Official Diplomatic Documents Relating to the Outbreak of the European War (1916)

== See also ==
- British propaganda during World War I
- Causes of World War I
- Centre for the Study of the Causes of the War
- German entry into World War I
- History of propaganda
- History of the United Kingdom during World War I
- Home front during World War I
- Italian propaganda during World War I
- Opposition to World War I
- Propaganda in World War I

== Works cited ==
- "The 'Color' Books". St Joseph Gazette. St Joseph, Missouri. 14 June 1915.
- "Nazis show heaps of Polish papers". 3 April 1940. p. 14.
- Austria. Bundesministerium für Auswärtige Angelegenheiten (1868). Austrian red-book, diplomatic correspondence of the Imperial-royal ministry for foreign affairs, from November 1866 to 31st December 1867, No.1. London: Dulau et Company. OCLC 557490264.
- Beer, Max (1915). "Das Regenbogen-Buch": deutsches Wiessbuch, österreichisch-ungarisches Rotbuch, englisches Blaubuch, französisches Gelbbuch, russisches Orangebuch, serbisches Blaubuch und belgisches Graubuch, die europäischen Kriegsverhandlungen [The Rainbow Book: German White Book, Austrian-Hungarian Red Book, English Blue Book, French Yellow Book, Russian Orange Book, Serbian Blue Book and Belgian Grey Book, the European war negotiations] (2nd, improved ed.). Bern: F. Wyss. pp. 16–. OCLC 9427935.
- Belgium (1915) [1st pub. 1915:Hachette as Correspondance Diplomatique relative à la Guerre de 1914–1915]. The second Belgian grey book Part 1 and Part 2 (Section 10). London: Darling and Son. OCLC 558553511. Archived from the original on 31 October 2009.
- France. Ministère des affaires étrangères; Commission de publication des documents relatifs aux origines de la guerre de 1914 (1936). Documents diplomatiques français (1871-1914) [French diplomatic documents (1871-1914)] (in French). Vol. Tome X, (17 mars-23 juillet 1914) (3e Série, (1911-1914) ed.). Imprimerie Nationale. OCLC 769058353.
- France. Ministère des affaires étrangères; Commission de publication des documents relatifs aux origines de la guerre de 1914 (1936). Documents diplomatiques français (1871-1914) [French diplomatic documents] (in French). Vol. Tome XI, (24 juillet-4 août 1914) (3e Série, (1911-1914) ed.). Imprimerie Nationale. OCLC 769062659.
- Germany. Auswärtiges Amt (1914). The German White-book: Authorized Translation. Documents Relating to the Outbreak of the War, with Supplements. Liebheit & Thiesen. OCLC 1158533.
- Hamilton, Keith (22 February 2007). "Falsifying the Record: Entente Diplomacy and the Preparation of the Blue and Yellow Books on the War Crisis of 1914". Diplomacy & Statecraft. 18 (1): 89–108. doi:10.1080/09592290601163019. ISSN 0959-2296. OCLC 4650908601. S2CID 154198441.
- Hartwig, Matthias (12 May 2014). "Colour books". In Bernhardt, Rudolf; Bindschedler, Rudolf; Max Planck Institute for Comparative Public Law and International Law (eds.). Encyclopedia of Public International Law. Vol. 9 International Relations and Legal Cooperation in General Diplomacy and Consular Relations. Amsterdam: North-Holland. ISBN 978-1-4832-5699-3. OCLC 769268852.
- Heindel, Richard Heathcote; Berthold, Arthur Benedict; Miller, Marion G (1940). War Check List: A Working Guide to the Background and Early Months of the War (chiefly, September 1938 to January 31, 1940 ) ... (typewritten). Philadelphia: War Documentation Service. OCLC 559210390.
- Huebsch, B.W. (1921). The German Army in Belgium: The White Book of May 1915.
- "Documents Regarding the European War Series. no. VIII, Italy's Green Book". International Conciliation (93). New York: American Assoc. for Int'l Conciliation: 7–66. August 1915. OCLC 58932234.
- Italy; Ministero degli affari esteri [in Italian] (1915). Italy's Green Book. Documents regarding the European war, no. VIII; and International conciliation, no. 93. Translated by royal Italian embassy. New York: American Assoc. for Intl Conciliation. OCLC 894088650.
- "Notable war books". The Los Angeles Times. 11 July 1915. p. 19. "[T]here are the white, orange, red, gray, blue rainbow books wherein the respective governments present their official Justifications"
- Kann, Robert A. (December 1968). "GUTACHTEN ZUR KRIEGSSCHULDFRAGE 1914. AUS DEM NACHLASS. by Hermann Kantorowicz. Edited and introduced by Geiss Imanuel. With a preface by Gustav W. Heinemann. (Frankfurt am Main: Europäische Verlagsanstalt. 1967. pp. 452. DM 28.)". Central European History. 1 (4): 383–389. doi:10.1017/S0008938900014977. OCLC 4669487703. S2CID 145105893.
- Kantorowicz, Hermann; Geiss, Imanuel (1967). Gutachten zur Kriegsschuldfrage 1914 [Report on the War guilt question 1914] (in German). Frankfurt: Europäische Verlagsanstalt. OCLC 654661194.
- Kempe, Hans (2008). Der Vertrag von Versailles und seine Folgen: Propagandakrieg gegen Deutschland [The Treaty of Versailles and its Consequences: Propaganda War against Germany]. Vaterländischen Schriften (in German). Vol. 7 Kriegschuldlüge 1919 [War Guilt Lies 1919]. Mannheim: Reinhard Welz Vermittler Verlag e.K. pp. 238–257 (vol. 7 p.19). ISBN 978-3-938622-16-2.
- Martel, Gordon (2014). "Making Sense of the Madness". The Month that Changed the World: July 1914. Oxford University Press. ISBN 978-0-19-966538-9. OCLC 881361668.
- "First World War | German White Book". United Kingdom: The National Archives.
- "Russia Worked For Peace; Her Orange Book, Says The London Times, Puts War Squarely Upon Germany". The New York Times. New York. 21 September 1914. "The Times today in publishing extended extracts from the Russian official "Orange Book" upon the diplomatic antecedents of the war, says that these, taken in conjunction with the official papers issued by the British Foreign Office, complete the chain of evidence fixing irrefutably upon Germany and Austria the responsibility for the outbreak of the war."
  - "Russia Worked For Peace; Her Orange Book, Says The London Times, Puts War Squarely Upon Germany". The New York Times. 21 September 1914.
- Mulder, Arnold (1 May 1940). "Those "Color Books"". The Grand Rapids Press. p. 10.
- Peace Conference Commission on the Responsibility of the Authors of the War and on Enforcement of Penalties. (29 March 1919). "1 Responsabilité des auteurs de la Guerre". Rapport présenté à la conférence des préliminaires de paix par la commission des responsabilités des auteurs de la guerre et sanctions: Nur für den Dienstgebrauch. Conférence des préliminaires de paix. 29 Mars 1919. [Umschlagtitel] (conference report). Paris: s.t. OCLC 632565106.
- Penson, Lillian M.; Temperley, Harold W. V. (1966) [1st pub. Cambridge UP (1938)]. A Century of Diplomatic Blue Books, 1814-1914. London: Frank Cass. ISBN 978-0-7146-1519-6. OCLC 1088479381.
- Sass, Johann (8 June 2020) [1st pub: De Gruyter (1928)]. "Zweiter Anhang: Farbbuecher fremder Staaten" [Appendix Two: Color books of foreign countries]. Die deutschen Weißbücher zur auswärtigen Politik 1870–1914: Geschichte und Bibliographie [The German White Papers on Foreign Policy] (in German). Berlin: De Gruyter. pp. 184–211. ISBN 978-3-11-163805-8. OCLC 560747392.
- Schirmann, Léon (2003). Été 1914. Mensonges et désinformation : comment on " vend " une guerre… [Summer 1914. Lies and disinformation: how to "sell" a war] (in French). Paris: Italiques. p. 134. ISBN 978-2-910536-34-3. OCLC 606468923.
- Schmitt, Bernadotte E. (1 April 1937). "France and the Outbreak of the World War". Foreign Affairs. 26 (3). Council on Foreign Relations: 516–536. doi:10.2307/20028790. JSTOR 20028790. Archived from the original on 25 November 2018.
- Stevenson, David (1996). Armaments and the Coming of War: Europe, 1904–1914. New York: Clarendon press. ISBN 978-0-19-820208-0. OCLC 33079190.
- Stokes, Gale (1976). "The Serbian Documents from 1914: A Preview". The Journal of Modern History. 48 (S3): 69–84. doi:10.1086/241528. S2CID 144372746.
- Turner, L. F. C. (1968). "The Russian Mobilization in 1914". Journal of Contemporary History. 3 (1). Sage Publications: 65–68. doi:10.1177/002200946800300104. ISSN 0022-0094. JSTOR 259967. OCLC 5548909084. S2CID 161629020.
- Umscheid, Arthur G. (January 1943). "Historiography and World War II". The Social Studies. 34 (1): 32–37. doi:10.1080/00220973.1936.11016785. ISSN 0037-7996.
- von Mach, Edmund (1916). Official Diplomatic Documents Relating to the Outbreak of the European War: With Photographic Reproductions of Official Editions of the Documents (Blue, White, Yellow, Etc., Books). New York: Macmillan. LCCN 16019222. OCLC 651023684. Electronic copy from HathiTrust.
- Zala, Sacha (2001). Geschichte unter der Schere politischer Zensur: amtliche Aktensammlungen im internationalen Vergleich [History under the scissors of political censorship: official records in international comparison] (in German). München: Oldenbourg. ISBN 348656546X.
- Willmott, H.P. (2003). World War I. Dorling Kindersley. ISBN 978-0-7894-9627-0. OCLC 52541937.
- Germany. Auswärtiges Amt (1940). Polnische Dokumente zur Vorgeschichte des Krieges [Polish documents on the background of the war] (in German). Berlin: Zentralverlag der NSDAP.
- Kabermann, Heinz (1940). "Die diplomatischen Farbbücher" [The diplomatic color book]. Zeitschrift für Politik (in German). 30: 151–171. ISSN 0044-3360.

Weinberg, Gerhard (1980). The Foreign Policy of Hitler's Germany : Starting World War II 1937–39. Chicago: University of Chicago Press. ISBN 0391038265.
