= Propaganda in World War I =

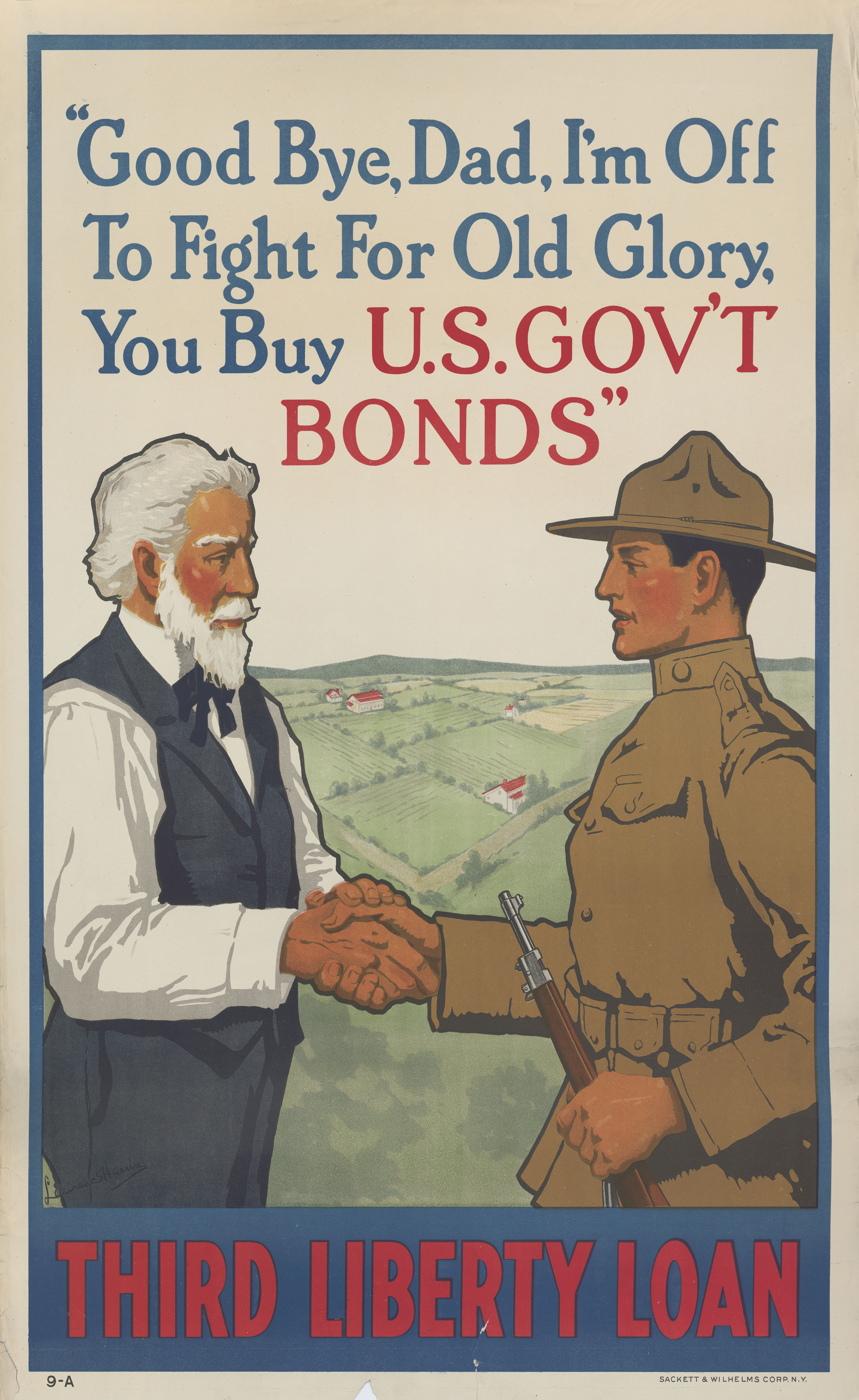
"Good Bye, Dad, I'm Off To Fight For Old Glory, You Buy U.S. Gov't Bonds," World War I poster

World War I was the first war in which mass media and propaganda played a significant role in keeping the people at home informed on what occurred on the battlefields. It was also the first war in which governments systematically produced propaganda as a way to target the public and alter their opinion.

According to Eberhard Demm and Christopher H. Sterling:

Propaganda could be used to arouse hatred of the foe, warn of the consequences of defeat, and idealize one's own war aims in order to mobilize a nation, maintain its morale, and make it fight to the end. It could explain setbacks by blaming scapegoats such as war profiteers, hoarders, defeatists, dissenters, pacifists, left-wing socialists, spies, shirkers, strikers, and sometimes enemy aliens so that the public would not question the war itself or the existing social and political system.

Propaganda by all sides presented a highly cleansed, partisan view of fighting. Censorship rules placed strict restrictions on frontline journalism and reportage, a process that continues to affect the historical record — for instance, possibly due to image concerns, there is no known visual evidence of American shotgun use during the war. Propagandists utilized a variety of motifs and ideological underpinnings, such as atrocity propaganda, propaganda dedicated to nationalism and patriotism, and propaganda focused on women.

== Media and censorship ==
The media was expected to take sides, not to remain neutral, during World War I. When Wilhelm II declared a state of war in Germany on July 31, the commanders of the army corps (German: Stellvertretende Generalkommandos) took control of the administration, including implementing a policy of press censorship, which was carried out under Walter Nicolai.

Censorship regulations were put in place in Berlin, with the War Press Office fully controlled by the Army High Command. Journalists were allowed to report from the front only if they were experienced officers who had "recognized patriotic views". Briefings to the press created a high degree of uniformity in wartime reporting. Contact between journalists and fighting troops was prohibited, and journalists spoke only to high-ranking officers and commanders.

Gassed (1919), painted by John Singer Sargent

Both sides initially prohibited any photography or filming. The primary visual representation relied on war painting, but the Germans used some heavily-censored filmed newsreels. The French preferred painting over photography, but some parties used photographs to document the aftermath of damage that had been inflicted on cities by artillery. However, photographs of battle scenes were re-enactments by necessity.

When World War I started, the United States had become a leader in the art of filmmaking and the new profession of commercial advertising. Such newly-discovered technologies played an instrumental role in the shaping of the American mind and the altering of public opinion into supporting the war. Every country used careful edited newsreels to combine straight news reports and propaganda.

== By country ==
=== Germany ===
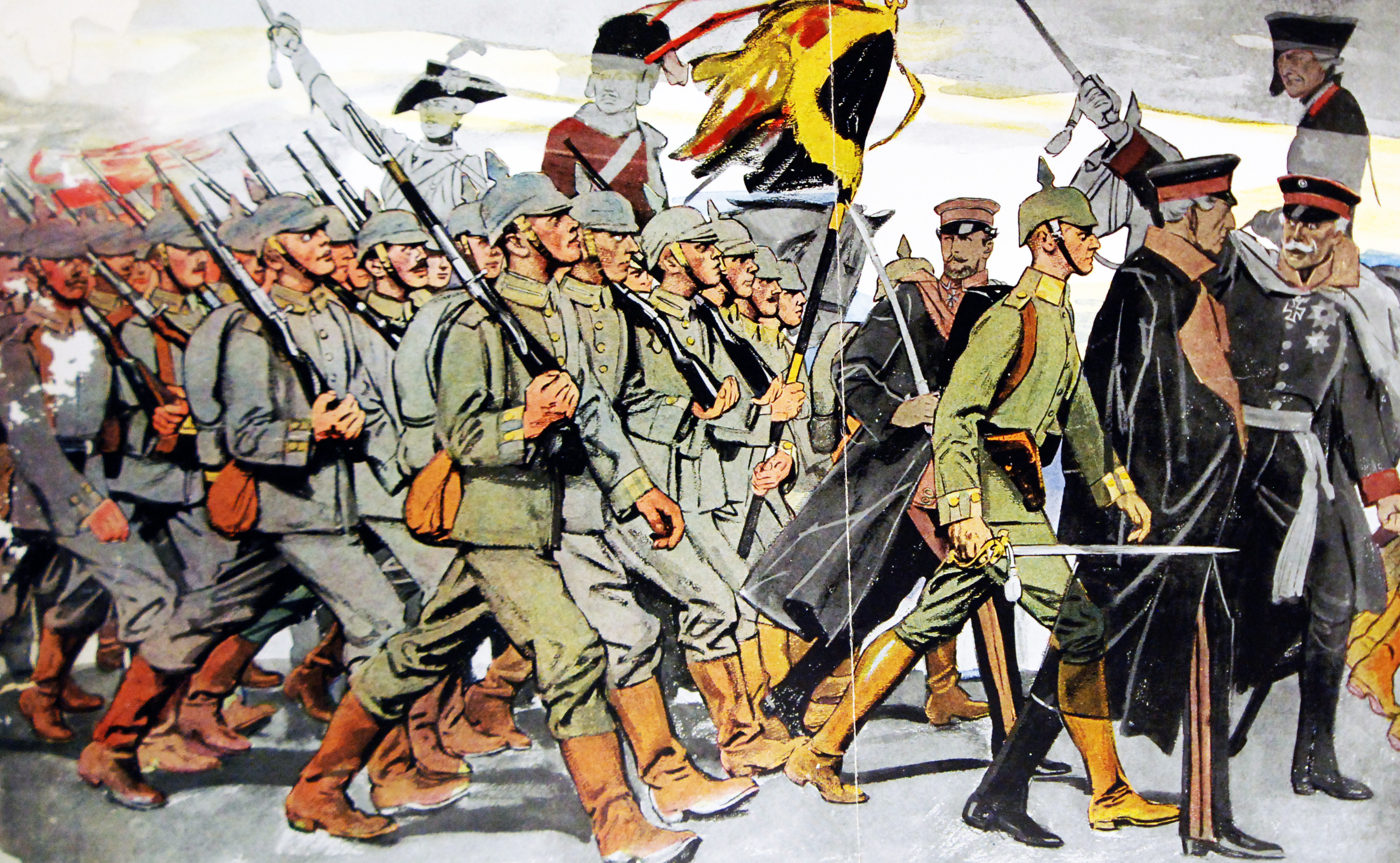
World War I propaganda of Germany

Official German propaganda had multiple themes: A) It proclaimed that German victory was a certainty. B) It explained that Germany was fighting a war of defence. C) Enemy atrocities were denounced, including its starvation plan for German civilians, use of dum dum bullets, and the use of black soldiers. D) The rhetoric exalted Germany's historic mission to promote high culture and true civilization, celebrating the slogan "work, order, duty" over the enemy's "liberty, equality, fraternity." E). It explained that German victory would benefit all of mankind, freeing the seas for all nations, and enabling the downtrodden colonies of the Allies to liberate themselves. F). Germany needed land to expand, as an outlet for its surplus population, talent, organizing ability, financial capital, and manufacturing output. G). The riches of the world, especially raw materials, controlled by the British and the French, must be disgorged by the enemy to the benefit of Germany.

Midway through the war, they launched a wave of anti-Jewish propaganda to blame their holy war’s failures on the ‘evil force’ of the Jews, as many believed that they weren't serving their country in the war. This misinformation was supported by the withholding of the data in the 1916 Judenzählung, or Jewish Census, which surveyed the number of Jews in the military to see if they were serving proportionally. It found that the proportion of Jews serving in the military was in fact greater than the proportion of Germans, but because the census data wasn’t publicized, doubts and antisemitic stereotypes remained prevalent.

Different themes were employed in propaganda targeting various audiences. The Germans also funded revolutionary propaganda in support of the Bolsheviks in Russia.

=== Russia ===
Russian World War I propaganda posters generally showed the enemies as demonic, one example showing Kaiser Wilhelm as a devil figure. They would all depict the war as ‘patriotic’, with one poster saying that the war was Russia’s second ‘patriotic war’, the first being against Napoleon. Russian press operating in the Caucasus had been reporting on a "really intolerable situation" in Anatolia since before the formal commencement of hostilities with the Ottoman Empire.

=== Armenia ===
Propaganda was one of the tools employed by the Armenians of the Caucasus to advance the Armenian revolutionary movement. The effort to recruit Ottoman Armenians to enlist in the Russian army was supported by Hampartsum Arakelyan, editor of Mshak, a leading Armenian language circular in the Caucasus region. During the Russo-Turkish War of 1878 that set the stage for World War I, Mshak was especially active in publishing pro-Russian propaganda. According to Tasnapetean the intervening years had left the Armenians unprepared to confront the violence of the Armenian Genocide that was unleashed on them in 1915:

...it is evident that after the first few years of elation after the Ottoman Constitution, and despite the gradual deterioration of conditions after 1911, as well as the spread of Pan-Turanian thought and the efforts of the 'Turkji' movement, the Armenians of Turkey―including the executive bodies and ranks of the Dashnaktsutiun―were not psychologically or practically ready in 1915 to resort to general self-defense, let along a general uprising. They had, starting in 1912, elected to again appeal to international diplomacy instead of relying on their own armed struggle.

=== United Kingdom ===
==== The Order of the White Feather ====
In August 1914, British Admiral Charles Penrose Fitzgerald enlisted a group of women to give a white feather to men not in uniform. White feathers had the symbolic meaning of cowardice, as a result of the book, The Four Feathers. Fitzgerald hoped that the men would be embarrassed and volunteer for the army. The initiative was a great success and spread throughout the UK, with women taking it upon themselves to distribute white feathers. However, many of the men labeled cowards were in fact civilians working in the military industry, soldiers on leave or wounded veterans. As a result, it became necessary for the government to issue badges to civilian men that were working in roles that contributed to the war effort, and in September 1916 the government began issuing the silver war badge to former servicemen, in an attempt to stop such men being targeted by the initiative.

=== United States ===
'Destroy this mad brute' A U.S. WWI propaganda poster depicting the Germans

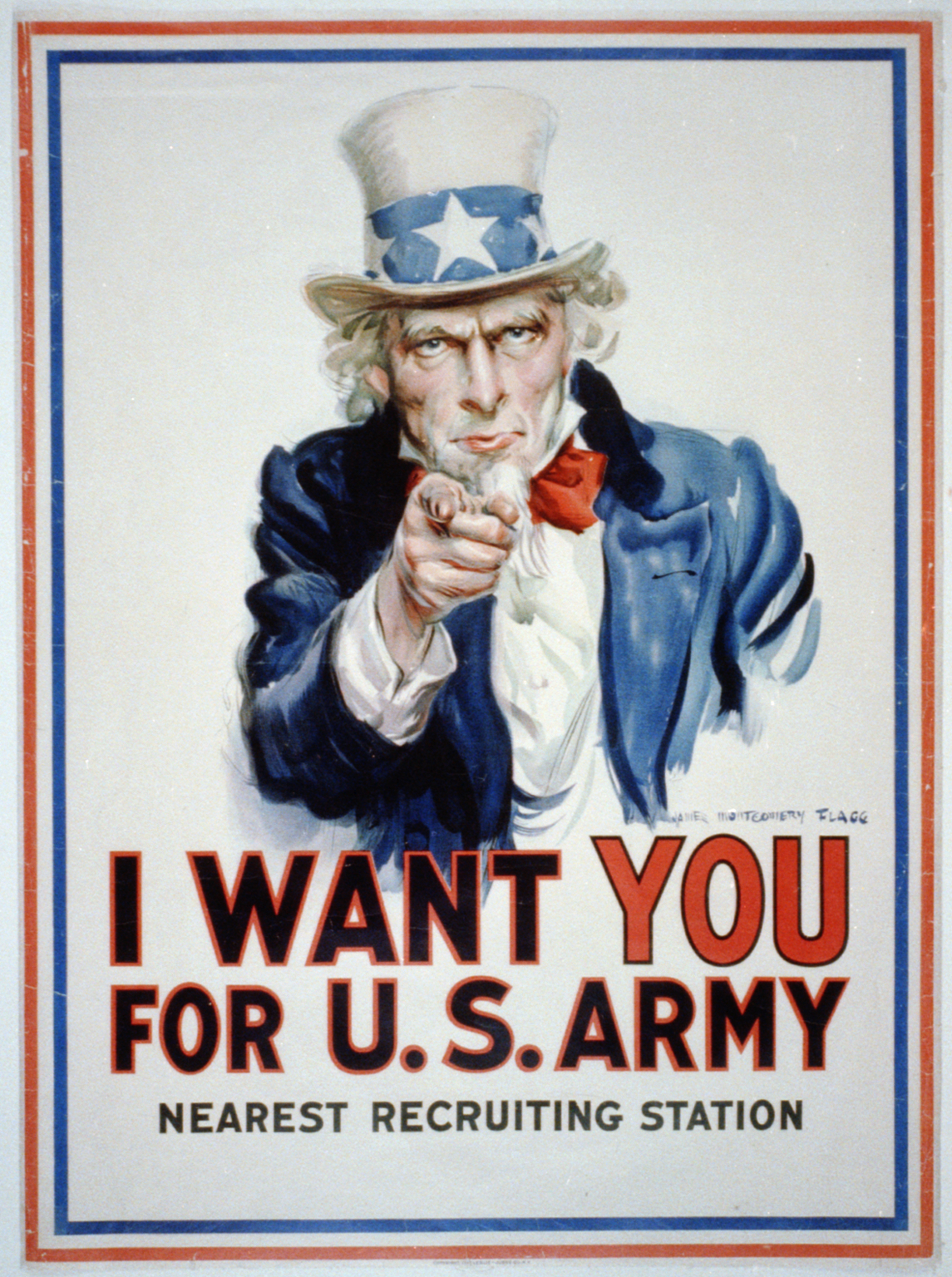
Uncle Sam's call to arms

The most influential man behind the propaganda in the United States was President Woodrow Wilson. In his famous January 1918 declaration, he outlined the "Fourteen Points," which he said that the United States would fight to defend. Aside from the restoration of freedom in Europe in countries that were suppressed by the power of Germany, Wilson's Fourteen Points called for transparency regarding discussion of diplomatic matters, the free navigation of the seas in peace and in war, and equal trade conditions among all nations. The Fourteen Points became very popular across Europe and motivated German socialists especially. It served as a blueprint for world peace to be used for peace negotiations after the war. Wilson's points inspired audiences around the world and greatly strengthened the belief that Britain, France, and America were fighting for noble goals.

The 1915 film The German Side of the War was one of the only American films to show the German perspective of the war. At the theater, lines stretched around the block; the screenings were received with such enthusiasm that would-be moviegoers resorted to purchasing tickets from scalpers.

Propaganda made American entry into the war possible, but many propagandists later confessed to fabricating atrocity propaganda. By the 1930s, Americans had grown resistant to atrocity stories. A 1940 study of American public opinion determined that the collective memory of World War I was the primary reason for Allied propaganda during World War II serving only to intensify anti-war sentiment in the United States.

==== Committee on Public Information ====
In 1917 Wilson created the Committee on Public Information, which reported directly to him and was essentially a massive generator of propaganda. The Committee on Public Information was responsible for producing films; commissioning posters; publishing numerous books and pamphlets; purchasing advertisements in major newspapers; and recruiting businessmen, preachers, and professors to serve as public speakers in charge of altering public opinion at the communal level. The committee, headed by the former investigative journalist George Creel, emphasized the message that America's involvement in the war was entirely necessary for achieving the salvation of Europe from the German and enemy forces. In his book titled How we Advertised America, Creel states that the committee was called into existence to make World War I a fight that would be a "verdict for mankind." He called the committee a voice that was created to plead the justice of America's cause before the jury of public opinion. Creel also refers to the committee as a "vast enterprise in salesmanship" and "the world's greatest adventure in advertising." The committee's message resonated deep within every American community and served as an organization that was responsible for carrying the full message of American ideals to every corner of the civilized globe. Creel and his committee used every possible mode to get their message across, including printed word, the spoken word, the motion picture, the telegraph, the poster, and the signboard. All forms of communication were put to use to justify the causes that compelled America to take arms.

Creel set out systematically to reach every person in the United States multiple times with patriotic information about how the individual could contribute to the war effort. The CPI also worked with the post office to censor seditious counter propaganda. Creel set up divisions in his new agency to produce and to distribute innumerable copies of pamphlets, newspaper releases, magazine advertisements, films, school campaigns, and the speeches of the Four Minute Men. The CPI created colourful posters that appeared in every store window to catch the attention of passers-by for a few seconds. Cinemas were widely attended, and the CPI trained thousands of volunteer speakers to make patriotic appeals during four-minute breaks, which were needed to change reels. They also spoke at churches, lodges, fraternal organizations, labour unions, and even logging camps. Creel boasted that in 18 months, his 75,000 volunteers had delivered over 7.5 million four-minute orations to over 300 million listeners in a nation of 103 million people. The speakers attended training sessions through local universities and were given pamphlets and speaking tips on a wide variety of topics, such as buying Liberty bonds, registering for the draft, rationing food, recruiting unskilled workers for munitions jobs, and supporting Red Cross programs.

Historians were assigned to write pamphlets and in-depth histories of the causes of the European war. After World War I started, both sides of the conflict used propaganda to shape international opinion. Thus, propaganda become a weapon to influence countries.

== Self-justification and assigning blame ==
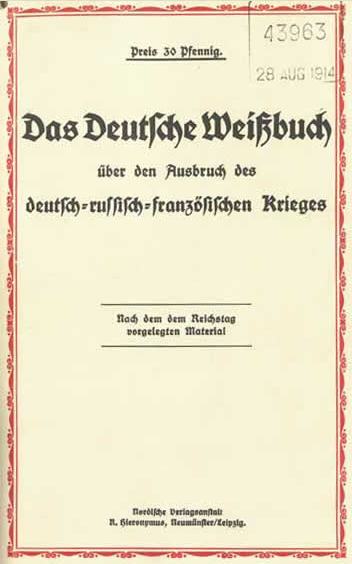
Cover of The German White Book

As their armies began to clash, the opposing governments engaged in a media battle attempting to avoid blame for causing the war and casting blame on other countries by the publication of carefully-selected documents, which basically consisted of diplomatic exchanges. The Germans were the first to do so, and other major participants followed within days.

The German White Book (Note: The German title of the White Book was Das Deutsche Weißbuch über den Ausbruch des deutsch-russisch-französischen Krieges ("The German White Book about the Outbreak of the German-Russian-French War".) appeared on 4 August 1914. The first such book to come out, it contained 36 documents. In the German White Book, anything that could benefit the Russian position was redacted. (Note: The German White Book was translated and published in English the same year.) Within a week, most other combatant countries had published their own book, each named with a different color name. France held off until 1 December 1914, when it finally published its Yellow Book. Other combatants in the war published similar books: the Blue Book of Britain, the Orange Book of Russia, the Yellow Book of France, and the Austro-Hungarian Red Book, the Belgian Grey Book, and the Serbian Blue Book.

== Atrocity propaganda ==
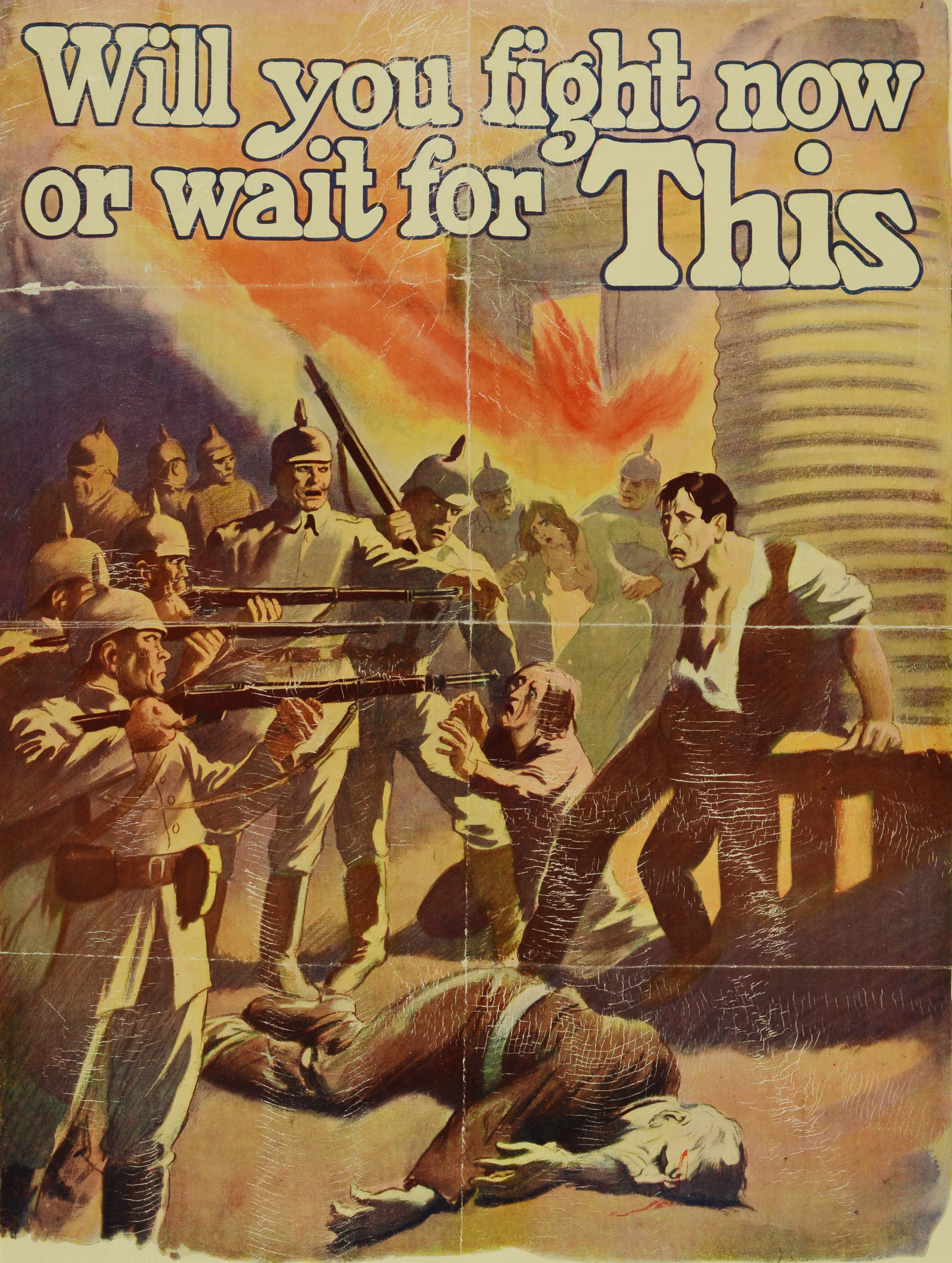
Anti-German atrocity propaganda

Atrocity propaganda exploiting sensational stories of rape, mutilation, and wanton murder of prisoners by the Germans filled the Allied press. The German and the Austro-Hungarian soldiers were depicted as inhumane savages, and their barbarity was emphasized as a way to provide justification for the war. In 1914, the prominent forensic scientist R.A. Reiss was commissioned by the Serbian prime minister to conduct an investigation on war crimes. It was done to depict the multiple acts of violence that had been committed against civilians by the occupying Austro-Hungarian forces in Serbia in 1914. The reports were written in vivid detail and described individual acts of violence against civilians, soldiers, and prisoners of war. Some of the actions included the use of forbidden weapons, the demolition of ancient libraries and cathedrals, and the rape and the torture of civilians. Graphic illustrations, accompanied by first-hand testimonies that described the crimes as savagely unjust, were compelling reminders to justify the war. Other forms of atrocity propaganda depicted the alternative to war to involve German occupation and domination, which was regarded as unacceptable across the political spectrum. As the Socialist Pioneer of Northampton put it in 1916, there could "be no peace while the frightful menace of world domination by force of German armed might looms about and above us".

The Irish journalist Kevin Myers reported on German atrocities in the war, and he said that in doing so, he drew the ire of Irish nationalists:

I also wrote of German atrocities in Belgium that had aroused the wrath of nationalist Ireland - the sacking of Louvain in particular - and this too was not merely a revelation but a provocation to some. One pugnacious subeditor, a tribally verdant Glasgow-born, Celtic-supporting Ulsterman, came up to me, almost tapping me on the chest. 'That stuff about German atrocities is just British propaganda. British fucking propaganda. There were no German atrocities. I always knew you were a Brit at heart. Now you've proved it!'

Propaganda was used in the war, like other wars, with the truth suffering. Propaganda ensured that the people learned only what their governments wanted them to know. The lengths to which governments would go to try to blacken the enemy's name reached a new level during the war. To ensure that everybody thought as the government wanted, all forms of information were controlled. Newspapers were expected to print what governments wanted readers to read. That would appear to be a form of censorship, but the newspapers of Britain, which were effectively controlled by the media barons of the time, were happy to follow and printed headlines that were designed to stir up emotions, regardless of whether or not they were accurate. The most infamous headlines included "Belgium child's hands cut off by Germans" and "Germans crucify Canadian officer".

== Use of patriotism and nationalism ==
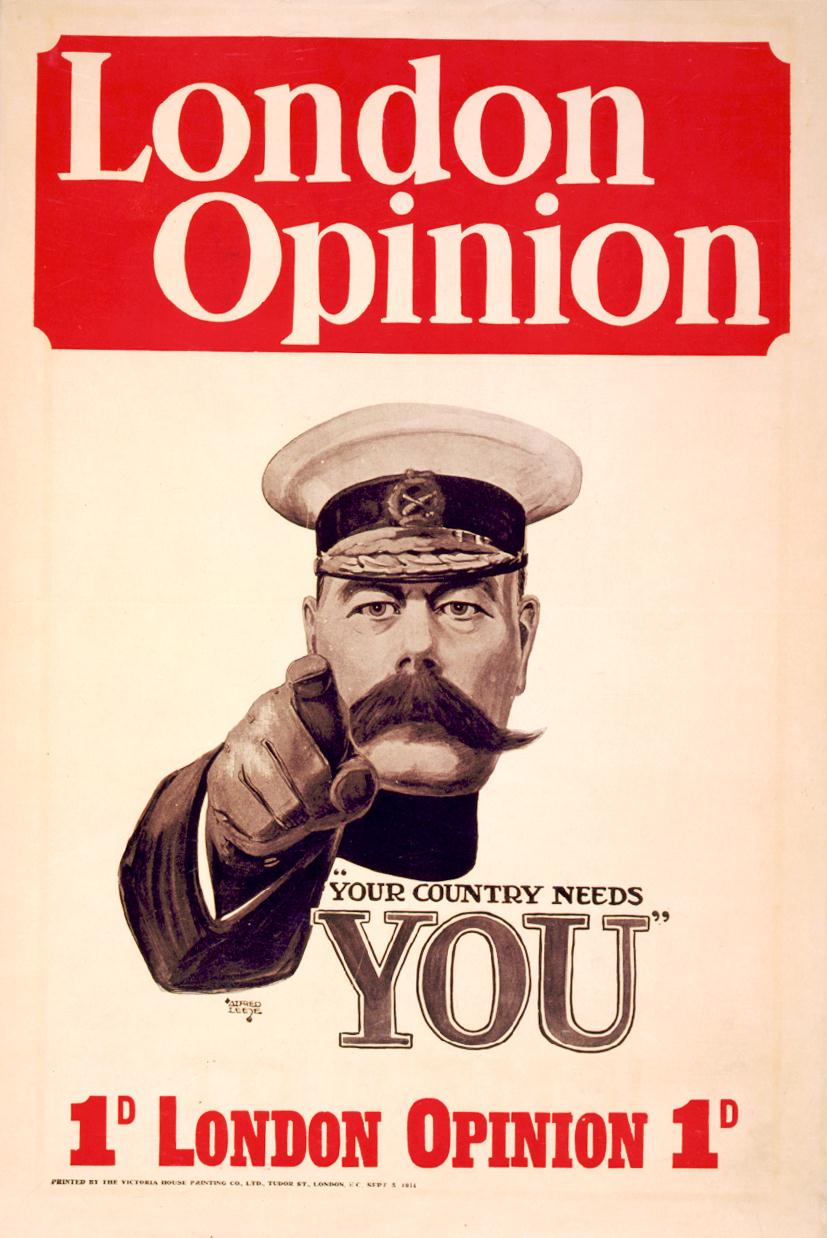
Kitchener poster by Alfred Leete

Patriotism and nationalism were two of the most important themes of propaganda. In 1914, the British Army was made up of not only professional soldiers but also volunteers and so the government relied heavily on propaganda as a tool to justify the war to the public eye. It was used to promote recruitment into the armed forces and to convince civilians that if they joined, their sacrifices would be rewarded. One of the most impressionable images of the war was the "Your Country Needs You" poster, a distinctive recruitment poster of Lord Kitchener (similar to the later Uncle Sam poster) pointing at his British audience to convince it to join the war effort. Another message that was deeply embedded in national sentiment the religious symbolism of St George, who was shown slaying a dragon, which represented the German forces. Images of enthusiastic patriotism seemed to encapsulate the tragedy of the European and imperial populations. Such images conjured up feelings of required patriotism and activism among those who were influenced.

The German Kaiser often appeared in Allied propaganda. His pre-1898 image of a gallant Victorian gentleman was long gone and was replaced by a dangerous troublemaker in the pre-1914 era. During the war, he became the personified image of German aggression; by 1919, the British press was demanding his execution. He died in exile in 1941, and his former enemies had moderated their criticism toward him and instead turned the hatred against Hitler.

== Use as weapon ==
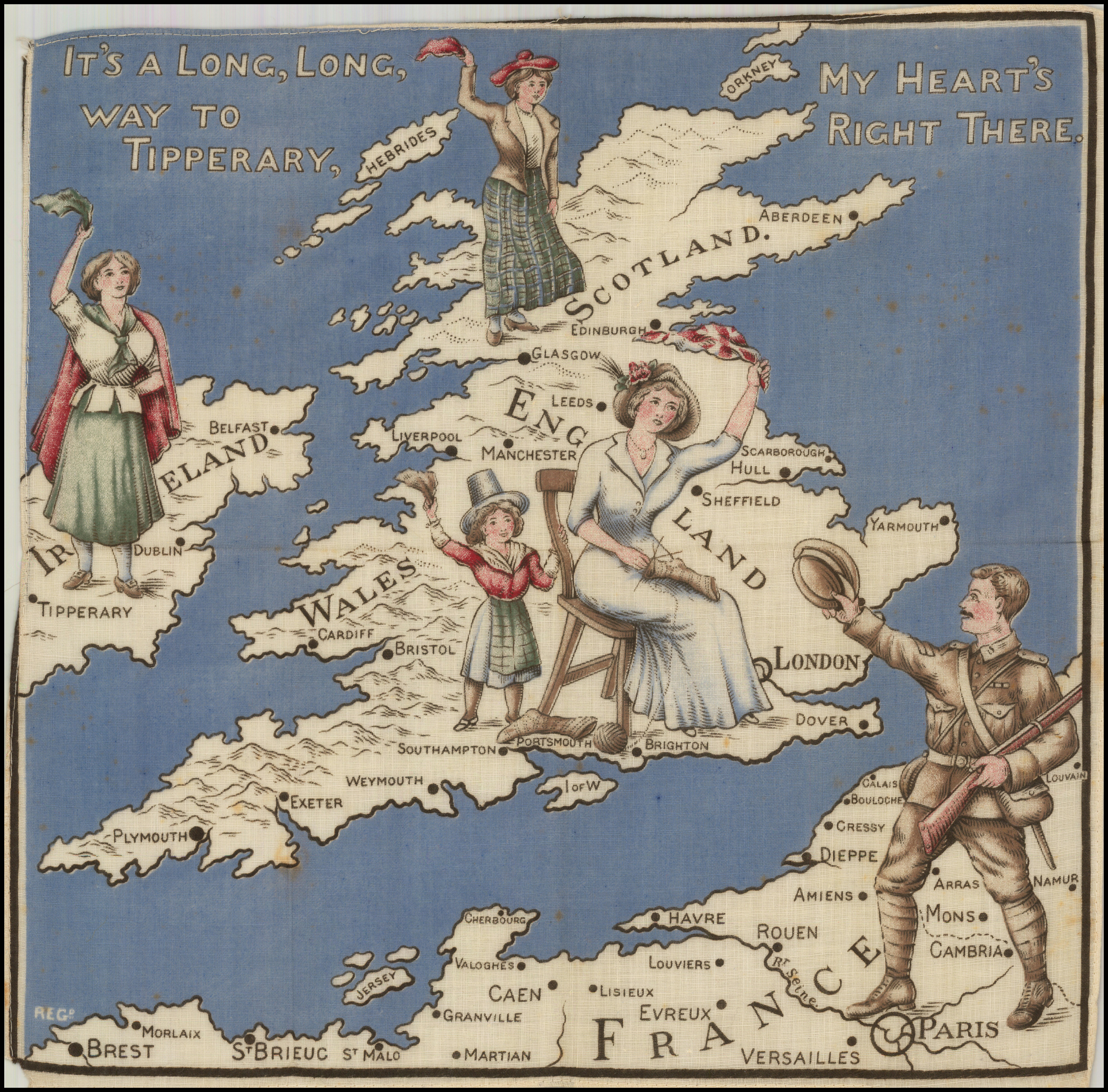
Patriotic pictorial map of the British Isles, c. 1914

The major foreign ministries prepared propaganda designed to reach public opinion and elite opinion in other countries, especially the neutral powers. For example, the British were especially effective in turning American opinion against Germany before 1917. Propaganda thus became an integral part of the diplomatic history of World War I and was designed to build support for the cause or to undermine support for the enemy. Eberhard Demm and Christopher H. Sterling, state:

Propaganda could also win over neutral states by encouraging friendly elements and local warmongers, or, at a minimum, keep neutrals out of the war by fostering non-intervention or pacifist views.... It could help retain allies, break up enemy alliances, and prepare exhausted or dissatisfied nations to defect or make a separate piece.

Nonmilitary propaganda into neutral countries war was designed to build support for the cause or to undermine support for the enemy. Wartime diplomacy focused on five issues: propaganda campaigns to shape news reports and commentary; defining and redefining the war goals, which became harsher as the war went on; luring neutral nations (Italy, the Ottoman Empire, Bulgaria and Romania) into the coalition by offering slices of enemy territory; and encouragement by the Allies of nationalistic minority movements within the Central Powers, especially among Czechs, Poles, and Arabs.

In addition, multiple peace proposals came from neutrals and from both sides although none of them progressed very far. Some were neutral efforts to end the horrors. Others were propaganda ploys to show one side as being reasonable and the other as obstinate.

As soon as the war began, Britain cut Germany's undersea communication cables as a way to ensure that the Allies had a monopoly on the most expedient means of transmitting news from Europe to press outlets in the United States. That was a way to influence reporting of the war around the world and to gain sympathy and support from the other nations. In 1914, a secret British organization, Wellington House, was set up and called for journalists and newspaper editors to write articles that sympathised with Britain as a way to counter statements that were made by the enemy. Wellington House implemented the action not only through favourable reports in the press of neutral countries but also by publishing its own newspapers, which were circulated around the globe. Wellington House was so secret that much of Parliament was in the dark. Wellington House had a staff of 54 people, which made it the largest British foreign propaganda organisation. From the Wellington House came to the publication The War Pictorial, which by December 1916 had reached a circulation of 500,000, covering 11 languages. The War Pictorial was deemed to have such a powerful effect on different masses that it could turn countries like China against Germany.

== Women ==
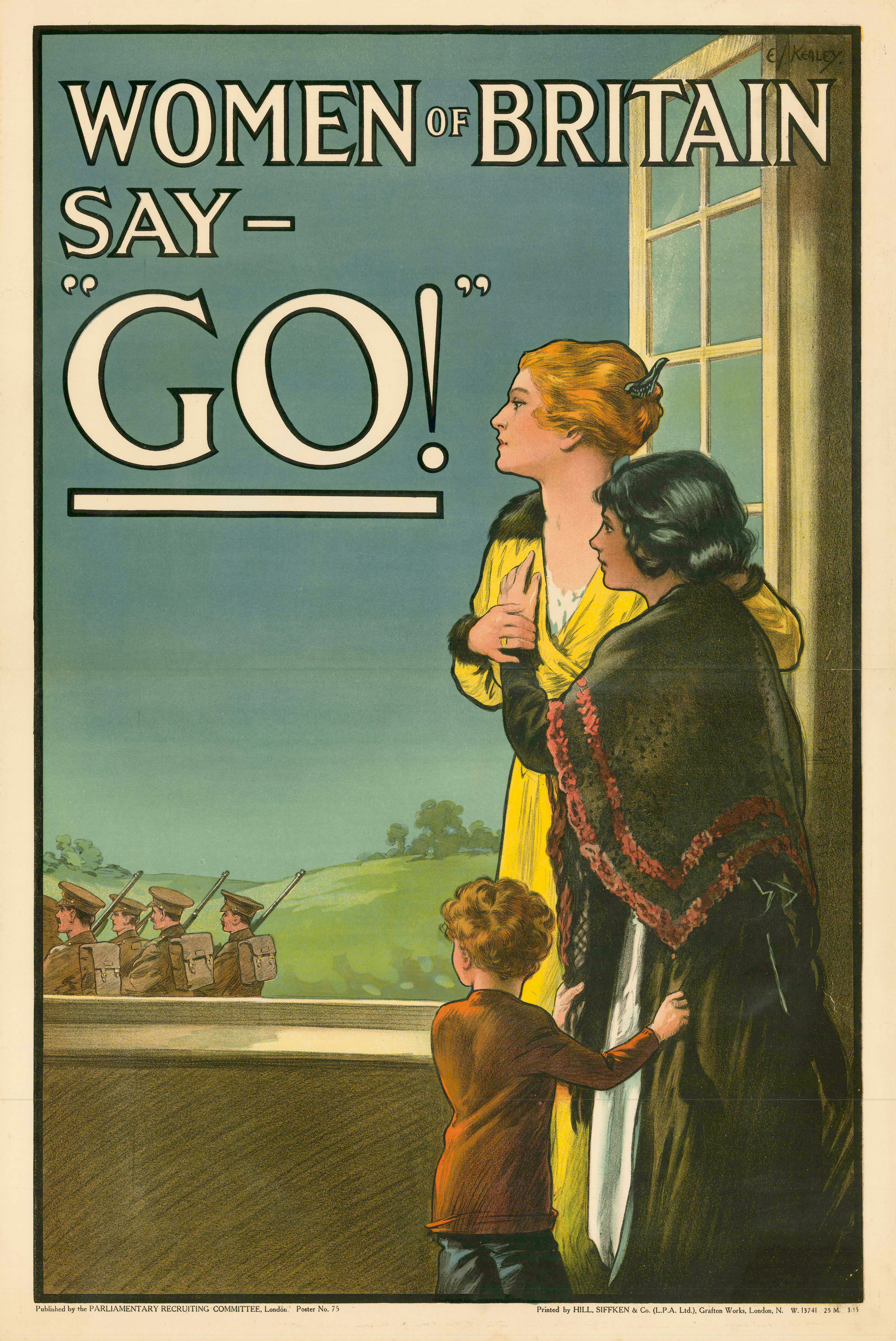
British propaganda poster depicting women as bravely seeing their men off to war

Propaganda and its ideological impacts on women and family life in the era differed by country. British propaganda often promoted the idea that women and their families were threatened by the enemy, particularly the German Army. British propaganda played on the fears of the country's citizens by depicting the German Army as a ravenous force that horrified towns and cities, raped women and tore families apart. The terror ensued by the gendered propaganda influenced Britain's war policies, and violence against the domestic sphere in wartime became seen as an inexcusable war crime.

In the Ottoman Empire, the United States, and other countries, women were encouraged to enter the workforce since the number of men kept shrinking during the war. The Ottoman government already had a system that incorporated the participation of women in governmental committees that had established in 1912 and 1913. Thus, when the war began, the government spread patriotic propaganda to women all over the empire through the women's committees. Propaganda encouraged women to enter the workforce, both to support the Empire and to become self-sufficient by state-sanctioned work that was specified for women.

American war propaganda often featured images of women but typically reflected traditional gender norms. While there was increasingly a call to employ women to replace the men who were at war, American propaganda also emphasized sexual morality. Women's clubs often produced attitudes against gambling and prostitution.

In wartime fiction published by magazines like McClure's, female characters were cast as either virtuous self-sacrificing homemakers sending the men to war or unethical and selfish women who were usually drunk and too wealthy to be restrained by social mores. McClure's Win-the-War Magazine included contributions from authors Porter Emerson Browne and Dana Gatlin, recognized by scholars for their sentimental style of writing propaganda fiction employing stereotyped female characters. Browne once said of melodramatic writing: "Don't be afraid of seasoning too highly, nor of cooking too fiercely. You can't do it." In Mary and Marie, Browne accuses Mary (and, by extension, her country) of sitting "idly by, selfish, self-satisfied... squandering vacuously in self-pander [all] her riches of honor and courage and dignity", and Marie's country "went to war to save her gentle soul from dishonor". The virtuous Marie is revered and saintly even though she has been savagely raped by the Germans and left for dead.

The "immoral woman" archetype also appears in Dana Gatlin's New York Stuff. Gatlin describes New York as "too engrossed with her materialistic provender, the things which can be judged in terms of dollars and cents, which can be bought and sold; the things which, in the destroyed or partially destroyed cities of Europe, the very hand of distraction has proved to be but ephemeral baubles after all". Even married women are a threat lurking within the Gemeinschaft when they act in ways that undermine that family structure. The "dangerous married woman" stereotype shows a woman trying to corrupt an innocent girl, a stereotype that appears in other novels. Stereotypes of corrupted femininity are presented in the wartime propaganda as a source of evil. Self-sacrificing women who hold down the home front and send "their men" to war are portrayed as the model for the dutiful wartime home maker and the heart of the Gemeinschaft.

== See also ==
- Causes of World War I
- Centre for the Study of the Causes of the War
- Home front during World War I
  - Wellington House, the common name for Britain's War Propaganda Bureau
- Opposition to World War I
