= Kantorowicz =

Kantorowicz, Kantrowitz or Kantorovich is a surname. Notable people with the surname include:

Kantorovich:

- Leonid Kantorovich (1912-1986), Soviet mathematician

Kantorowicz:

- Ernst Hartwig Kantorowicz, German historian, member of the George-Kreis (1895–1963)
- Hermann Kantorowicz, German jurist and civil lawyer (1877–1940)

Kantrowitz:

- Adrian Kantrowitz (1918–2008), American cardiac surgeon
- Arnie Kantrowitz (1940–2022), American writer and activist
- Arthur Kantrowitz (1913–2008), American scientist, engineer, and educator
- Melanie Kaye/Kantrowitz (1945–2018), American essayist, poet, activist and academic
