= British propaganda during World War I =

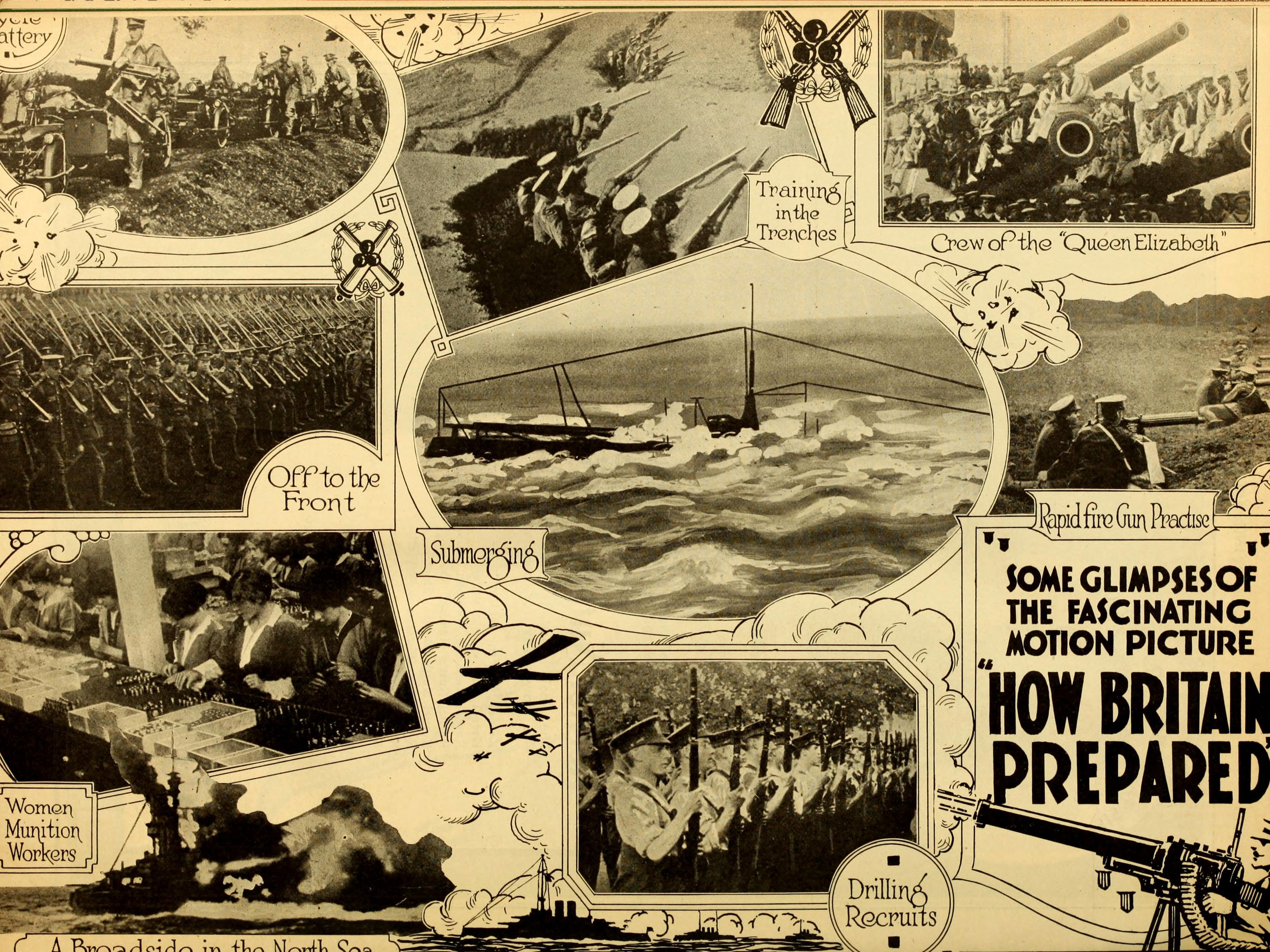
How Britain Prepared (1915 British film poster).

In the First World War, British propaganda took various forms, including pictures, literature and film. Britain also placed significant emphasis on atrocity propaganda as a way of mobilising public opinion against Imperial Germany and the Central Powers during the First World War. For the global picture, see Propaganda in World War I.

== History ==
At the start of the war various government departments began their own propaganda campaigns with no coordination among them. A major new organization was soon established at Wellington House under Charles Masterman. Nevertheless propaganda activities continued at the various agencies, with a lack of co-ordination. It was not until 1918 that activities were centralised under the Ministry of Information.

At the end of the war, almost all of the propaganda machinery was dismantled. There were various interwar debates regarding British use of propaganda, particularly atrocity propaganda. Commentators such as Arthur Ponsonby exposed many of the alleged atrocities as either lies or exaggerations, which led to a suspicion surrounding atrocity stories that caused a reluctance to believe the realities of Nazi Germany's persecution during World War II.

In Germany in the 1920s, former military leaders like Erich Ludendorff suggested that British propaganda had been instrumental in their defeat. Adolf Hitler echoed that view, and the Nazis later used many British propaganda techniques during their time in power, 1933-1945.

=== Organisation ===
Britain had no propaganda agencies in place at the start of the war, which led to what Sanders and Taylor termed "an impressive exercise in improvisation". Various organisations were established during the war, and several attempts at centralisation and greater co-ordination between the agencies occurred. By 1918, the attempts at centralisation were mostly fulfilled by the Ministry of Information.

==== Early agencies (1914–1915) ====
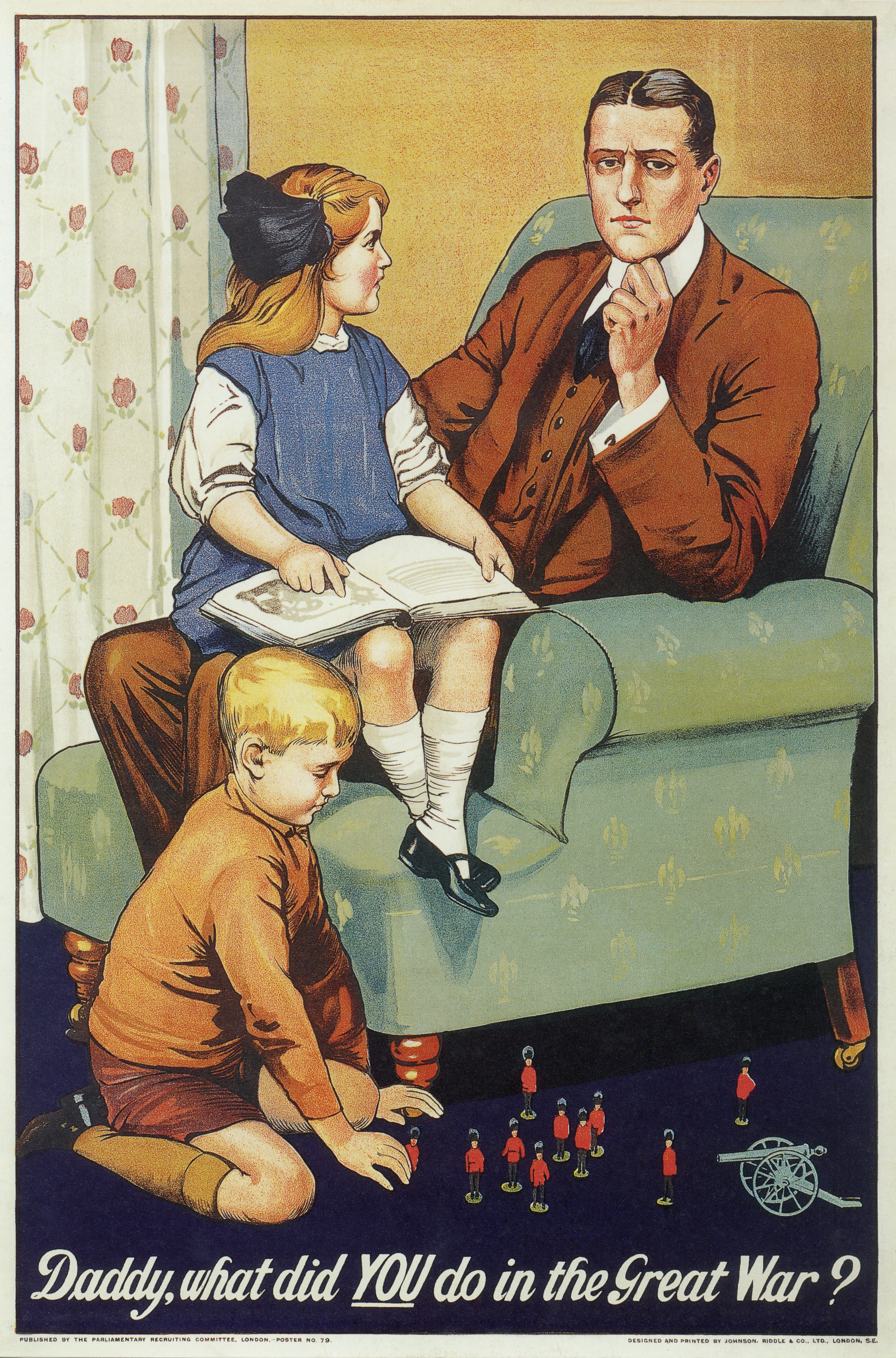
The poster "Daddy, what did you do in the Great War?" played on the guilt of those who did not volunteer.

The initial establishment of a propaganda agency was a response to the extensive propaganda activities of Germany. Masterman was chosen to head the new organisation, which was to be based at Wellington House, the London headquarters of the National Insurance Commission. After two conferences in September, the war propaganda agency began its work, which was largely conducted in secret and unknown by Parliament.

Until 1916, Wellington House was the main British propaganda organisation, and its work focused on propaganda to the United States although divisions existed for other countries. Wellington House had expanded significantly by the time of its second report in February 1916, with new departments and an increase in staff.

The Bureau began its propaganda campaign on 2 September 1914, when Masterman invited 25 leading British authors to Wellington House to discuss ways of best promoting Britain's interests during the war. Several of the writers agreed to write pamphlets and books that would promote the government's point of view.

Alongside Wellington House, two other organisations were established by the government to deal with propaganda. One was the Neutral Press Committee, which was given the task of supplying the press of neutral countries with information relating to the war and was headed by G. H. Mair, the former assistant editor of the Daily Chronicle. The other was the Foreign Office News Department, which served as the source for the foreign press of all official statements concerning British foreign policy.

During the beginning of the war, many voluntary amateur organisations and individuals also engaged in their own propaganda efforts, which occasionally resulted in tensions with Wellington House.

==== Foreign Office centralisation (1916) ====
A lack of coordination between the various organisations led to propaganda activities being centralised under the Foreign Office after a conference in 1916. The Neutral Press Committee was absorbed into the News Department, and Wellington House was placed under the control of the Foreign Office.

Only Masterman was resistant to the reorganisation; he feared the loss of independence that it implied. However, later criticism of the Foreign Office's control of propaganda emerged during the year, particularly from the War Office. After David Lloyd George, who had been instrumental in the establishment of Wellington House, became prime minister, the propaganda machinery was once more reorganised.

==== Propaganda under Lloyd George (1917) ====
In January 1917, Lloyd George asked Robert Donald, the editor of the Daily Chronicle, to produce a report on current propaganda arrangements. Donald's report was critical regarding the continued lack of co-ordination and asserted that "the condition into which publicity and propaganda work has drifted at the present time is due to the casual way in which it originated and to the promiscuous way it has expanded". However, Wellington House's activities in America were praised.

Immediately after the production of the report, the cabinet decided to implement its plan to establish a separate Department of State to be responsible for propaganda. Although not Donald's first choice, John Buchan was appointed head of this new organisation in February 1917. The department was housed at the Foreign Office, with the title of the Department of Information. However, the organisation was also criticised, and Donald argued for further reorganisation, an idea that was supported by other members of the advisory committee, such as Lords Northcliffe and Burnham. Buchan was temporarily placed under the command of Sir Edward Carson until another report was produced by Donald later that year.

The second report again highlighted a persistent lack of unity and co-ordination although this time, even Wellington House was rebuked for its inefficiency and haphazard nature of distribution. Both Masterman and Buchan answered the criticisms in the report by suggesting that the investigation behind it was limited in scope. Nevertheless, criticisms against the current propaganda system increased and following the resignation of Carson from the War Cabinet in 1918, it was decided that a new ministry should be created.

==== Ministry of Information (1918) ====
In February 1918, Lloyd George entrusted Lord Beaverbrook with the responsibility of establishing the new Ministry of Information. From 4 March 1918, the ministry took over control of all propaganda activities and was split into three departments to oversee domestic, foreign and military propaganda. The foreign propaganda division was under the headship of Buchan and consisted of four branches; propaganda in military zones was the responsibility of the War Office Department MI7; domestic propaganda was controlled by the National War Aims Committee (NWAC). A further organisation was set up under Northcliffe as the Department of Propaganda in Enemy Countries, and was responsible to the War Cabinet, rather than the Minister of Information.

The ministry was a fulfilment of the recommendations regarding centralisation laid out in Donald's second report. It acted as an independent body outside of the remit of the Foreign Office.

Nevertheless, there were still problems and criticisms related to the new ministry. Tensions existed between the new Ministry of Information and older ministries such as the Foreign Office and the War Office, and many in government were concerned about the growing power of the press, as symbolised by the journalistic control of the new propaganda ministry.

In October, Beaverbrook became seriously ill and his deputy, Arnold Bennett, assumed his position for the final weeks of the war. After the end of the war, the propaganda machinery was essentially dissolved, and control of propaganda returned to the Foreign Office.

== Methods ==
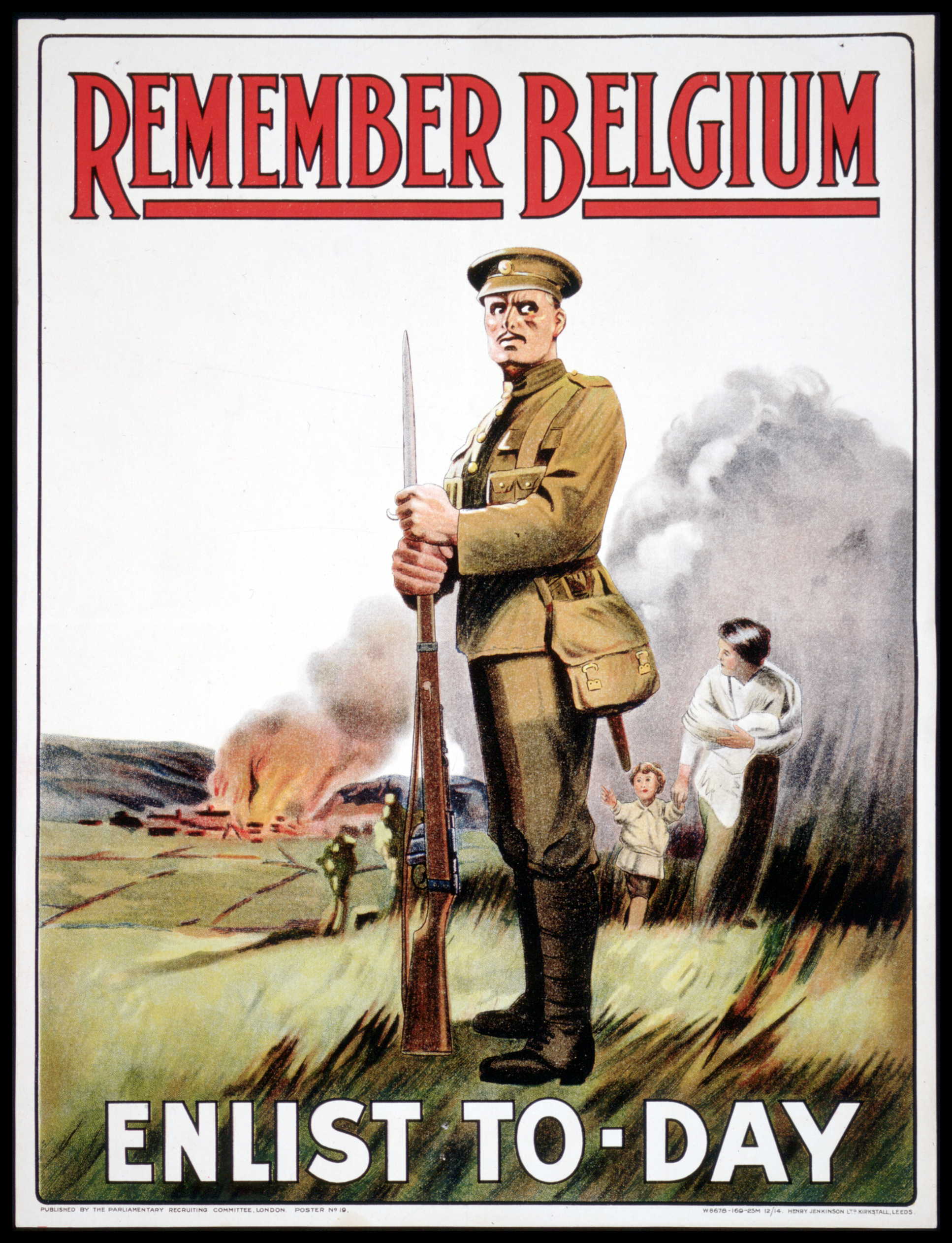
The Rape of Belgium was used in British propaganda

Various methods of propaganda were used by British propagandists during the war, the emphasis being the need for credibility.

=== Literature ===
Various written forms of propaganda were distributed by British agencies during the war. They could be books, leaflets, official publications, ministerial speeches or royal messages. They were targeted at influential individuals, such as journalists and politicians, rather than a mass audience.

Leaflets, the main form of propaganda in the first years of the war, were distributed to various foreign countries. The leaflets, academic in tone and factual in nature, were distributed through unofficial channels. By June 1915, 2.5 million copies of propagandistic documents had been circulated by Wellington House in various languages; eight months later, the figure had been 7 million.

Leaflet production was greatly reduced under the Ministry of Information to approximately a tenth of previous production. That was both a result in changing ideas on the most efficient methods of propaganda and a response to the paper shortage.

=== Media coverage ===
British propagandists also sought to influence the foreign press by providing it with information through the Neutral Press Committee and the Foreign Office. Special telegraph agencies were established in various European cities, including Bucharest, Bilbao and Amsterdam to facilitate the spread of information.

To supplement that activity, Wellington House produced illustrated newspapers, which were similar to the Illustrated London News and influenced by the German use of pictorial propaganda. Various language editions were distributed, including America Latina in Spanish, O Espelho in Portuguese, Hesperia in Greek and Cheng Pao in Chinese.

=== Film ===
British propagandists were slow in exploiting cinema as a form of propaganda. Wellington House had suggested its use soon after the war started, but that suggestion was overruled by the War Office. It was only in 1915 that Wellington House was permitted to implement its plans for film propaganda. A Cinema Committee was formed, which produced and distributed films to the Allies and to neutral countries.

The first notable film was Britain Prepared (December 1915), which was distributed worldwide. The film used military footage to promote ideas of British strength and determination in the war effort.

In August 1916, Wellington House produced the film Battle of the Somme, which was met favourably.

Britons: Lord Kitchener Wants You. Join Your Country's Army! God save the King.

=== Recruitment posters ===
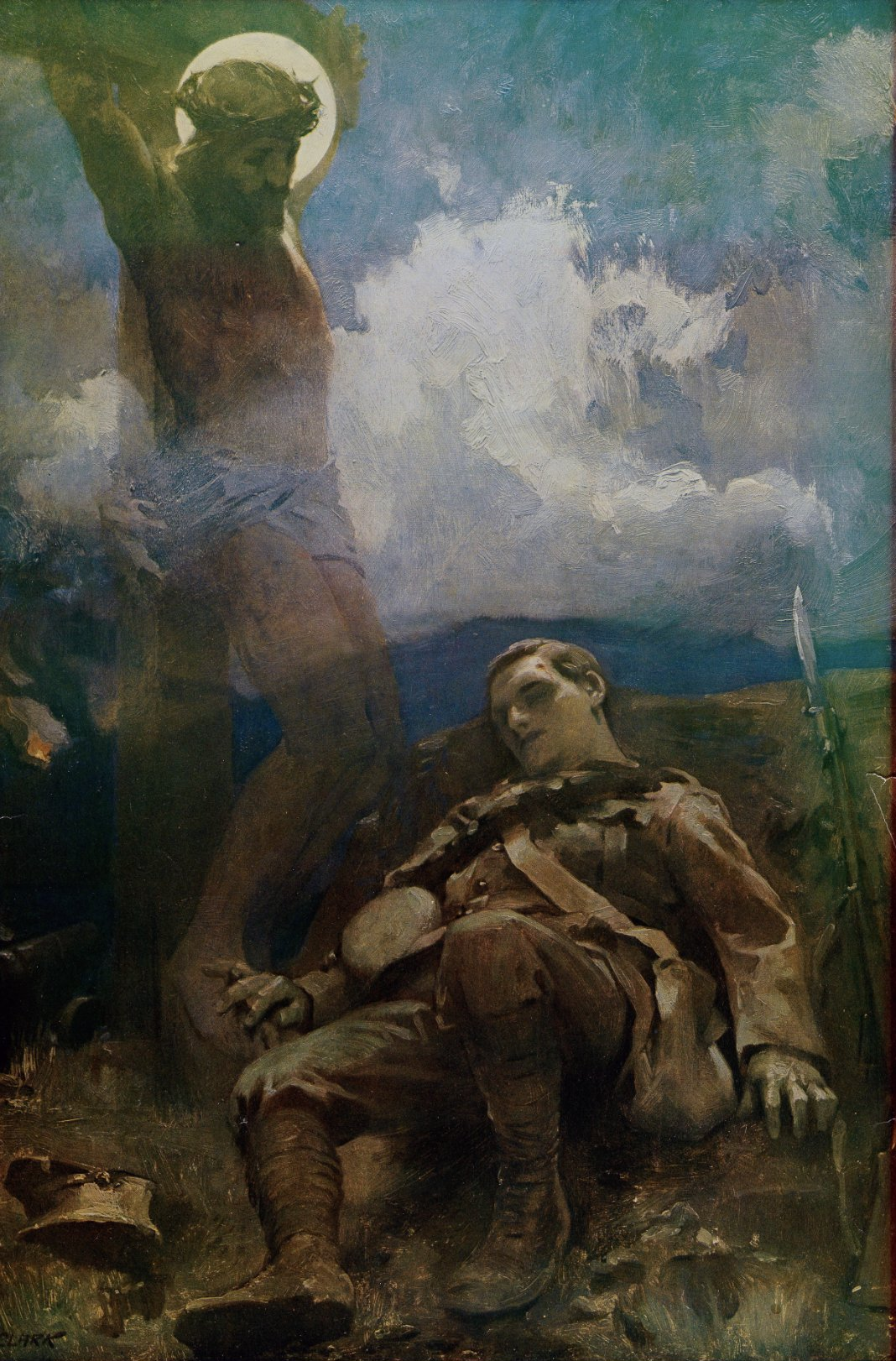
James Clark - The Great Sacrifice, 1914.

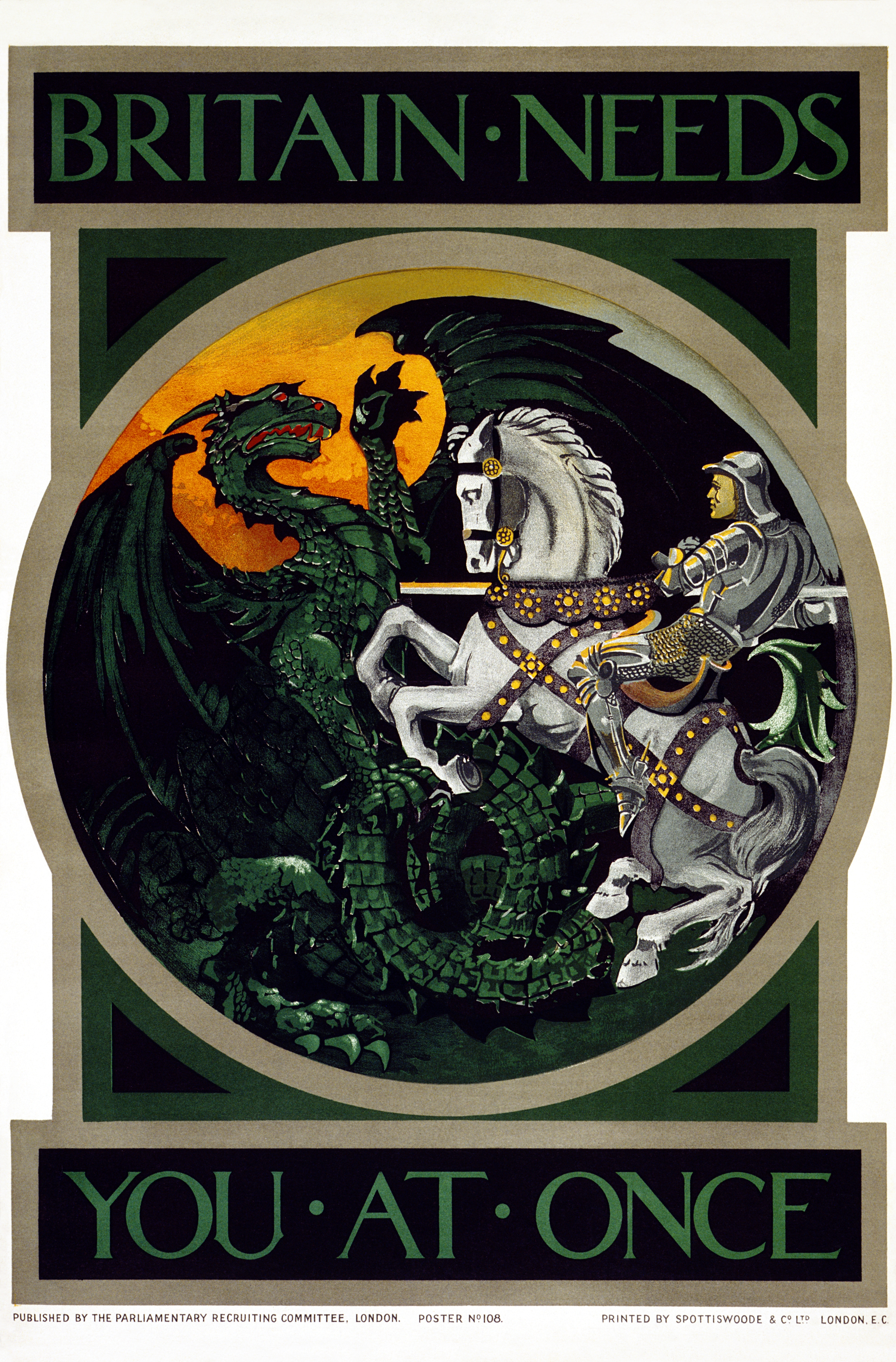
Poster by the Parliamentary Recruiting Committee, featuring St. George and the Dragon.

Recruitment was a central theme of domestic propaganda until the introduction of conscription in January 1916. The most common theme for recruitment posters was patriotism, which evolved into appeals for people to do their 'fair share'. Among the most famous of the posters used in the British Army's recruitment campaigns of the war were the "Lord Kitchener Wants You" posters, which depicted Secretary of State for War Lord Kitchener above the words "WANTS YOU".

Other concepts used on recruitment posters included the fear of invasion as well as atrocity stories. The "Remember Scarborough" campaign, recalling the 1914 attack on Scarborough, is an example of a recruitment poster combining those ideas.

=== Painting ===
James Clark's 1914 painting, The Great Sacrifice, was reproduced as the souvenir print issued by The Graphic, an illustrated newspaper, in its Christmas number. The painting depicted a young soldier lying dead on the battlefield beneath a vision of Christ on the Cross. It had an immediate appeal to many, and prints were snapped up by churches, schools and mission halls. One reviewer stated that the print had "turned railway bookstalls into wayside shrines". Framed copies were hung in churches next to Rolls of Honour, and clergymen gave sermons on the theme of the painting. The original oil painting was acquired by Queen Mary, the wife of King George V, but several other copies were made. Clark also painted The Bombardment of the Hartlepools (16 December 1914) (Hartlepool Art Gallery). Clark designed a number of war memorials and his painting was the basis for several memorial stained glass windows in churches. He executed the scheme of wall paintings in the nave of Holy Trinity Church, Casterton, Cumbria, between 1905 and 1912.

== Atrocity propaganda ==
Atrocity propaganda, which aimed to mobilise hatred of the German enemy by spreading details of German war crimes, whether real, exaggerated, or fabricated outright, was used extensively by Britain during the war and reached its peak in 1915, with much of the atrocities related to Germany's invasion of Belgium. Newspaper accounts of "Terrible Vengeance" first used the word "Hun" to describe the Germans in view of atrocities in Belgium. A continuous stream of stories ensued that painted the German people as destructive barbarians, but many of the reported atrocities were exaggerated or fictitious. The German Kaiser was often demonised in Allied propaganda. His pre-1898 image of a gallant but eccentric Victorian era gentleman was long gone, replaced by that of a dangerous international troublemaker in the pre-1914 era. During the war he became the personified incarnation of alleged German militarism and barbarism; by 1919 the British press was demanding his trial and execution for war crimes. He died in exile in 1941, by which time his former enemies had moderated their criticism and instead turned the hatred against Hitler's very real atrocities.

=== Bryce Report ===
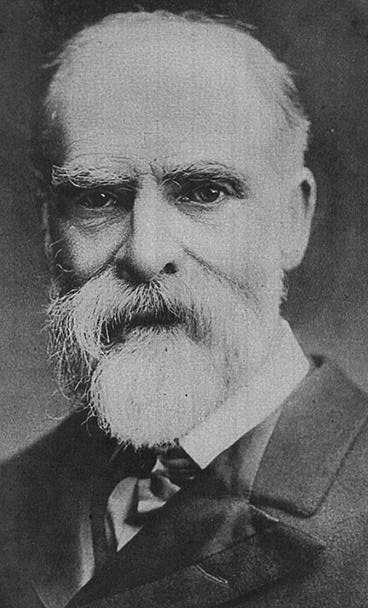
Lord Bryce

One of the most widely-disseminated documents of atrocity propaganda during the war was the Report of the Committee on Alleged German Outrages, or the Bryce Report, of May 1915. Based on 1,200 witness depositions, it depicted the systematic murder and violation of Belgians by German soldiers during the German invasion of Belgium, including details of rapes and the slaughter of children. Published by a committee of lawyers and historians, headed by a respected former ambassador, Lord Bryce, the report had a significant impact both in Britain and in America and made front-page headlines in major newspapers. It was also translated into 30 languages for distribution into Allied and neutral countries. Its impact in America was heightened by the fact that it was published soon after the sinking of the Lusitania. In response to the report, Germany published its own official response in the form of the 'White Book' (Die völkerrechtswidrige Führung des belgischen Volkskriegs "The Illegal Under International Law Leadership of the Belgian People's War"), which used fabricated evidence to justify atrocities by alleging that guerrilla warfare was being covertly backed by Allied intelligence services and fought by Belgian civilians against local units of the Imperial German Army. However, "The White Book" had an impact that was highly limited, apart from a few German-language publications; indeed, some interpreted it as an outright admission of guilt. Modern day research has generally supported the Bryce report as mostly accurate despite its propaganda role, and the White Book's allegations as false.

Other publications referring to the violation of Belgian neutrality were subsequently distributed in neutral countries. For example, Wellington House disseminated the pamphlet Belgium and Germany: Texts and Documents in 1915, which was written by Belgian Foreign Minister Davignon and featured details of alleged German war crimes.

=== Edith Cavell ===
Edith Cavell was an International Red Cross nurse in Brussels who was secretly involved in La Dame Blanche, a British Intelligence network that, among many other things, helped Allied prisoners-of-war and Belgian men of military age escape through the lines. Since engaging in any belligerent activity voided her protection as a Red Cross nurse, Cavell was court-martialed under German military law for Kriegsverrät (perfidy), found guilty and executed by firing squad in 1915. The story was spin doctored, however, into the cold-blooded murder of an innocent female humanitarian.

=== Lusitania medal ===
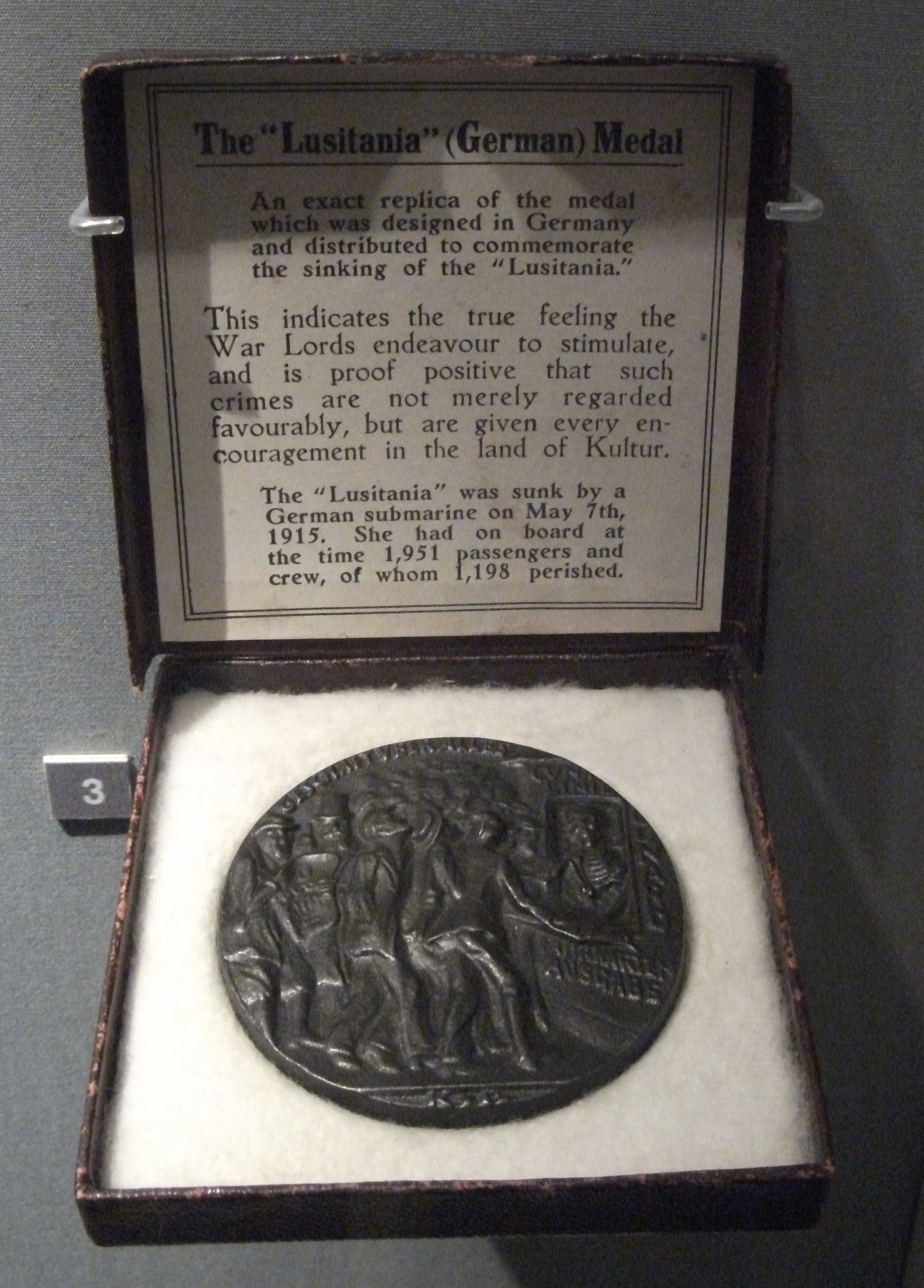
The Selfridge replica of the German medal by Goetz in its case

British propagandists were able to use the sinking of the Lusitania as atrocity propaganda because of a commemorative medal privately struck by German artist Karl Goetz a year later. The British Foreign Office obtained a copy of the medal and sent photographs of it to America. Later, to build on anti-German sentiment, a boxed replica was produced by Wellington House that was accompanied by a leaflet explaining the barbarism of Germany. Hundreds of thousands of replicas were produced in total, but Goetz's original had been made in an edition of fewer than 500. Another false story wide reported in the Northcliffe papers said that Germany used "corpse factories" to boil down the corpses of soldiers into lubricating oils and pig food.

== See also ==
- History of the United Kingdom during World War I
- John R. Rathom
- Wellington House
- British propaganda during World War II
- The Rape of Belgium
- Propaganda and censorship in Italy during the First World War

== Sources and further reading ==
- Bingham, Adrian. "The Daily Mail and the First World War" History Today (Dec 2013) 63#12 pp 1–8. It was a Northcliffe paper.
- Elkes, Pauline. "Review: Propaganda to Die for?" Journal of Contemporary History 36#4 (2001) pp. 673–680 online
- Gullace, Nicoletta F. "Allied Propaganda and World War I: Interwar Legacies, Media Studies, and the Politics of War Guilt" History Compass (Sept 2011) 9#9 pp 686–700
- Gullace, Nicoletta F. "Sexual violence and family honor: British propaganda and international law during the First World War," American Historical Review (1997) 102#3 714–747. online
- Haste, Cate (1977). Keep the Home Fires Burning: Propaganda in the First World War. London.
- Horne, John; Kramer, Alan (2001). German Atrocities, 1914: A History of Denial. London.
- Knightley, Phillip (2002). The First Casualty: The War Correspondent as Hero and Myth-Maker from the Crimea to Kosovo. Johns Hopkins University Press. ISBN 978-0-8018-6951-8.
- Messinger, Gary S. (1992). British Propaganda and the State in the First World War. New York. ISBN 0719030145.
- Moyer, Laurence V. (1995). Victory Must Be Ours: Germany in the Great War 1914–1918. New York: Hippocrene Books. ISBN 0-7818-0370-5.
- Ponsonby, Arthur (1928). Falsehood in War-Time: Propaganda Lies of the First World War. London: George Allen and Unwin.
- Sanders, M. L. (1975). "Wellington House and British propaganda during the First World War". The Historical Journal. 18 (1). Cambridge University Press: 119–146. doi:10.1017/S0018246X00008700. JSTOR 2638471. S2CID 159847468.
- Sanders, M. L.; Taylor, Philip M. (1982). British Propaganda During the First World War, 1914–18. London.
- Thompson, J. Lee (1999). "'To Tell the People of America the Truth': Lord Northcliffe in the US, Unofficial British Propaganda, June–November 1917". Journal of Contemporary History. 34 (2): 243–262. doi:10.1177/002200949903400205. S2CID 159927472.
- Thompson, J. Lee. Politicians, the Press, and Propaganda: Lord Northcliffe and the Great War, 1914-1919 (2000)
- Welch, David (2003). "Fakes". In Nicholas J. Cull, David H. Culbert and David Welch (ed.). Propaganda and Mass Persuasion: A Historical Encyclopaedia, 1500 to the Present. ABC-CLIO. pp. 123–124. ISBN 978-1-57607-820-4.
- White, William. "Lord Northcliffe and World War I." Journalism Quarterly 34.2 (1957): 208-216. He was intensely anti-German before and during the war.
- Wilson, Trevor (1979). "Lord Bryce's investigation into alleged German atrocities in Belgium, 1914–15". Journal of Contemporary History. 14 (3). Sage: 369–383. doi:10.1177/002200947901400301. JSTOR 260012. S2CID 159629719.
