= Serbian Blue Book =

Collection of 1914 Serbian documents

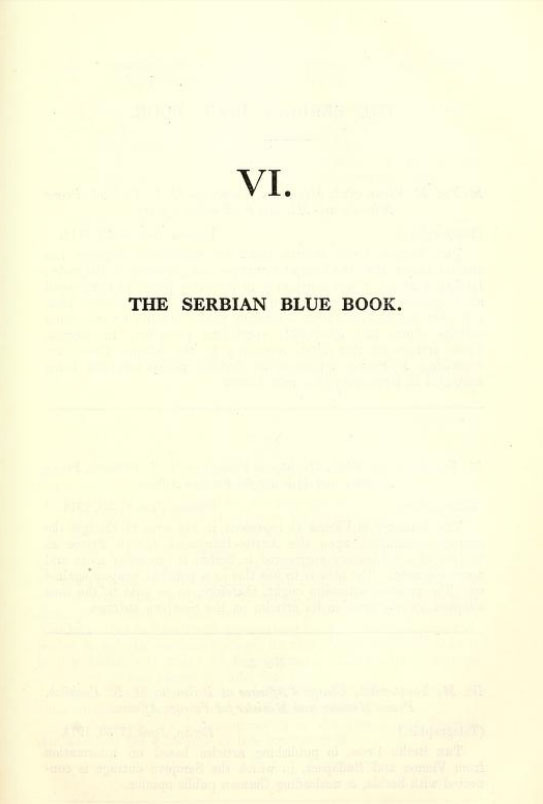
Chapter VI in Collected Diplomatic Documents Relating to the Outbreak of the European War (1915), the English translation of the "Serbian Blue Book".

The Serbian Blue Book is a collection of 52 Serbian diplomatic documents regarding events between 29 June and 6 August 1914, a period including the aftermath of the assassination of Archduke Ferdinand (the July Crisis) and the beginning of World War I, published by the Government of the Kingdom of Serbia on 18 November 1914. It includes correspondence between Serbian ministers and diplomats, Serbia and Russia (including royal), Austria-Hungary, and Germany. It was published in French translation in 1914, and English translation by the British Foreign Office in Collected Diplomatic Documents Relating to the Outbreak of the European War, and also American Association for International Conciliation, in 1915.

After the war, the Allied Commission used the book along with other diplomatic document collections to conclude the responsibility of the Central Powers in the war. According to Joseph Ward Swain, the 'purpose of the Serbian blue book was to show the aggressive spirit of the Austrians'.

== See also ==
- Serbian Campaign of World War I
- Austro-Hungarian Red Book
- Belgian Grey Book
- Color books
- French Yellow Book
- German White Book
- British Blue Book
- Russian Orange Book

== Sources ==
- "The Serbian Blue Book". Collected Diplomatic Documents Relating to the Outbreak of the European War. London. 1915. pp. 369–398.
- James Brown Scott (1916). Diplomatic Documents Relating to the Outbreak of the European War. Oxford University Press, American branch.
- The Times documentary history of the war. Times Publishing Company. 1917.
- New York Public Library (1917). Diplomatic History of the European War: A List of References in the New York Public Library. Public Library. pp. 13–.
- "The Serbian Blue Book (1914)". World War I Document Archive; Rastko. 2007.
