= William Warwick Buckland =

British scholar of Roman law (1859–1946)

Buckland in c1932.

William Warwick Buckland, FBA (11 June 1859 – 16 January 1946) was a scholar of Roman law, Regius Professor of Civil Law at the University of Cambridge from 1914 to 1945.

== Life ==
William Warwick Buckland was educated in France, at Hurstpierpoint College and the Crystal Palace School of Engineering. He entered Gonville and Caius College, Cambridge in 1881, graduating in 1884 with a first in the Law Tripos. Elected a Fellow of Caius, he remained a Cambridge academic for the remainder of his life. In 1920 he became a Fellow of the British Academy. He received honorary degrees from the universities of Oxford, Edinburgh (1922), Harvard (1929), Lyon, Louvain and Paris. Among his best-known works on Roman law is A Textbook of Roman Law from Augustus to Justinian, which became a standard text.

He is buried at the Parish of the Ascension Burial Ground in Cambridge.

== Works ==
- The Roman Law of Slavery: The Conditions of the Slave in Private Law from Augustus to Justinian (Cambridge: University Press, 1908)
- Equity in Roman Law: Lectures Delivered in the University of London, at the Request of the Faculty of Laws (London: University of London Press, 1911)
- Elementary Principles of Roman Private Law (Cambridge: University Press, 1912)
- A Textbook of Roman Law from Augustus to Justinian. Cambridge: University Press. 1921 – via Internet Archive.
- A Manual of Roman Private Law (Cambridge: University Press, 1925)
- The Main Institutions of Roman Private Law (Cambridge: University Press, 1931)
- Roman Law and Common Law: A Comparison in Outline (Cambridge: University Press, 1936) (with the collaboration of Arnold D. McNair)
- Studies in the Glossators of the Roman Law: Newly Discovered Writings of the Twelfth Century (Cambridge: University Press, 1938) (edited and explained by Hermann F. Kantorowicz with the collaboration of W.W. Buckland)
- Some Reflections on Jurisprudence. Cambridge: Cambridge University Press. 1945. ISBN 9780208014078.
