= Hermann Kantorowicz =

German jurist (1877–1940)

Hermann Ulrich Kantorowicz (18 November 1877 in Posen, German Empire – 12 February 1940 in Cambridge) was a German jurist.

He was a professor at Freiburg University (1923-1929), and a visiting professor, Columbia University (1927), as well as at Kiel University (1929-1933). He was dismissed from Kiel on political and antisemitic grounds in 1933, and became lecturer at the 'University in Exile' and at City College, New York, 1933–34. Then he was lecturer at the London School of Economics, All Souls College Oxford and Cambridge University, 1934–37, and Assistant Director of Research in Law, Cambridge, 1937-1940.

== Report on German war guilt issue ==
Kantorowicz caused heated debate when details of his report for the parliamentary investigative committee on the question of Germany's guilt in triggering World War I became known. Contrary to the prevailing opinion in Germany, he concluded in 1923 that Germany's responsibility in the outbreak of the war was of great importance. Kantorowicz cited as an example the official German White Book of 3 August 1914, finding that about 75 percent of the documents that it presented had been falsified to support denial of Germany's involvement in the outbreak of the First World War.

When Kantorowicz was proposed for election as a full professor at the University of Kiel shortly thereafter in 1927, Foreign Minister Gustav Stresemann (DVP) raised his objections to this in a letter to the Minister of Culture Carl Heinrich Becker (SPD). Stresemann saw Germany as innocent of the origins of the First World War and, after advice from the former diplomat and politician Johannes Kriege (DVP), wanted to prevent Kantorowicz's critical view of Germany's actions, which went as far as "masochism", from being reinforced by the award of a full professorship in Kiel.

== Selected works ==
A comprehensive bibliography can be found in Relativismus und Freirecht, ein Versuch űber Hermann Kantorowicz by Karlheinz Muscheler, C. F. Müller Juristicher Verlag, Heidelberg, 1984

- Aesthetik der Lyrik. Das Georgesche Gedicht, with Heinrich Goesch, 1902, under pseudonym of 'Kuno Zwymann'.
- Goblers Karolinen-Kommentar und seine Nachfolger, 1904
- Der Kampf um die Rechtswissenschaft, under pseudonym of Gnaeus Flavius), 1906#
- Una festa bolognese per l'Epifania del 1289, 1906
- Schriftvergleichung und Urkundenfälschung, 1906
- Cino da Pistoja ed il primo trattato di medicina legale, 1906##
- Probleme der Strafrechtsvergleichung, 1907
- Albertus Gandinus und das Strafrecht der Scholastik, Erster Band: Die Praxis, 1907
- Die Freiheit des Richters bei der Strafzumessung, 1908
- Zur Lehre vom richtigen Recht, 1909
- Über die Entstehung der Digestenvulgata, 1910
- Die contra-legem-Fabel, 1910
- Der Strafgesetzentwurf und die Wissenschaft, 1910/11
- Rechtswissenschaft und Soziologie, 1911#
- Was ist uns Savigny?,1912##
- Volksgeist und historische Rechtsschule, 1912##
- Wider die Todesstrafe, 1912
- Max Conrat(Cohn) und die mediävistische Forschung, 1912
- Ausgabe von Max Conrats Schrift, Römisches Recht im frühesten Mittelalter, 1913
- Zu den Quellen des Schwabenspiegels, 1913##
- Die Epochen Der Rechtswissenschaft, 1914##
- Der Offiziershass im deutschen Heer, 1919
- Thomas Diplovatatius. De claris juris consultis. Bd. 1, with Fritz Schulz, 1919.
- Der Umsturz in Pesaro 1516, 1919
- Deutschlands Interesse am Völkerbund, 1920
- Staatsbürgerkunde als Unterrichtsfach, 1920
- Die Zukunft des strafrechtlichen Unterrichts, 1920
- Einführung in die Textkritik, 1921##
- Bismarcks Schatten* , 1921
- Hinter den Kulissen von Versailles, 1921
- Geschichte des Gandinustextes, 1. Teil, 1921
- Verteidigung des Völkersbundes. 1922
- Der italienische Strafgsetzentwurf und seine Lehre, 1922
- Notiz über Max Weber in Logos XI, 1922#
- Das Principium Decretalium des Johannes de Deo, 1922
- Geschichte des Gandinustextes, 2. Teil, 1922
- Der Völkerbund im Jahre 1922
- Der Aufbau der Soziologie in Erinnerungsgabe für Max Weber, 1923#
- Die Idee des Völkerbundes, 1923
- Should Germany join the League of Nations? in Foreign Affairs, 1924
- Germany and the League of Nations, lecture to Fabian Society, 1924
- Leben und Schriften des Albertus Gandinus, 1924
- Studien zum altitalienischen Strafprozeß. I. Bologneser Strafprozeßordnung von 1288; II. Der Tractatus de tormentis, 1924##
- Fechenbachurteil und Kriegsschuldfrage, 1925
- Studien zur Kriegsschuldfrage, 1925
- Pazifismus und Fascismus, 1925
- Savigny-Briefe, 1925
- Staatsauffassungen. Eine Skizze, 1925#
- Il 'Tractatus criminum, per il cinquantenario della Rivista Penale, Citta di Castello, 1925##
- Aus der Vorgeschichte der Freirechtslehre, 1925#
- Albertus Gndinus und der Strafrecht der Scholastik, 2. Band, 1926
- Die Irrationalität der englischen Politik, 1926
- Der Landesverrat im deutschen Strafrecht, 1926/27
- The New Germanic Constitution in Theory and Practice, 1927
- Damasus, 1927
- Naber zum Brachylogus, 1927
- Ein vergessener Tatbestand: die Kriegshetze, 1927/28
- Die Wahrheit über Sarajevo, 1928
- Legal Science. A summary of its methodology, 1928#
- Verfolgungseifer, 1928/29
- Die Sterilisierung von Minderwertigen in den Vereinigten Staaten, 1929
- Grundbegriffe der Literaturgeschichte, 1929##
- Kritische Studien zur Quellen- und Literatur- geschichte des röm. Rechts im Mittelalter, 1929
- Accursio e la sua biblioteca, 1929
- Nochmals Sarajevo, 1929
- Der Geist der englischen Politik u. d. Gespenst der Einkreisung Deutschlands, 1929
- Eine Gesamtausgabe des Pillius in Vorbereitung, 1930
- English Politics through German Eyes, 1930
- Praestantia Doctorum in Festschrift für Max Poppenheim, 1931##
- The Spirit of British Policy and the Myth of the Encirclement of Germany. Translated by Walter Henry Johnston. London: Allen & Unwin. 1931 – via Internet Archive.
- Trauerrede auf Julius Landmann, 1932
- The Concept of the State, 1932
- Die Allegationen im späten Mittelalter, 1932##
- Savignys Marburger Methodenlehre, 1933##
- De ornatu Mulierum, 1933##
- Tat und Schuld, 1933
- Current Misunderstandings of Hitlerism, under pseudonym of 'Cassander', 1933
- Some Rationalism about Realism, 1934#
- Baldus de Ubaldis and the subjective theory of guilt, 1934##
- Rapport sur les Sources du Droit, 1934
- Dictatorships, with bibliography by Alexander Elkin, 1935
- Kantorowicz, Hermann (1937). "A medieval grammarian on the sources of the law". Tijdschrift voor Rechtsgeschiedenis. 15 (1): 25–47. doi:10.1163/157181937X00026. ISSN 1571-8190.
- Savigny and the Historical School of Law, 1937##
- Les origines françaises des Exceptiones Petri, 1937##
- De Pugna. La letteratura longobardistica sul duello giudiziario, 1938##
- Has Capitalism failed in Law?, 1835-1935, 1938
- De Pugna. La Letteratura Longobardistica sul Duello Giudiziario, 1938##
- Les origines françaises des Exceptiones Petri, 1938##
- The Poetical Sermon of a Medieval Jurist, 1938##
- Studies in the Glossators of the Roman Law. 1938 – via Internet Archive. with W. W. Buckland
- The Quaestiones disputatae of the Glossators, 1939##

(Posthumous publications)

- Bractonian Problems, 1941
- An English Theologian's view of Roman Law, with Beryl Smalley, ed. Nicolai Rubinstein, 1941##
- A Greek Justinian Constitution, quoted in the Dissensiones Dominorum, 1945##
- A. H. Campbell, ed. (1958). The Definition of Law, with introduction by Arthur Goodhart. Cambridge University Press – via Internet Archive.Also translated into Italian, La Definizione del Diritto, trans. Enrico di Robilant, 1962; into German, Der Begriff des Rechts, trans. Werner Goldschmidt and Gerd Kastendieck, 1963; into Spanish, La Definícón del Derecho, trans. J.M. de la Vego, 1964
- Gutachten zur Kriegsschuldfrage 1914, edited with an introduction by Imanuel Geiss, 1967
- Diplovatatius 2. Band, edited by Giuseppe Rabotti, 1968

=== Collected small writings ===
At the instigation of his widow, Hilda Kantorowicz (1892-1974), the more significant small writings of Hermann Kantorowicz were published in the two following works. These writings are marked with '#' or '##' respectively in the above bibliography

- Rechtswissenschaft und Soziologie: ausgewählte Schriften zur Wissenschaftslehre, edited by Thomas Würtenberger, Verlag C. F. Müller, Karlsruhe, 1962
- Rechtshistorische Schriften, selected and edited by Helmut Coing and Gerhard Immel, Verlag C. F. Müller, Karlsruhe, 1970
