= The German White Book =

WWI publications by German government

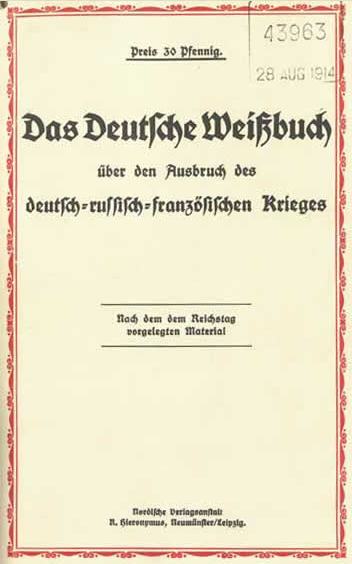
cover from The National Archives (United Kingdom)

The German White Book (German: Das Deutsche Weißbuch) was a series of propaganda publications made by the German Empire during WWI. The full title of the 1914 version was "The German White Book about the outbreak of the German-Russian-French war" and documents German claims on the causes of the war. (Note: German title: Das Deutsche Weißbuch über den Ausbruch des deutsch-russisch-französischen Krieges) An authorized English translation appeared in 1914. The book contained extracts of diplomatic material intended to portray the war's cause as defensive on the part of Germany. A second White Book, "The conduct of the Belgian People's War in violation of international law" (Note: German title: Die völkerrechtswidrige Führung des belgischen Volkskriegs) was published on 10 May 1915 in response to the Bryce committee report into German atrocities in Belgium, though it was already in preparation eight months earlier. This book featured manipulated testimony intended to show that German actions were the result of Belgian guerilla warfare. It was not found convincing by most outside readers though it found a second life with revisionists after the war.

Other combatants in the war published similar books: The Blue Book of Britain, The Orange Book of Russia, and the Yellow Book of France.

The 1914 book comprised two sections:

- "How Russia and Her Ruler Betrayed Germany's Confidence and Thereby Caused the European War"
- "How the German-Franco Conflict Might have been Avoided"

and an Appendix with communications between Prince Lichnowsky and Sir Edward Grey.

In a report for the parliamentary investigative committee on the question of Germany's guilt in triggering World War I, Hermann Kantorowicz examined the White Book and reported that about 75 percent of the documents presented in it were falsified, with the goal of denying Germany's responsibility for the outbreak of World War I.

== See also ==
- Centre for the Study of the Causes of the War
- Color books
- German entry into World War I
- Propaganda in World War I
- Causes of World War I

== Works cited ==
- Kantorowicz, Hermann; Geiss, Imanuel (1967). Gutachten zur Kriegsschuldfrage 1914 [Report on the War guilt question 1914] (in German). Frankfurt: Europäische Verlagsanstalt. OCLC 654661194.
- Kempe, Hans (2008). Der Vertrag von Versailles und seine Folgen: Propagandakrieg gegen Deutschland [The Treaty of Versailles and its Consequences: Propaganda War against Germany]. Vaterländischen Schriften (in German). Vol. 7 Kriegschuldlüge 1919 [War Guilt Lies 1919]. Mannheim: Reinhard Welz Vermittler Verlag e.K. ISBN 978-3-938622-16-2.
