= Schücking =

Schücking is a surname. Notable people with the name include:

- Beate Schücking (born 1956), German professor of Health Science and Psychosocial Medicine
- Engelbert Schücking (1926–2015), American-German physicist
- Heffa Schücking (born 1959), German biologist and environmentalist
- Katharina Sibylla Schücking (1791–1831), German poet
- Levin Schücking (1814–1883), German novelist
- Levin Ludwig Schücking (1878–1064), German scholar of the English language and English literature
- Norbert Schücking (born 1921), German flying ace
- Paulus Modestus Schücking (1787–1867), German lawyer, councillor, philosopher and writer
- Walther Schücking (1875–1935), German liberal politician, professor of public international law and the first German judge at the Permanent Court of International Justice in The Hague
