= Katharina Sibylla Schücking =

German poet (1791–1831)

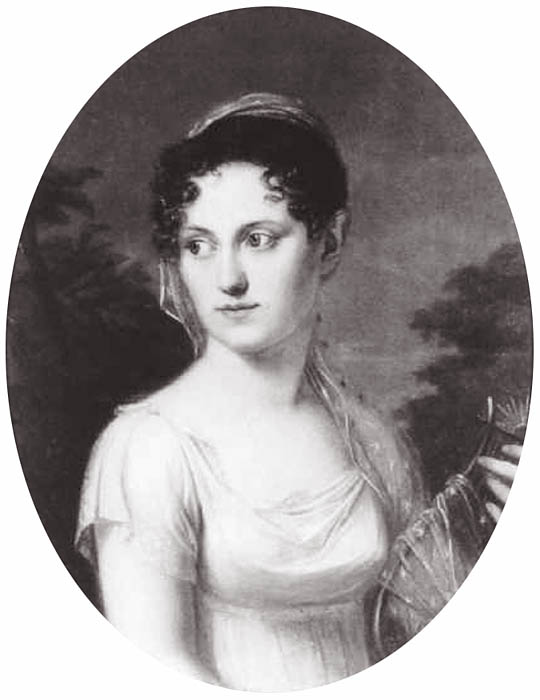
Katharina Sibylla Schücking by Johann Christoph Rincklake

Katharina Sibylla Schücking (née Busch; 26 January 1791, Ahlen – 2 November 1831, Ludmillenhof, Sögel, near Meppen) was a German poet from Westphalia.

== Life ==
She was the eldest of Elisabeth Busch (née Elverfeldt)'s twelve children with her husband, magistrate Ignatz Anton Busch (a Stadtrichter and Landrichter). She grew up in Dülmen and was educated at Agnetenberg abbey. She spent 1807 to 1809 in Münster, where her literary talent was recognised and encouraged by Anton Matthias Sprickmann and where she also joined the circle of Adelheid Amalie Gallitzin. She returned to Dülmen in 1809.

She first published her poetry in 1810, in Friedrich Raßmann's Mimigardia. She had asked for the poems to be published anonymously, but the publisher did not respect her wishes and her name and residence were appended to them. This led to her being scorned and ridiculed but did not do permanent damage to her reputation as a poet – in 1813 she first met Annette von Droste-Hülshoff, becoming a close friend and thinking of her as her "poetic idol". Droste later dedicated her poem Catharine Schücking to her. Schücking later wrote under the pseudonym "Pauline zu Cl."

In 1813, she married Paulus Modestus Schücking. The couple had six children: Christoph Bernhard Levin Matthias (1814–1883); Peter August Gerhard (1816–1817); Anton Matthias Franz Alfred (1818–1898); Ida Josephina Theophania Desideria (1821–1883); Modesta Paulina Nicolaia Roswitha (1825–1896); and Prosper Ludwig (1828–1887). In 1815, the Schücking family moved to Sögel, leaving Katharina socially and geographically isolated and bringing her writing to a standstill.

== Works ==
=== Letters ===
- Briefe an Anton Mathias Sprickmann, in: Groß, 1885, Bd. 1, S. 216f.
- Briefe an Annette von Droste-Hülshoff, in: K. Schulte Kemminghausen: Ein schicksalhafter Brief. Zum 150. Geburtstag Levin Schückings, in: Westf. Nachrichten, Nr. 206 vom 5. September 1964.

== Sources ==
- (in German) K. Weber: Katharina Schücking. Ein Erziehungs- und Lebensbild aus dem Anfang des neunzehnten Jahrhunderts. Diss. Münster 1918 [handschr.] (ULB Münster).
- (in German) Levin Schücking: Lebenserinnerungen. 2 Bde. Breslau 1886 – zahlr. Erwähnungen in der Literatur über Annette von Droste-Hülshoff, z.B. in Darstellungen von Elise von Hohenhausen und Elise Rüdiger.
