= Walther Schücking =

German lawyer and politician (1875–1935)

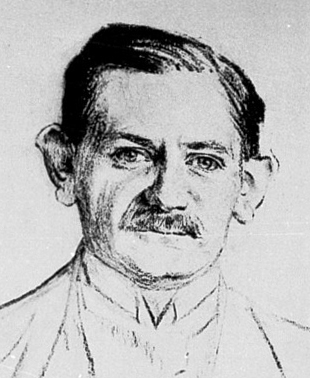
Walther Schücking 1903–1920 (charcoal drawing by Karl Doerbecker)

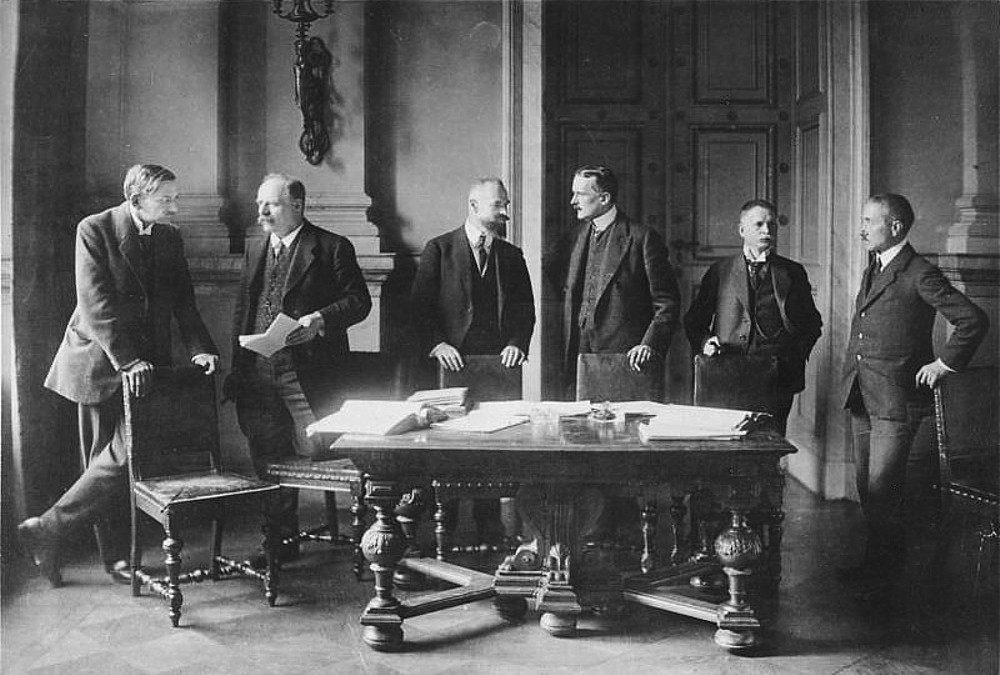
Walther Schücking and the other German delegates to the Paris Peace Conference, first from left

Walther Adrian Schücking (6 January 1875 – 25 August 1935) was a German liberal politician, professor of public international law and the first German judge at the Permanent Court of International Justice in The Hague.

== Early life ==
Schücking was born in Münster, Westphalia, Prussia, on 6 January 1875 to the district judge Carl Lothar Levin Schücking and his wife Luise Wilhelmine Amalie Beitzke (daughter of the politician and historian Heinrich Beitzke). His grandfather was the German novelist Levin Schücking (1814–1883). His brothers were Levin Ludwig Schücking (1878–1964), professor of English at the University of Leipzig, and Lothar Engelbert Schücking (1873–1943), lawyer, author and mayor of Husum. Schücking was married to Irmgard Auguste Charlotte Marte von Laer (1881–1952).

== Career ==
In 1913–14 Walter Schücking was a member of the international commission sent by the Carnegie Endowment for International Peace to investigate the conduct of the Balkan Wars of 1912–13. He co-authored its report.

He was a German delegate to the International union of Hague conference, and one of the six German delegates to the Paris Peace Conference to whom the Allies presented the draft Treaty of Versailles. As a member of the Weimar National Assembly and then the Reichstag from 1919 to 1928, he was the second chairman of the parliamentary inquiry into the question of guilt for the First World War. As a judge on the Permanent Court of International Justice, Schücking issued an important separate opinion on the Oscar Chinn Case in which he contributed to the theory of the Peremptory norm in international law. Schücking also advocated for recognizing China as an equal member of the international community, and in the 1920s served as a consultant for its government in the attempt to repeal foreign extraterritoriality. Schücking was also notable as one of the earliest consistent advocates in international law for a Weltstaatenbund, or permanent international organization of states.

Walther Schücking was nominated for the Nobel Peace Prize in 1918, 1919, 1920 and 1928, 1929, 1930, 1931, 1932, 1933, 1934.

He died in 1935 in The Hague. In 1995, the Institute of International Law at the University of Kiel was renamed the Walther Schücking Institute of International Law in his honor.
