= Friedrich Raßmann =

German writer and editor

Friedrich Raßmann (3 May 1772 - 9 April 1831) was a prolific German writer, editor and producer of newspapers and journals. He can also plausibly be seen as an anthologist, an encyclopaedist and a bibliographer.

== Life ==
=== Provenance and early years ===
(Christian) Friedrich Raßmann was born at Schloss Wernigerode ("Wernigerode Castle" -) subsequently rebuilt and completely changed), roughly equidistant between Hannover and Leipzig. The family were living at the castle because Heinrich Ernst Raßmann, the father of Friedrich, was employed at the time by Count Henry Ernest of Stolberg-Wernigerode who had inherited the services of the castle librarian, along with the family lands in and around Wernigerode on the death of his father the previous year. Sources - including at least one of Friedrich's own later poems - indicate that the librarian's son enjoyed a peaceful and happy childhood living at the castle. His first teacher was his father who before becoming a court librarian had worked as a school master and, at one stage, as a school "Rektor" ("head teacher"). He attended the local school in Wernigerode and then moved on to the "Martinischule" (as it was then known) in nearby Halberstadt. That was followed by three years at the University of Halle where between 1791 and 1794 Friedrich Raßmann studied Theology. He now became a candidate for ordination, and worked for a further three years, till 1797 as a volunteer teacher at his old school in Halberstadt, where he subsequently took a paid teaching post. In 1800, in a move that at least one openly incredulous commentator finds inexplicable, given his economic circumstances, he abandoned his teaching job and resolved to live by writing alone.

=== Poetry and ambition ===
Friedrich acquired a love of poetry from his father while still a boy. According to one source by the time he was 18 his own poems were being published. Elsewhere it is recorded that he was writing poems while still at secondary school, periodically gathering his output in a newssheet under the title "Unterhaltende Blätter" ("Entertaining Pages") which he circulated among his fellow pupils. He was 18 in 1790 when a poem of his was first printed. Inspired by the death of a contemporary, it was printed in Halberstadt and entitled "Eine Blume auf das Grab des besten Jünglings" (loosely, "A Flower on the grave of the best young man"). Between 1795 and 1797 a succession of further quite short poems were printed singly. Alongside these, in 1795 a small collection of his poems was printed in Halberstadt. The next year another collection was printed in Braunschweig, then as now a more substantial town, to the north-west. More followed. It was also during this period that he came to know Klamer Schmidt and Ludwig Gleim, two eminent local poets. Gleim, in particular, became briefly a valued mentor: evidence of the friendship survives in the form of the correspondence between them when Raßmann was out of town. In the words of one source, however, neither of these kindly men was able to provide for him the more productive life that he evidently craved. (Gleim was already an old man, and died in 1803).

=== Editorships ===
In 1803 he took over the editorship of two Halberstadt newspapers that had been founded by J.M.Lewian, a local Jewish businessman. One of these was the "Neuen Anzeigen vom Nützlichen, Angenehmen und Schönen", which he relaunched in 1804 with a shorter title as the "Neuen Anzeigen der Merkwürdigkeiten". The other was the "Allgemeinen Anzeigen der Merkwürdigkeiten", and he left this title unchanged. Raßmann edited both publications till the end of 1804. Alongside his editorial duties he found time to work as a "corrector" for the Döllschen Book Printing company, also in Halberstadt. It was on the recommendation of Karl Spazier that Friedrich Raßmann moved to Münster, which in the context of the war had been under Prussian occupation since 1802. (The city came under the control of a French puppet state early in 1806.) Raßmann arrived in Münster and immediately took on the editorship of "Merkur", a journal published by Friedrich Theodor Schmölder. In February 1806 "Merkur" ceased publication. It is known from his correspondence that Friedrich Raßmann very frequently found himself short of money, especially during the war years: following the collapse of "Merkur" he was able to find work as a private tutor. The appearance of French troops on the city streets in the aftermath of the French military victory at Austerlitz, meant there was suddenly plenty of work for tutors of both German and French: it turned out that Raßmann was competent in both. During the decades that followed he increasingly supported himself through freelance writing work in German. The poetry also continued to flow.

=== Ten more years of war and austerity ===
By this time he had a family to support, and the decade from 1806 was particularly difficult in financial terms, while his poetry and correspondence from the time give every indication that the family sometimes went short of bread and that he was becoming depressed. He was working feverishly but still desperately short of money. His father's death, right at the end of 1812 caused him intense grief, even it brought some practical relief in terms of a small inheritance. That was soon spent, however. There were two major newspaper projects: "Eos, Zeitschrift für Gebildete" ("Eos, newspaper for the educated") had its launch in Münster in 1810 and was evidently short-lived. "Thusnelda. Unterhaltungsblatt für Deutsche" ("...entertainment pages for Germans") appeared in Coesfeld in 1816 and continued with a shortened name in 1817, but also met with little success.

=== Later years ===
In 1820, as the postwar economic stabnation began to ease, Friedrich Raßmann accepted a permanent position as Censor at the Münster lending library, a position which eased the financial pressures under which he was living and which he retained till he died. From 1823 his health was clearly in decline. He was suffering both from intensified mental instability and from dropsy, of which the underlying cause is hard to determine. He suffered stomach pains: at least one source mentions acute hypochondria ("...Hypochondrie im höchsten Grad"), but references to his shortness of breath and reduced energy levels during the later 1820s would also be consistent with physical deterioration.

In 1825 Friedrich Raßmann converted to Catholicism. A lot of his fellow citizens in Münster were drifting in the same direction at this time, and it would be enlightening to know from Raßmann why he made the switch. His copious correspondence with friends, though conspicuously garrulous on other personal matters, are at best brief and cryptic on respect of this move. In 1830 he almost "worked himself to death" while preoccupied with his characteristically ambitious and lengthy "Pantheon der Tonkünstler...", a biographical lexicon of all the many musical performers and composers in Germany and abroad worthy of inclusion. It appeared in print only after his death, which took place the next year.

== Letters ==
Even by the standards of the age, Friedrich Raßmann both wrote and received a large number of letters. The more noteworthy writers among his correspondents include Count Otto von Loeben, Anton Matthias Sprickmann, Friedrich de la Motte Fouqué and Louise Brachmann.

== Output (selection) ==
=== Literary works ===
- Kalliope. Eine Sammlung lyrischer und epigrammatischer Gedichte, Münster 1806
- Sommerfrüchte, Münster 1811
- Paul Gerhard. Eine dramatische Poesie, Duisburg und Essen 1812
- Auserlesene poetische Schriften, Heidelberg 1816
- Poetisches Lustwäldchen, Köln 1820
- Poetische Schriften, Leipzig 1821
- Denkmäler deutscher Dichterinnen. In: Friedrich de La Motte-Fouqué (as producer): Frauentaschenbuch für das Jahr 1821. Nürnberg 1821, pp. 244–248.
- Astern, Altenburg 1824

=== History of literature, encyclopaedic and bibliographic works ===
- Münsterländisches Schriftstellerlexikon, 4 vols, Lingen 1814, 1815, 1818 & 1824
  - The fourth supplement appeared only posthumously, in 1833, included in the volume Friedrich Raßmann's Leben und Nachlaß, pp. 107–182.
- Deutscher Dichternekrolog oder gedrängte Übersicht der verstorbenen deutschen Dichter, Romanenschriftsteller, Erzähler und Uebersetzer, nebst genauer Angabe ihrer Schriften, Nordhausen 1818
- Gallerie der jetzt lebenden deutschen Dichter, Romanenschriftsteller, Erzähler, Übersetzer aus neuern Sprachen, Anthologen und Herausgeber belletristischer Schriften, begleitet zum Theil mit hin und wieder ganz neuen, biographischen Notizen, Helmstedt 1818
- Kritisches Gesammtregister oder Nachweisung aller in den deutschen Literatur-Zeitungen und den gelesensten Zeitschriften enthaltenen Rezensionen, mit Andeutung ihres Inhalts, Leipzig 1820
- Pantheon deutscher jetzt noch lebender Dichter und in die Belletristik eingreifender Schriftsteller, Helmstedt 1823
- Literarisches Handwörterbuch der verstorbenen deutschen Dichter und zur schönen Literatur gehörenden Schriftsteller in acht Zeitabschnitten von 1137 bis 1824, Leipzig 1826
- Übersicht der aus der Bibel geschöpften Dichtungen älterer und neuerer deutschen Dichter, mit Einschluß derartiger Übersetzungen. Ein Wegweiser für Literatoren, Freunde der Dichtkunst, Geistliche und Schullehrer, Essen 1829
- Kurzgefasstes Lexikon deutscher pseudonymer Schriftsteller von ältern bis auf die jüngste Zeit aus allen Fächern der Wissenschaften, Leipzig 1830 Digitalisat
- Pantheon der Tonkünstler. Oder Gallerie aller bekannten verstorbenen und lebenden Tonsetzer, Virtuosen, Musiklehrer, musikalischen Schriftsteller des In- und Auslandes. Nebst biographischen Notizen und anderweitigen Andeutungen, Quedlinburg & Leipzig 1831

=== Anthologies ===
- Mimigardia. Poetisches Taschenbuch, 3 Jahresbände: Münster 1810, 1811 und 1812
- Triolette der Deutschen, Duisburg und Essen 1815
- Abenderheiterungen, Quedlinburg 1815
- Sonette der Deutschen, 3 Bände, Braunschweig 1817
- Blumenlese südlicher Spiele im Garten deutscher Poesie, Berlin 1817
- Neue Sammlung triolettischer Spiele, Leipzig 1817
- Auswahl neuerer Balladen und Romanzen, Helmstedt 1818
- Heroiden der Deutschen, Nordhausen 1819
- Neuer Kranz deutscher Sonette, Nürnberg 1820
- Deutsche Anthologie oder Blumenlese aus den Classikern der Deutschen, 16 Bände, Zwickau 1821–1824
- Rheinisch-westphälischer Musenalmanach, 3 Jahresbände: Hamm 1821 und 1822, Köln 1823
- Hesperische Nachklänge in deutschen Weisen. Eine neue Sammlung deutscher Glossen, Villancico's, Cancionen, Sestinen, Canzonen, Balladen, Madrigalen, Minneliedern etc., Köln 1824
- Frühlingsgaben. Erzählungen von Elise Freifrau von Hohenhausen, Max von Schenkendorf, Eduard Messow, Freiherrn von Münchhausen, Ernst Wahlert, Julie Freifrau von Bechtolsheim, Alexis dem Wanderer u.a.m., Quedlinburg und Leipzig 1824
- Fastnachtsbüchlein für Jung und Alt, Hamm 1826
