= Paulus Modestus Schücking =

German lawyer, councillor, philosopher and writer

Paulus Modestus Schücking (Paul Nicolaus Bernhard Joseph Schücking, genannt Modestus; 16 June 1787, Münster – 16 June 1867, Bremen) was a German lawyer, councillor, philosopher and writer. He was also the husband of Katharina Sibylla Schücking and the father of Levin Schücking.

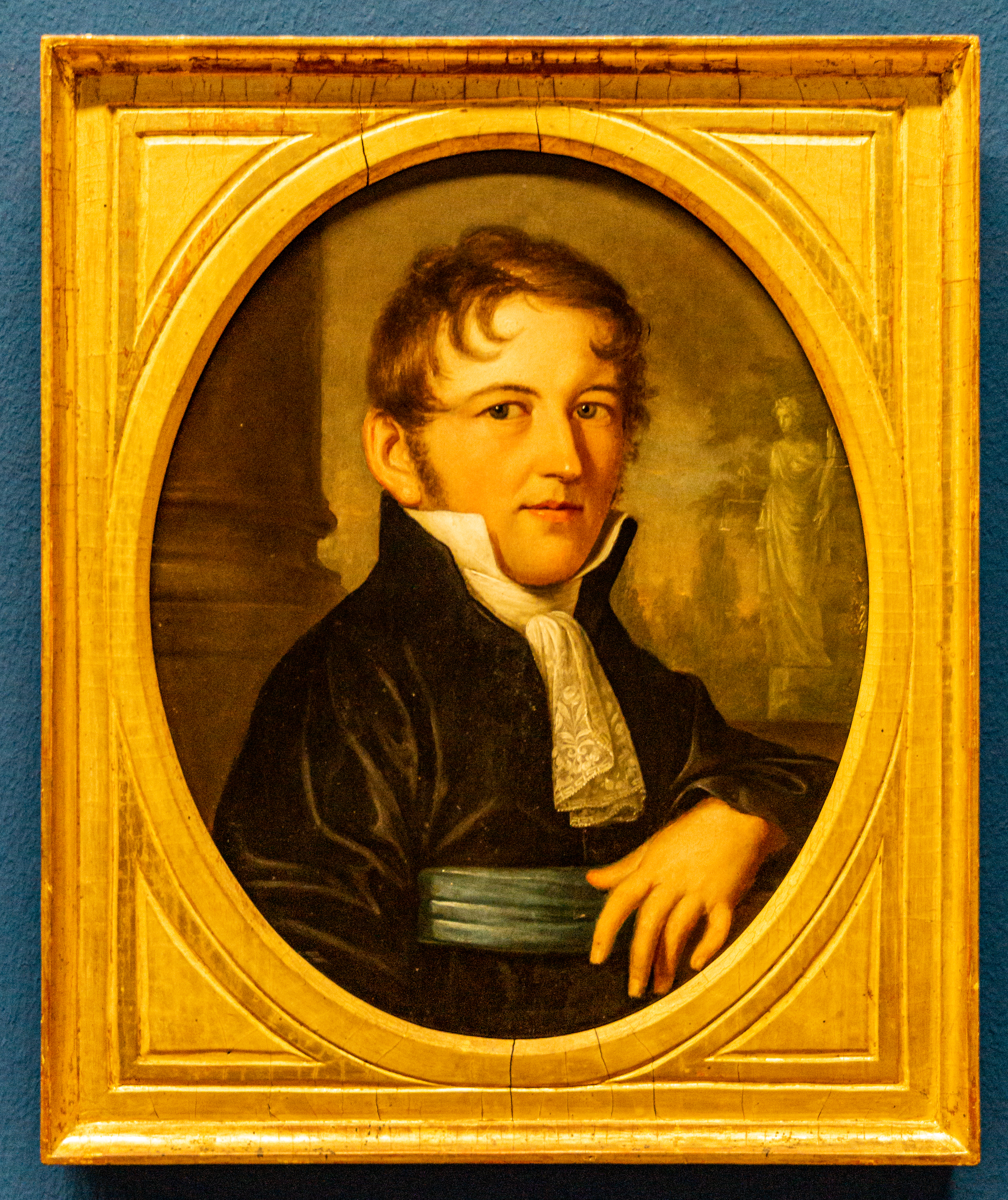
Paulus Modestus Schücking, was a German lawyer.
