= Levin Schücking =

German novelist (1814–1883)

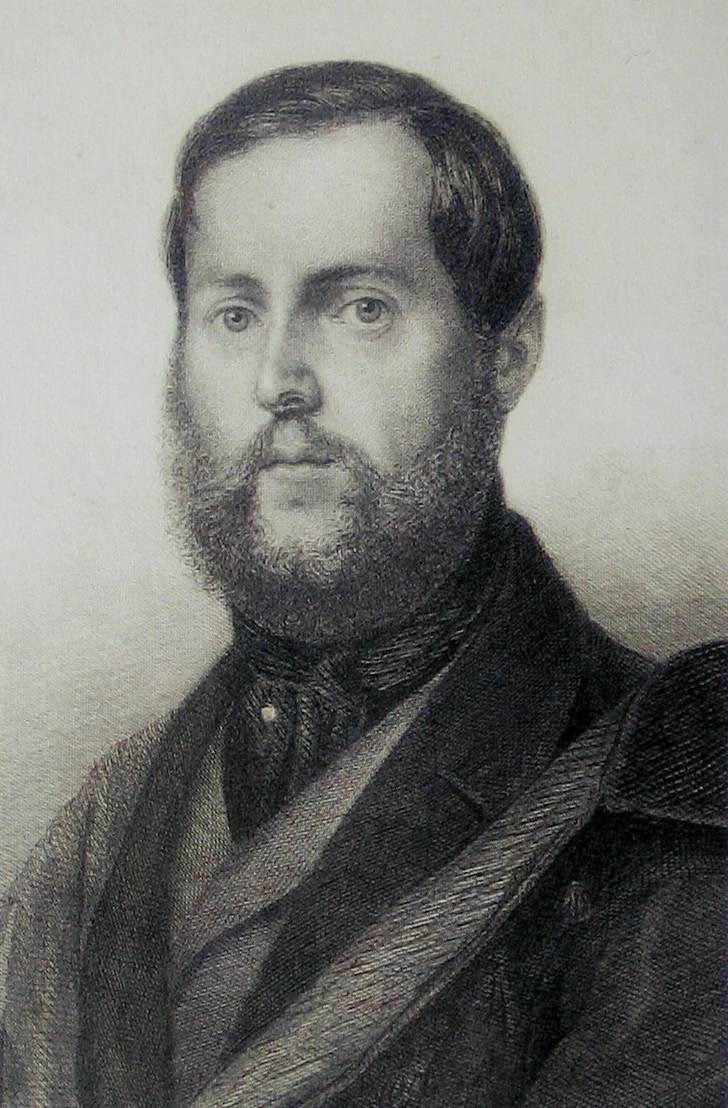
Levin Schücking, 1848

Levin Schücking (full name: Christoph Bernhard Levin Matthias Schücking; September 6, 1814, in Sögel – August 31, 1883, in Pyrmont) was a German novelist. He was born near Meppen, Kingdom of Prussia, and died in Bad Pyrmont, German Empire. He was the uncle of Levin Ludwig Schücking.

== Biography ==
Born into the Westphalian nobility on the estate of Clemenswerth, near Meppen, his mother, Sibilla Katharina née Busch (1791–1831) was a poet who occasionally published, while his father was Paulus Modestus Schücking. Levin's mother became friend of the poet Annette von Droste-Hülshoff, who wrote her son a letter of introduction when he was leaving home for the gymnasium in Münster. Shortly after he left home, his mother died, and Baroness von Droste-Hülshoff did her best to fill this void in his life.

After studying law at the Ludwig-Maximilians-Universität München, Heidelberg University, and the University of Göttingen, Schücking wished to enter the government judicial service, but, confronted by serious difficulties, abandoned the legal career, and settling at Münster in 1837, devoted himself to literary work. In 1841, he removed to Schloss Meersburg on the Lake of Constance.

In 1843, Schücking married Baroness Luise von Gall. Up to this time, Droste-Hülshoff had been a major inspiration in his life, but she and his wife did not get along. Droste-Hülshoff felt he neglected her and that his head was too turned by the revolutionary "Young Germany". And then Schücking published a novel on the Westphalian nobility, which did not depict them favorably, and Droste-Hülshoff's friends, sometimes rightly, sometimes wrongly, traced many of the depictions back to Droste-Hülshoff. This annoyance led to her avoiding Schücking for the rest of her life.

Also in 1843, he joined the editorial staff of the Allgemeine Zeitung in Augsburg, and in 1845, he joined that of the Kölnische Zeitung in Cologne as a literary editor and occasional foreign correspondent. In 1852, he left his career in journalism for his estate in Sassenberg near Münster to have more time for writing. He died at Pyrmont on 31 August 1883.

== Works ==
His first efforts were descriptive:

- Das Malerische und romantische Westfalen (1842)
- Der Dom zu Köln und seine Vollendung (1842)

Among his numerous romances, which are distinguished by good taste and patriotic feeling, largely reflecting the sound, sturdy character of the Westphalians, the most noteworthy include:

- Ein Schloss am Meer (1843)
- Ein Sohn des Vosges (1849)
- Ein Staatsgeheimnis (1854)
- Verschlungene Wege (1867)
- Die Herberge der Gerechtigkeit (1879)

Schucking wrote a number of short stories:

- Aus den Tagen der grossen Kaiserin (1858)
- Neue Novellen (1877)

In Annette von Droste-Hülshoff (1862) he gives a sketch of this poet and acknowledges his indebtedness to her beneficial influence upon his mind. There appeared posthumously, Lebenserinnerungen (1886) and Briefe von Annette von Droste-Hülshoff und Levin Schücking (1893).

His wife, Luise (1815–1855), daughter of the General Freiherr von Gall, in the Hessian service, published some novels and romances of considerable merit. Among the latter may be mentioned Gegen den Strom (1851) and Der neue Kreuzritter (1853). She also wrote a successful comedy, Ein schlechtes Gewissen (1842).

Schücking's Gesammelte Erzählungen und Novellen appeared in 6 vols (1859–1866); Ausgewählte Romane (12 vols, 1864; 2nd series, also 12 vols, 1874–1876).

Several of Schücking's works appeared in the popular German weekly Die Gartenlaube (such as "Pulver und Gold" in January 1871).

== Sources ==
- Hermann Hüffer (1891). "Schücking, Christoph Bernhard Levin" . Allgemeine Deutsche Biographie (in German). Vol. 32. Leipzig: Duncker & Humblot. pp. 643–647.
- Carl Schurz, Reminiscences (3 vols.), New York: McClure Publ. Co., 1907, Vol. 1, Ch. 3, p. 65. Schurz recalls how, as an aspiring writer attending a gymnasium in Cologne, he sent a manuscript to Schücking requesting an appointment to get his opinion on the work. Schücking granted the appointment, but told the disappointed boy he should regard the work as a "study." Schurz later appreciated the wisdom of this advice.
