= Levin Ludwig Schücking =

19th/20th-century German anglicist

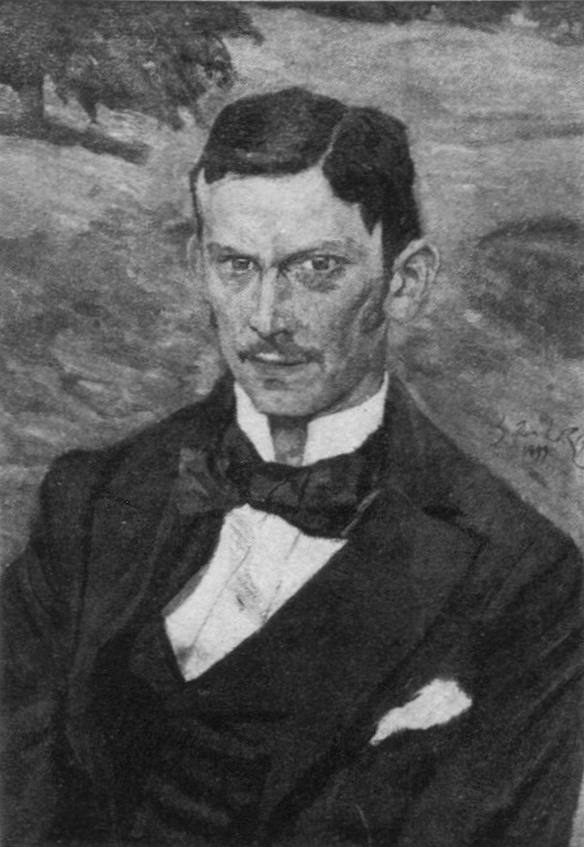
Levin Ludwig Schücking

Levin Ludwig Schücking (29 May 1878, Steinfurt, Westphalia – 12 October 1964, Farchant) was a German scholar of the English language and English literature.

== Life ==
He was the major figure of his time in Germany in English studies, as professor at Leipzig University (he was the director of its English Department from 1925 to 1944). His book Die Soziologie der Literarischen Geschmacksbildung (München: Rösl & Cie.,1923) won international recognition (English translation: The Sociology of Literary Taste London: Kegan Paul, Trench, Trubner & Co. Ltd., 1945).

He was known also for his studies of Old English literature, and Shakespeare.

In 1933, Schücking signed the "Vow of allegiance of the Professors of the German Universities and High-Schools to Adolf Hitler and the National Socialistic State" (Bekenntnis der Professoren an den deutschen Universitäten und Hochschulen zu Adolf Hitler und dem nationalsozialistischen Staat), but later he was an opponent.

He was the oldest son of Paulus and Catharina Schücking, which made him the nephew of writer Levin Schücking.

== Works translated ==
- The Sociology of Literary Taste London: Kegan Paul, Trench, Trubner & Co. Ltd., 1945.
- The meaning of Hamlet (Barnes & Noble 1966)
- The Puritan family: A social study from the literary sources (Schocken Books 1970)
- The Baroque Character Of The Elizabethan Tragic Hero (Kessinger Publishing, LLC, 2007)
- Character Problems in Shakespeare's Plays: A Guide to the Better Understanding of the Dramatist (University of Michigan Library 2009).
