= Anton Matthias Sprickmann =

German writer and lawyer

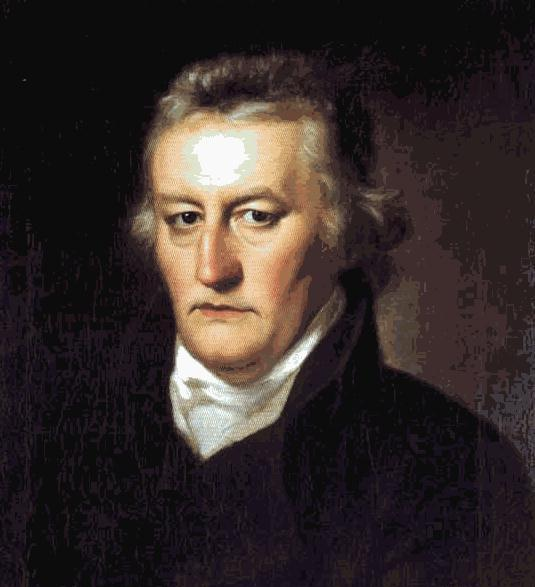
Anton Matthias Sprickmann

Anton Matthias Sprickmann (7 September 1749 – 22 November 1833) was a German writer and lawyer. He was born and died in Münster.
