= Historikerstreit =

German debate on Nazi motives and uniqueness, and guilt of post-Nazi Germany

The Historikerstreit (German: [hɪsˈtoːʁɪkɐˌʃtʁaɪt], 'historians' dispute') (Note: The German word Streit translates variously as 'quarrel', 'dispute', or 'conflict'. The most common translation of Historikerstreit in English-language academic discourse is 'historians' dispute', although the German term is often used.) was a dispute in the late 1980s in West Germany between academics and other intellectuals about how to incorporate Nazi Germany and the Holocaust into German historiography, and more generally into the German people's view of themselves. The dispute was initiated with the Bitburg controversy, which related to a commemorative service at a German military cemetery where members of the Waffen-SS were buried. The service was attended by President of the United States Ronald Reagan, who had been invited by the West German Chancellor Helmut Kohl. The Bitburg ceremony was widely interpreted in Germany as the beginning of the "normalization" of the nation's Nazi past, and inspired a slew of criticisms and defenses that made up the initiating arguments of the Historikerstreit. The dispute quickly outgrew the initial context of the Bitburg controversy, however, and became a series of broader historiographic, political, and critical debates about how the episode of the Holocaust should be understood in Germany's history and identity.

The position taken by one faction of intellectuals, most prominently Ernst Nolte, was that the Holocaust was not unique and therefore Germans should not bear any special burden of guilt for the "Final Solution to the Jewish Question". Nolte argued that there was no moral difference between the crimes of the Soviet Union and those of Nazi Germany, and that the Nazis acted as they did out of fear of what the Soviet Union might do to Germany. Others argued that the memory of the Nazi era could not be "normalized" and be a source of national pride, and that it echoed Nazi propaganda. Other central questions and topics debated within the dispute included the singularity of the Holocaust, the functionalist and intentionalist models of the Holocaust, methodological approaches to historiography, the political utility of history, the question of whether the Holocaust ought to be studied comparatively, and ethics of public commemorations of history.

The debate attracted much media attention in West Germany, with its participants frequently giving television interviews and writing op-ed pieces in newspapers. It flared up again briefly in 2000 when Nolte, one of its leading figures, was awarded the Konrad Adenauer Prize for science.

== Background ==
Immediately after World War II, intense debates arose in intellectual circles about how to interpret Nazi Germany, a contested discussion that continues today. Two of the more hotly debated questions were whether Nazism was in some way part of the "German national character" and how much responsibility, if any, the German people bore for the crimes of Nazism. Various non-German historians in the immediate post-war era, such as A. J. P. Taylor and Lewis Namier, argued that Nazism was the culmination of German history and that the vast majority of Germans were responsible for Nazi crimes. Different assessments of Nazism were common among Marxists, who insisted on the economic aspects of Nazism and conceived of it as the culmination of a capitalist crisis, and liberals, who emphasized Hitler's personal role and responsibility and bypassed the larger problem of the relation of ordinary German people to the regime. Within West Germany, then, most historians were strongly defensive. In the assessment of Gerhard Ritter and others, Nazism was a totalitarian movement that represented only the work of a small criminal clique; Germans were victims of Nazism, and the Nazi era represented a total break in German history.

Starting in the 1960s, that assessment was challenged by younger German historians. Fritz Fischer argued in favor of a Sonderweg conception of German history that saw Nazism as the result of the way German society had developed. In the late 1960s and early 1970s, the functionalist school of historiography emerged; its proponents argued that medium- and lower-ranking German officials were not just obeying orders and policies but actively engaged in the making of the policies that led to the Holocaust. The functionalists thereby cast blame for the Holocaust across a wider circle. Many right-wing German historians disliked the implications of the Sonderweg conception and the functionalist school; they were generally identified with the left and structuralism and were seen by the right-wingers as being derogatory toward Germany.

By the mid-1980s, right-wing German historians began to think that enough time had passed since 1945 and thus it was time for the German nation to start celebrating much of its history again. A sign of the changed mood was the ceremony at Bitburg in May 1985, where US President Ronald Reagan and West German Chancellor Helmut Kohl honored the German war dead buried at Bitburg, including the SS men buried there, which was widely seen as a sign that the memory of the Nazi past had been "normalized" (i.e., that the Nazi period was "normal" and therefore Germans should not feel guilty).> President Reagan justified laying a wreath to honor all the Germans buried at Bitburg who died fighting for Hitler, including the SS men, and his initial refusal to visit the Bergen-Belsen concentration camp under the grounds that the SS men buried at Bitburg were just as much victims of Hitler as the Jews murdered by the SS and that "They [the Germans] just have a guilt feeling that's been imposed on them and I just think it's unnecessary". The ceremony at Bitburg and Reagan's remarks about the need to do away with a German "guilt feeling" about the Nazi past were widely interpreted by German conservatives as the beginning of the "normalization" of the memory of Nazi Germany. Michael Stürmer's 1986 article "Land without History" questioned Germany's lack of positive history in which to take pride. Stürmer's position as Chancellor Kohl's advisor and speechwriter heightened the controversy. At the same time, many left-wing German historians disliked what they saw as the nationalistic tone of the Kohl government.

A project that raised the ire of many on the left, and which became a central issue of the Historikerstreit, consisted of two proposed museums celebrating modern German history, to be built in West Berlin and Bonn. Many of the left-wing participants in the Historikerstreit claimed that the museum was meant to "exonerate" the German past and asserted that there was a connection between the proposed museum, the government, and the views of such historians as Michael Stürmer, Ernst Nolte, and Andreas Hillgruber. In October 1986, Hans Mommsen wrote that Stürmer's assertion that he who controls the past also controls the future, his work as a co-editor of the Frankfurter Allgemeine Zeitung newspaper—which had been publishing articles by Ernst Nolte and Joachim Fest denying the "singularity" of the Holocaust—and his work as an advisor to Chancellor Kohl should cause "concern" among historians.

== Overview ==
=== Participants ===
On one side were the philosopher and historian Ernst Nolte, the journalist Joachim Fest, and the historians Andreas Hillgruber, Klaus Hildebrand, Rainer Zitelmann, Hagen Schulze, and Michael Stürmer. Opposing them were the philosopher Jürgen Habermas and the historians Hans-Ulrich Wehler, Jürgen Kocka, Hans Mommsen, Martin Broszat, Heinrich August Winkler, Eberhard Jäckel, and Wolfgang Mommsen. Karl Dietrich Bracher and Richard Löwenthal argued for some compromise; they said that comparing different totalitarian systems was a valid intellectual exercise, but they insisted that the Holocaust should not be compared to other genocides.

=== Issues ===
The views of Ernst Nolte and Jürgen Habermas were at the center of the debate, conducted almost exclusively through articles and letters to the editor in the newspapers Die Zeit and the Frankfurter Allgemeine Zeitung. People in West Germany followed the debate with interest. The debate was noted for its vitriolic and aggressive tone, with the participants often engaging in ad hominem attacks. In Hillgruber's 1986 book, Zweierlei Untergang ("Two Kinds of Downfall: The Smashing of the German Reich and the End of European Jewry"), he lamented the mass expulsions of ethnic Germans from Czechoslovakia and Poland at the end of World War II and compared the suffering of the Heimatvertriebene ("those expelled from their native land") to that of victims of the Holocaust. Hillgruber had not supported Nolte, but the controversy over Zweierlei Untergang became linked with Nolte's views when Habermas and Wehler characterized both men as conservatives trying to minimize Nazi crimes.

The debate centered on four questions:

- Were the crimes of Nazi Germany uniquely evil or were other crimes, such as those of Joseph Stalin in the Soviet Union, comparably so? Were other genocides comparable to the Holocaust? Many scholars believed that such comparisons trivialized the Holocaust. Others maintained that the Holocaust could best be understood in the context of other crimes.
- Did German history follow a "special path" (Sonderweg) leading inevitably to Nazism?
- Were the crimes of the Nazis a reaction to Soviet crimes under Stalin?
- Should the German people bear a special burden of guilt for Nazi crimes, or can new generations of Germans find sources of pride in their history?

== Immediate background ==
=== "Between Myth and Revisionism" ===
In 1980, the Frankfurter Allgemeine Zeitung newspaper published a feuilleton "Between Myth and Revisionism: The Third Reich In the Perspective of the 1980s", where Nolte sketched out many of the same ideas that later appeared in his 1986 essay "The Past That Will Not Go Away". The essay "Between Myth and Revisionism" was also published in English in the 1985 book Aspects of the Third Reich by the Anglo-German historian H. W. Koch, where it was billed incorrectly as an essay written for Aspects of the Third Reich. It was the 1985 version of "Between Myth and Revisionism" that Habermas noticed and referred to in his essay "On Damage Control".

According to Nolte in "Between Myth and Revisionism", during the Industrial Revolution in Britain, the shock of the replacement of the old craft economy by an industrialized, mechanized economy led to various radicals starting to advocate what Nolte calls "annihilation therapy" as the solution to social problems. In Nolte's views, the roots of communism can be traced back to 18th and 19th century radicals like Thomas Spence, John Gray, William Benbow, Bronterre O'Brian, and François-Noël Babeuf. Nolte has argued that the French Revolution began the practice of "group annihilation" as state policy, but not until the Russian Revolution did the theory of "annihilation therapy" reach its logical conclusion and culmination. He asserts that much of the European Left saw social problems as being caused by "diseased" social groups, and sought "annihilation therapy" as the solution, thus leading naturally to the Red Terror and the Yezhovshchina in the Soviet Union. Nolte suggests that the Right mirrored the Left, with "annihilation therapy" advocated by such figures as John Robison, Augustin Barruel, and Joseph de Maistre; Malthusianism and the Prussian strategy of utter destruction of one's enemies during the Napoleonic Wars also suggest sources and influences for National Socialism. Ultimately, in Nolte's view, the Holocaust was just a "copy" of Communist "annihilation therapy", albeit one that was more terrible and sickening than the "original".

=== Bitburg controversy ===
In 1984, the West German Chancellor Helmut Kohl invited the U.S. President Ronald Reagan to mark the 40th anniversary of the end of World War II in Europe by attending a memorial service at a military cemetery in Bitburg. Reagan accepted the offer, unaware that members of the Waffen-SS were buried in the Bitburg cemetery, and when this was reported in early 1985, many Americans urged Reagan to cancel the planned visit to Bitburg under the grounds it was offensive for president of the United States to lay a memorial wreath honoring those SS men who died fighting for Hitler.

Kohl insisted that if Reagan snubbed the Bitburg ceremony that it would be the end of his chancellorship, saying the majority of Germans would find it offensive. Reagan, arguing that placing a memorial wreath at Bitburg was no different from doing so at Auschwitz, stated that Waffen-SS men who died fighting for Hitler were just as much victims of Hitler as the Jews exterminated in the death camps. This clumsy attempt at public relations damage control only increased the controversy, with both veterans' groups and Jewish groups in the United States being adamantly opposed to Reagan attending the Bitburg ceremony.

Reagan also refused to visit a concentration camp to balance out the visit to the Bitburg cemetery by saying the Germans "have a guilt feeling that's been imposed on them, and I just think it's unnecessary". The Franco-Romanian Holocaust survivor and writer Elie Wiesel issued a public letter to Reagan saying: "That place, Mr. President, is not your place. Your place is with the victims of the SS". After Wiesel's letter, which helped to crystallize opposition in the United States to the Bitburg service, Reagan and Kohl very reluctantly agreed to visit the Bergen-Belsen concentration camp to honor the memory of who died there, though both Reagan and Kohl went out their way to insist the visit to Bergen-Belsen should not be the cause for Germans to have any "guilt feelings" about the Nazi past.

The Bitburg ceremony was widely interpreted in Germany as the beginning of the "normalization" of the Nazi past, namely the viewpoint that the Germans had a "normal" history that would not cause shame or guilt, and instead inspire pride in being German. The Christian Democratic politician and Second World War veteran Alfred Dregger, in a public letter published on 20 April 1985 and written to a group of 53 U.S. senators opposed to the Bitburg service, stated for Reagan to not attend the Bitburg service would be an insult both to himself and to his brother who had been killed fighting the Red Army in 1945. Dregger stated that he was proud to have served in the Wehrmacht and to have fought the Red Army in Silesia in 1945, insisting he and his brother had fought in World War II in an effort to save Europe from Communism. Finally, Dregger linked Nazi Germany's war against the Soviet Union to the Cold War, arguing that all of the men buried in Bitburg, whatever they were in the Wehrmacht or the Waffen-SS, had died fighting nobly and honorably against the Soviet Union, which was just as much the enemy in 1985 as it had been in 1945. Bringing up a point later made by Andreas Hillgruber, Dregger emphasized Red Army atrocities against German civilians in 1945, insisting he and everybody else served on the German side in the Eastern Front had waged an "honorable" fight to protect German civilians from the Red Army. Dregger called Hitler and his regime a small criminal clique that had nothing to do with the honorable and noble war waged by the Wehrmacht to "defend" Germany from the Red Army, arguing that the battles and campaigns to protect German civilians from the Red Army was an episode in Germany worthy of the utmost admiration, and should be honored with Reagan attending the Bitburg memorial service.

Amid much controversy, on 8 May 1985, Kohl and Reagan visited the Bitburg cemetery and placed memorial wreaths to honor all of the Wehrmacht and Waffen-SS men buried there. The American historian Fritz Stern wrote that Kohl and Reagan were engaging in "symbolic politics" with the Bitburg ceremony, to suggest the memory of the Nazi past should to a certain extent be exorcised with the idea to honor those who died fighting in the Waffen-SS as victims of Hitler, but instead the immense controversy caused by the Bitburg ceremony caused shown that the Nazi past could not be "normalized" as they had wished.

On the same day as the Bitburg ceremony, the West German president Richard von Weizsäcker delivered a speech in Bonn which was an "implicit rebuke" to the Bitburg ceremony where he stated the Jews exterminated in the Holocaust were much more victims of Hitler than those Germans who died fighting for Hitler. In the same speech, Weizsäcker also stated the memory of the Nazi past could not be "normalized" and the memory of the Nazi era would always be a source of shame for Germans. The contrasting reactions to the Bitburg controversy and to Weizsäcker's speech brought to the fore the question of whether Germans should still feel shame at the Nazi past forty years later or not. On one side, there were those who insist that West Germany was a "normal" country that should have a "normal" history that would inspire national pride in being German, and on the other there were those who insisted the memory of the Nazi era could not be "normalized" and be a source of national pride. The debate was not entirely along left-right lines as Weizsäcker was a Second World War veteran and a conservative.

The intense controversy caused by the Bitburg memorial service with its suggestion that the Nazi era was a "normal" period led those who were in favor of "normalization" to redouble their efforts. The Frankfurter Allgemeine Zeitung newspaper published an opinion piece in early 1986 saying that the Jews needed to be "tactful" in dealing with Germans and should not be bringing up the Holocaust as that would insult German sensitivities. The minister-president of Bavaria, Franz Josef Strauss, complained that the Germans had spent too long "on their knees" and needed to learn how to "walk tall again", arguing that 40 years of guilt had been quite enough. As part of his "walk tall" speech, Strauss argued that West Germany needed to "become a normal nation again", saying "German history cannot be presented as an endless chain of mistakes and crimes", and that Germans should be proud to be German. Strauss's reference to the Germans "kneeling" in his "walk tall" speech was to the Kniefall von Warschau when in 1970 the West German chancellor Willy Brandt had knelt before a memorial to the Warsaw Ghetto, saying as a German he felt ashamed of what had happened. Strauss's "walk tall" speech, with its implicit criticism of Brandt kneeling in guilt before the site of the Warsaw Ghetto, was very polarizing.

=== "History In A Land Without History" ===
In a feuilleton published in the Frankfurter Allgemeine Zeitung on 25 April 1986, the German historian Michael Stürmer complained that most Germans lacked pride in their history, which he felt threatened the future. Stürmer wrote "...that in a land without history, the future is controlled by those who determine the content of memory, who coin concepts and interpret the past". Stürmer warned that with most Germans lacking pride in their history that this a destabilizing factor that nobody could predict where it would end.

Stürmer felt that the left had too much power in regards to the memory of the past, complaining that the Social Democrats were still concerned 40 years after 1945 with "battling the social foundations of fascism in the Federal Republic". Stürmer wanted for historians to find the "lost history" that would inspire national pride in being German. Stürmer wrote that Germany's allies were becoming concerned with the German lack of pride in their history, stating:

"the Federal Republic has political and economic responsibility in the world. It is the centerpiece of European defense within the Atlantic system...It is also becoming evident that the technocratic underestimation of history by the political Right and the progressive strangulation of history by the Left is seriously damaging the political culture of the country. The search for a lost past is not an abstract striving for culture and education. It is morally legitimate and politically necessary".

=== Zweierlei Untergang ===
In May 1986, a book by Andreas Hillgruber, Zweierlei Untergang: Die Zerschlagung des Deutschen Reiches und das Ende des europäischen Judentums (Two Kinds of Ruin: The Smashing of the German Reich and the End of European Jewry), was published in Berlin. The book consisted of two essays by Hillgruber, in which he argued the end of Germany as a great power in 1945 and the Holocaust were morally equivalent tragedies.

Much of the controversy generated by Zweierlei Untergang was due to the essay Der Zusammenbruch im Osten 1944/45 (The Collapse in the East 1944/45) in which Hillgruber presented an account of the Eastern Front in 1944–45 and mourned the end of "the German east". Hillgruber had been born and grew up in the town of Angerburg (modern Węgorzewo, Poland) in what was then East Prussia and often wrote nostalgically about his lost Heimat. Hillgruber expressed much anger in Zweierlei Untergang about the Oder-Neisse line, the expulsions of the Germans from Eastern Europe and the partitioning of Germany, all of which he used to argue that the policies of the Allies towards the Germans during and after World War II were just as horrific as the Holocaust.

In particular, Hillgruber accused Winston Churchill and the rest of the British government of being obsessed with anti-German and anti-Prussian prejudices going back to at least 1907, and maintained it was always Britain's goal to "smash" the German Reich. Hillgruber accused the British of holding "a negative image of Prussia, exaggerated to the point of becoming a myth", which according to Hillgruber led them to seek the complete dismantlement of the Prussian-German state in World War II and blinded them to the fact that only a strong Central European state led by Prussia could have prevented the "flooding" of Central Europe by the Red Army.

Hillgruber in Der Zusammenbruch im Osten 1944/45 was also concerned with the "justified" last stand of the Wehrmacht on the Eastern Front in 1944–45, giving a lengthy account of Red Army war crimes against German civilians. Hillgruber argued that the Wehrmacht in 1944-1945 was fighting "for a centuries-old area of German settlement, for the home of millions of Germans who lived in a core of the German Reich - namely in eastern Prussia, in the provinces of East Prussia, West Prussia, Silesia, East Brandenburg and Pomerania".

Hillgruber wrote:

"If the historian gazes on the winter catastrophe of 1944–45, only one position is possible...he must identify himself with the concrete fate of the German population in the East and with the desperate and sacrificial exertions of the German Army of the East and the German Baltic navy, which sought to defend the population from the orgy of revenge of the Red Army, the mass rapine, the arbitrary killing, and the compulsory deportations."

Besides for his call for historians to "identify" with the Wehrmacht, Hillgruber condemned the Putsch of 20 July 1944 as irresponsible and wrong and praised those Wehrmacht officers who stayed loyal to Hitler as making the correct moral choice. Hillgruber argued that the need to protect German civilians from the Red Army should have been the overriding concern of all Wehrmacht officers, which required remaining loyal to Hitler.

== Historikerstreit begins, June 1986 ==
=== "The Past That Will Not Pass" ===
Nolte launched the Historikerstreit ("Historians' Dispute") on 6 June 1986 with an article in the Frankfurter Allgemeine Zeitung: Vergangenheit, die nicht vergehen will: Eine Rede, die geschrieben, aber nicht mehr gehalten werden konnte ("The Past That Will Not Pass: A Speech That Could Be Written but Not Delivered"). His feuilleton was a distillation of ideas he had first introduced in lectures delivered in 1976 and in 1980. Earlier in 1986, Nolte had planned to deliver a speech before the Frankfurt Römerberg Conversations (an annual gathering of intellectuals), but he had claimed that the organizers of the event withdrew their invitation. In response, an editor and co-publisher of the Frankfurter Allgemeine Zeitung, Joachim Fest, allowed Nolte to have his speech printed as a feuilleton in his newspaper. One of Nolte's leading critics, British historian Richard J. Evans, claims that the organizers of the Römerberg Conversations had not withdrawn their invitation, and that Nolte had just refused to attend.

Nolte began his feuilleton by remarking that it was necessary in his opinion to draw a "line under the German past". Nolte argued that the memory of the Nazi era was "a bugaboo, as a past that in the process of establishing itself in the present or that is suspended above the present like an executioner's sword". Nolte used as an example of the problem of the "Past That Will Not Go Away" that in Nazi Germany, the "mania of masculinity" was "full of provocative self-confidence", but now German men were afraid to be manly because German feminists had made National Socialism the "present enemy". In the same way, Nolte charged that Germans were being forced to live under the fear of being labelled anti-semitic; Nolte wrote based on his viewing of the film Shoah it was clear that the SS guards of the death camps were "victims of a sort and that among the Polish victims of National Socialism there was virulent anti-Semitism".

Nolte complained that excessive present-day interest in the Nazi period had the effect of drawing "attention away from the pressing questions of the present-for example, the question of "unborn life" or the presence of genocide yesterday in Vietnam and today in Afghanistan". Nolte argued that the furor in 1985 over the visit of the American president Ronald Reagan to the Bitburg cemetery reflected in his view the unhealthy effects of an obsession with the memory of the Nazi era. Nolte suggested that, during West German Chancellor Konrad Adenauer's visit to the United States in 1953, if he had failed to visit Arlington National Cemetery a storm of controversy would have ensued. Nolte argued that since some of the men buried at Arlington had in his view "participated in terror attacks on the German civilian population", there was no moral difference between Reagan visiting the Bitburg cemetery, with its graves of Waffen SS dead, and Adenauer visiting Arlington with its graves of American airmen. Nolte complained that because of the "past that would not pass", it was controversial for Reagan to visit Bitburg, but it was not controversial for Adenauer to visit Arlington. Nolte cited the Bitburg controversy as an example of the power exerted by historical memory of the Nazi past. Nolte concluded that there was excessive contemporary interest in the Holocaust because it served the concerns of those descended from the victims of Nazism, and placed them in a "permanent status of privilege". Nolte argued that Germans had an unhealthy obsession with guilt for Nazi crimes, and called for an end to this "obsession". Nolte's opinion was that there was no moral difference between German self-guilt over the Holocaust, and Nazi claims of Jewish collective guilt for all the world's problems. He called for an end to the maintaining of the memory of the Nazi past as fresh and current, and suggested a new way of viewing the Nazi past that would allow Germans to be free of the "past that will not pass".

In his feuilleton, Nolte offered a new way of understanding German history which sought to break free of the "past that will not pass", by contending that Nazi crimes were only the consequence of a defensive reaction against Soviet crimes. In Nolte's view, National Socialism had only arisen in response to the "class genocide" and "Asiatic barbarism" of the Bolsheviks. Nolte cited as example the early Nazi Max Erwin von Scheubner-Richter, who during World War I had been the German consul in Erzerum, Turkey, where he was appalled by the genocide of the Armenians. In Nolte's view, the fact that Scheubner-Richter later became a Nazi shows that something must have changed his values, and in Nolte's opinion it was the Russian Revolution and such alleged Bolshevik practices as the "rat cage" torture (said by Russian émigré authors to be a favorite torture by Chinese serving in the Cheka during the Russian Civil War) that led to the change. (Note: Evans disputes Nolte's evidence for the "rat cage" torture being a common Bolshevik practice.) Nolte used the example of the "rat cage" torture in George Orwell's 1948 novel 1984 to argue that the knowledge of the "rat cage" torture was widespread throughout the world. Nolte wrote about the horrors perpetuated by the "Chinese Cheka" as showing the "Asiatic" nature of the Bolsheviks. Furthermore, Nolte argues that the "rat cage" torture was an ancient torture long practiced in China, which in his opinion further establishes the "Asiatic barbarism" of the Bolsheviks. Nolte cited a statement by Hitler after the Battle of Stalingrad that Field Marshal Friedrich Paulus would be soon sent to the "rat cage" in the Lubyanka as proof that Hitler had an especially vivid fear of the "rat cage" torture.

Along the same lines, Nolte argued that the Holocaust, or "racial genocide" as Nolte prefers to call it, was an understandable if excessive response on the part of Adolf Hitler to the Soviet threat and the "class genocide" with which the German middle class was said to be threatened. In Nolte's view, Soviet mass murders were Vorbild (the terrifying example that inspired the Nazis) and Schreckbild (the terrible model for the horrors perpetrated by the Nazis). Nolte labeled the Holocaust an "überschießende Reaktion" (overshooting reaction) to Bolshevik crimes, and to alleged Jewish actions in support of Germany's enemies. In Nolte's opinion, the essence of National Socialism was anti-Communism, and anti-Semitism was only a subordinate element to anti-Bolshevism in Nazi ideology. Nolte argued that because "the mighty shadow of events in Russia fell most powerfully" on Germany, that the most extreme reaction to the Russian Revolution took place there, thus establishing the "causal nexus" between Communism and fascism. Nolte asserted that the core of National Socialism was

"neither in criminal tendencies nor in anti-Semitic obsessions as such. The essence of National Socialism [was to be found] in its relation to Marxism and especially to Communism in the form which this had taken on through the Bolshevik victory in the Russian Revolution".

In Nolte's view, Nazi anti-communism was "understandable and up to a certain point, justified". For Nolte, the "racial genocide" as he calls the Holocaust was a "punishment and preventive measure" on the part of the Germans for the "class genocide" of the Bolsheviks. American historian Peter Baldwin noted parallels between Nolte's views and those of American Marxist historian Arno J. Mayer:. Both Nolte and Mayer perceive the interwar period as one of intense ideological conflict between the forces of the Right and Left, positing World War II as the culmination of this conflict, with the Holocaust a byproduct of the German-Soviet war. Baldwin distinguished Nolte from Mayer in that Nolte considered the Soviets aggressors who essentially got what they deserved in the form of Operation Barbarossa, whereas Mayer considered the Soviets to be victims of German aggression. Operation Barbarossa, in Nolte's thinking, was a "preventive war" forced on Hitler by an alleged impending Soviet attack. Nolte wrote that Hitler's view of the Russian people as barbarians was an "exaggeration of an insight which was basically right in its essence" and that Hitler "understood the invasion of the Soviet Union as a preventive war" as the Soviet desire to bring Communism to the entire world "must be seen as mental acts of war, and one may even ask whether a completely isolated and heavily armed country did not constitute a dangerous threat to its neighbors on these grounds alone".

The crux of Nolte's thesis was presented when he wrote:

"It is a notable shortcoming of the literature about National Socialism that it does not know or does not want to admit to what degree all the deeds—with the sole exception of the technical process of gassing—that the National Socialists later committed had already been described in a voluminous literature of the early 1920s: mass deportations and shootings, torture, death camps, extermination of entire groups using strictly objective selection criteria, and public demands for the annihilation of millions of guiltless people who were thought to be "enemies".

It is probable that many of these reports were exaggerated. It is certain that the "White Terror" also committed terrible deeds, even though its program contained no analogy to the "extermination of the bourgeoisie". Nonetheless, the following question must seem permissible, even unavoidable: Did the National Socialists or Hitler perhaps commit an "Asiatic" deed merely because they and their ilk considered themselves to be the potential victims of an "Asiatic" deed? Wasn't the 'Gulag Archipelago' more original than Auschwitz? Was the Bolshevik murder of an entire class not the logical and factual prius of the "racial murder" of National Socialism? Cannot Hitler's most secret deeds be explained by the fact that he had not forgotten the rat cage? Did Auschwitz in its root causes not originate in a past that would not pass?"

Nolte wrote the principal problem "for the coming generations...must be liberation from collectivist thinking", which Nolte claimed dominated scholarship on Nazi Germany. Nolte ended his essay with calling for a "more comprehensive debate" about the memory of Nazi Germany that would allow for "the past that will not go away" to finally go away "as is suitable for every past".

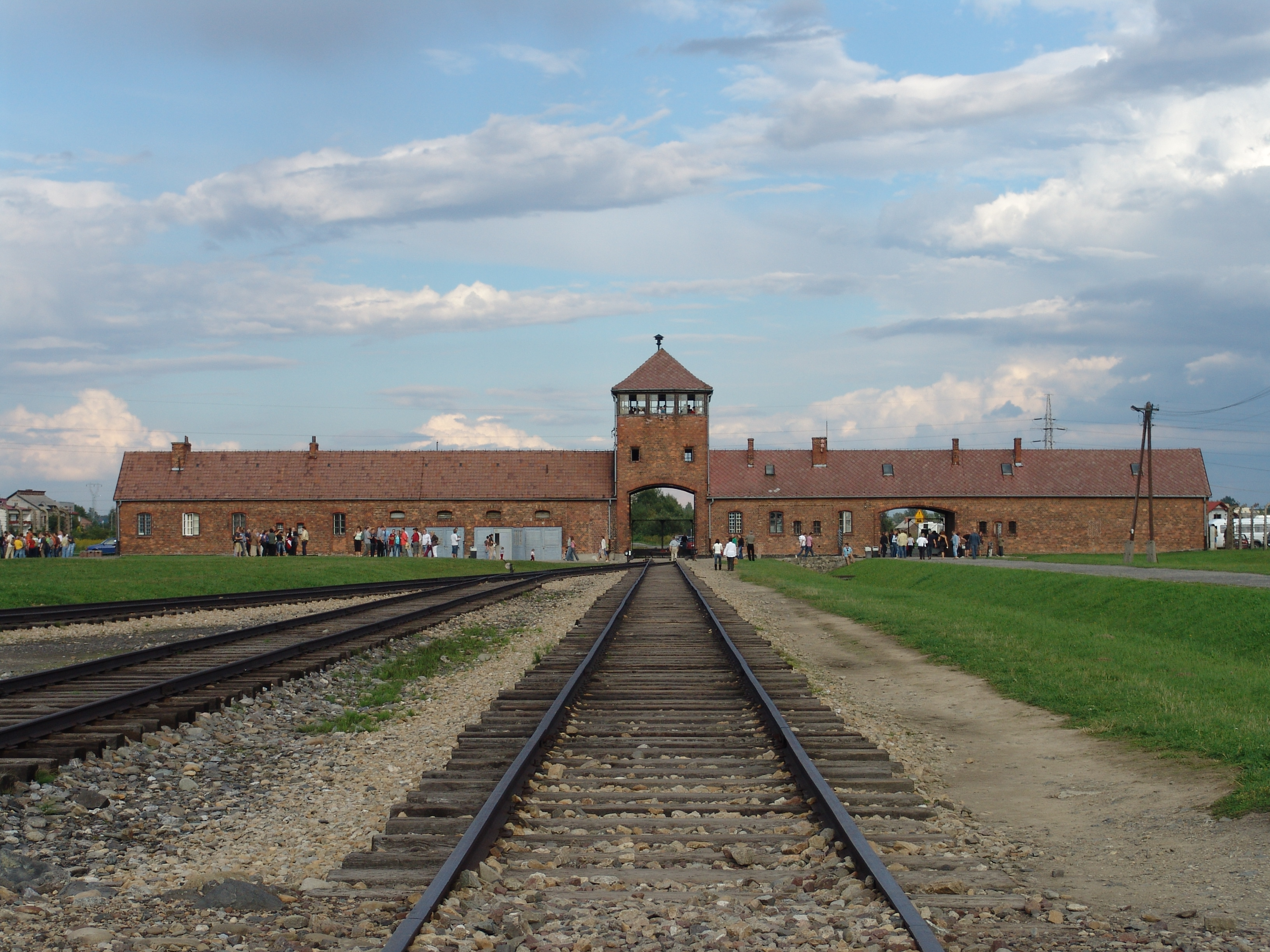
Nolte called the Auschwitz death camp and the other German death camps of World War II a "copy" of the Soviet Gulag camps.

Nolte subsequently presented a 1940 book by American author Theodore N. Kaufman entitled Germany Must Perish!. The text contends that all German men should be sterilized, evidencing, according to Nolte, the alleged "Jewish" desire to "annihilate" Germans prior to the Holocaust. An August 1941 appeal to the world by a group of Soviet Jews seeking support against Germany was also cited by Nolte as evidence of Jewish determination to thwart the Reich. Nolte argued that the Nazis felt forced to undertake the Holocaust by Hitler's conclusion that the entire Jewish population of the world had declared war on Germany. From Nolte's point of view, the Holocaust was an act of "Asiatic barbarism" forced on the Germans by the fear of what Joseph Stalin, whom Nolte believed to have significant Jewish support, might do to them. Nolte contends that the U.S. internment of Japanese Americans in the wake of the Pearl Harbor attack provides a parallel to the German "internment" of the Jewish population of Europe in concentration camps, in light of what Nolte alleges was the "Jewish" declaration of war on Germany in 1939 which Weizmann's letter allegedly constitutes.

Subsequently, Nolte expanded upon these views in his 1987 book Der europäische Bürgerkrieg 1917–1945 (The European Civil War 1917–1945) in which he claimed that the entire 20th century was an age of genocide, totalitarianism, and tyranny, and that the Holocaust had been merely one chapter in the age of violence, terror and population displacement. Nolte claimed that this age had started with the genocide of the Armenians during World War I, and also included the Stalinist terror in the Soviet Union, the expulsion of ethnic Germans from Eastern Europe, Maoist terror in China as manifested in such events as the Great Leap Forward and the Cultural Revolution, compulsory population exchanges between Greece and Turkey from 1922 to 1923, American war crimes in the Vietnam War, the Khmer Rouge genocide in Cambodia, and the Soviet invasion of Afghanistan. In particular, Nolte argued that the expulsion of ethnic Germans from Eastern Europe in 1945–46 was "to be categorized...under the concept of genocide". As part of this argument, Nolte cited the 1979 book of the American historian Alfred-Maurice de Zayas, [[The Wehrmacht War Crimes Bureau, 1939-1945|Die Wehrmacht Untersuchungsstelle]], which argues that the Allies were just as guilty of war crimes as the Germans as the "happy evidence of the will to objectivity on the part of a foreigner" In Nolte's opinion, Hitler was a "European citizen" who fought in defence of the values of the West against "Asiatic" Bolshevism, but due to his "total egocentrism" waged this struggle with unnecessary violence and brutality. Since in Nolte's view, the Shoah was not a unique crime, there is no reason to single out Germans for special criticism for the Holocaust.

In addition, Nolte sees his work as the beginning of a much-needed revisionist treatment to end the "negative myth" of Nazi Germany that dominates contemporary perceptions. Nolte took the view that the principal problem of German history was this "negative myth" of Nazi Germany, which cast the Nazi era as the ne plus ultra of evil. Nolte wrote that after the American Civil War, the defeated South was cast as the symbol of total evil by the victorious North, but later "revisionism" became the dominant historical interpretation against the "negative myth" of the South, which led to a more balanced history of the Civil War with a greater understanding of the "motives and way of life of the defeated Southern states", and led to the leaders of the Confederacy becoming great American heroes. Nolte urged that a similar "revisionism" destroy the "negative myth" of Nazi Germany. Nolte argued that the Vietnam War, the Khmer Rouge genocide, the expulsion of "boat people" from Vietnam, the Islamic revolution in Iran, and the Soviet invasion of Afghanistan meant the traditional picture of Nazi Germany as the ultimate in evil was no longer tenable, and proved the need for "revisionism" to put an end to the "negative myth" of Nazi Germany. In Nolte's view, the first efforts at revisionism of the Nazi period failed because A. J. P. Taylor's 1961 book The Origins of the Second World War was only a part of the "anti-German literature of indictment" while David Hoggan in Der erzwungene Krieg, by only seeking to examine why World War II broke out in 1939, "cut himself off from the really decisive questions". Then the next revisionist efforts Nolte cites were the Italian historian Domenico Settembrini's favorable treatment of Fascism for saving Italy from Communism, and the British historian Timothy Mason's studies in working class German history. The best of the revisionists according to Nolte is David Irving, with whom Nolte finds some fault, although "not all of Irving's theses and points can be dismissed with such ease". Nolte praises Irving as the first to understand that Weizmann's letter to Chamberlain was a "Jewish declaration of war" on Germany that justified the "interning" of the Jews of Europe. Nolte went on to praise Irving for putting the Holocaust "in a more comprehensive perspective" by comparing it to the Allied bombing of Hamburg in 1943, which Nolte views as just much of an act of genocide as the "Final Solution". The sort of revisionism needed to end the "negative myth" of Nazi Germany is, in Nolte's opinion, an examination of the impact of the Russian Revolution on Germany.

Nolte contends that the great decisive event of the 20th century was the Russian Revolution of 1917, which plunged all of Europe into a long-simmering civil war that lasted until 1945. To Nolte, fascism, Communism's twin, arose as a desperate response by the threatened middle classes of Europe to what Nolte has often called the "Bolshevik peril". He suggests that if one wishes to understand the Holocaust, one should begin with the industrial revolution in Britain, and then understand the rule of the Khmer Rouge in Cambodia. Nolte then proceeds to argue that one should consider what happened in the Soviet Union in the interwar period by reading the work of Aleksandr Solzhenitsyn. In a marked change from the views expressed in The Three Faces of Fascism, in which Communism was a stream of "transcendence", Nolte now classified communism together with fascism as both rival streams of the "resistance to transcendence". The "metapolitical phenomenon" of Communism in a Hegelian dialectic led to the "metapolitical phenomenon" of fascism, which was both a copy of and the most ardent opponent of Marxism. As an example of his thesis, Nolte cited an article written in 1927 by Kurt Tucholsky calling for middle-class Germans to be gassed, which he argued was much more deplorable than the celebratory comments made by some right-wing newspapers about the assassination of the German Foreign Minister Walther Rathenau in 1922. Richard J. Evans, Ian Kershaw and Otto Dov Kulka all claimed that Nolte took Tucholsky's sardonic remark about chemical warfare out of context. Kershaw further protested the implication of moral equivalence between a remark by Tucholsky and the actual gassing of Jews by Nazis, which Kershaw suggests is an idea which originates in neo-Nazi pamphleteering.

In his 1987 book Der europäische Bürgerkrieg, 1917–1945, Nolte argued in the interwar period, Germany was Europe's best hope for progress. Nolte wrote that "if Europe was to succeed in establishing itself as a world power on an equal footing [with the United States and the Soviet Union], then Germany had to be the core of the new 'United States'". Nolte claimed if Germany had to continue to abide by Part V of the Treaty of Versailles, which had disarmed Germany, then Germany would have been destroyed by aggression from her neighbors sometime later in the 1930s, and with Germany's destruction, there would have been no hope for a "United States of Europe". The British historian Richard J. Evans accused Nolte of engaging in a geopolitical fantasy.

=== "A Kind of Damage Control" ===
The philosopher Jürgen Habermas in an article entitled "A Kind of Damage Control: On Apologetic Tendencies In German History Writing" in the Die Zeit of 11 July 1986 strongly criticized Nolte, along with Andreas Hillgruber and Michael Stürmer, for engaging in what Habermas called "apologetic" history writing in regards to the Nazi era, and for seeking to "close Germany's opening to the West" that in Habermas's view has existed since 1945. Habermas criticized Stürmer for his essay "History in a land without history" as engaging in "damage control" with German history and wrote that Hillgruber and Nolte were putting his theories into practice.

Habermas criticized Hillgruber for demanding historians "identify" with the Wehrmacht's last stand on the Eastern Front as being purely "selective". Habermas charged that as long as the Wehrmacht held out, the Holocaust continued, but that Hillgruber's approach which emphasized the war on the Eastern Front from the viewpoint of the ordinary German soldier and the "desperate civilian population" serves to sever the "Final Solution of the Jewish Question" from history. Habermas charged that Hillgruber had much sympathy with the German soldiers who found a "picture of horror of raped and murdered women and children" at Nemmersdorf, but his way of "identifying" with the Wehrmacht meant the Holocaust went unmentioned. Habermas wrote in the second part of his essay, Hillgruber who previously insisted on a "bird's eye" view of the Eastern Front from the viewpoint of the ordinary German soldier now used the perspective of a historian to argue the Allies were always planning on destroying Germany and it was wrong for the Allies to impose the Oder-Neisse line as the new eastern frontier of Germany, which Habermas felt to be a double standard. Habermas wrote Hillgruber had failed as a historian, stating: "Hillgruber is most deeply appalled by the high proportion of university-trained men who participated [in the Holocaust]-as if there were not a completely plausible explanation for that. In short, the phenomenon that a civilized populace let these horrible things happen is one that Hillguber removes from the technical competence of the overburdened historian and blithely pushes off into the dimension of the generally human".

Habermas called Nolte the "officious-conservative narrator" who presented a version of history in which the "annihilation of the Jews appears as a regrettable, but perfectly understandable result". Habermas criticized Nolte for claiming that Chaim Weizmann declared war on Germany in 1939 which "was supposed to justify Hitler in treating German Jews as prisoners of war-and then in deporting them". Habermas wrote:

"The culture section of Frankfurter Allgemeine Zeitung, June 6, 1986 included a militant article by Ernst Nolte. It was published, by the way, under a hypocritical pretext with the heading "the talk that could not be delivered". (I say this with knowledge of the exchange of letters between the presumably disinvited Nolte and the organizers of the conference). When the Nolte article was published Stürmer also expressed solidarity. In it Nolte reduces the singularity of the annihilation of the Jews to "the technical process of gassing". He supports his thesis about the Gulag Archipelago is "primary" to Auschwitz with the rather abstruse example of the Russian Civil War. The author gets little more from the film Shoah by Lanzmann than the idea that "the SS troops in the concentration camps might themselves have been victims of a sort and that among the Polish victims of National Socialism there was virulent anti-Semitism". These unsavoury samples show that Nolte puts someone like Fassbinder in the shade by a wide margin. If the Frankfurter Allgemeine Zeitung was justifiably drawn to oppose the planned performance of Fassbinder's play, then why did it choose to publish Nolte's letter [A reference to the play The Garbage, the City, and Death by Rainer Werner Fassbinder about an unscrupulous Jewish businessman who exploits German guilt over the Holocaust that many see as anti-Semitic]...The Nazi crimes lose their singularity in that they are at least made comprehensible as an answer to the (still extant) Bolshevist threats of annihilation. The magnitude of Auschwitz shrinks to the format of technical innovation and is explained on the basis of the "Asiatic" threat from an enemy that still stands at our door".

In particular, Habermas took Nolte to task for suggesting a moral equivalence between the Holocaust and the Khmer Rouge genocide. In Habermas's opinion, since Cambodia was a backward, Third World agrarian state and Germany a modern, First World industrial state, there was no comparison between the two genocides.

Habermas then linked what he called the revisionism of Nolte, Hillgruber and Stürmer with the planned German Historical Museum in Berlin and the House of History in Bonn, which he criticized for a nationalistic view of German history. Habermas accused Stürmer of subordinating history to politics and of attempting to strangle the emergence of individualistic society with his demand for "historical consciousness as vicarious religion". Habermas wrote: "The unconditional opening of the Federal Republic to the political culture of the West is the greatest intellectual achievement of our postwar period; my generation should be especially proud of this. This event cannot and should not be stabilized by a kind of NATO philosophy colored with German nationalism. The opening of the Federal Republic has been achieved precisely by overcoming the ideology of Central Europe that our revisionists are trying to warm up for us with their geopolitical drumbeat about `"the old geographically central position of the Germans in Europe" (Stürmer) and "the reconstruction of the destroyed European Center" (Hillgruber). The only patriotism that will not estrange us from the West is a constitutional patriotism."

=== "The New Myth of State" ===
The sub-title of Hillgruber's book drew controversy with the Swiss historian Micha Brumlik in an essay entitled "New Myth of State" first published in Die Tagezeitung newspaper on 12 July 1986, commenting that the use of the word Zerschlagung (destruction) for the Germans indicated that an act of extreme violence was committed against the Germans while the Jews were assigned only the neutral term Ende (end) to describe the Holocaust. Brumlik argued that in his view, Hillgruber by his use of the word "End" to label the Holocaust implied that the Shoah was just something terrible that happened to the Jews of Europe, but it was not anybody's fault. Brumlik accused Hillgruber of reducing German history down to the level of Landserheft (a type of comics in Germany glorifying war). Brumlik argued that Hillgruber's thesis about the Holocaust as one of many genocides, instead of a unique event, was a form of "psychological repression" to avoid dealing with guilt over the Holocaust. Brumlik wrote: "Even if we do not look into Stalinist totalitarianism and its murderous work camps, the expansionism of the Soviet Union since 1945, the irresponsible foreign policy adventures of the Soviet Union and its thoroughly repressive regime, it now is becoming clear what role anticommunism played and plays in the political culture of psychological repression...Only if this equation is made; only if is further insinuated that the Soviet Union wanted to exterminate the Germans; other than does it seem legitimate that the nation conducting the war protected the annihilation camps". Brumlik wrote that Hillgruber was clearly trying to suggest that the Soviet Union was waging genocide against the Germans, which made the war effort of Nazi Germany in the East to be as Hillgruber would have it a "justified" defense of German civilians even as at the same time the defensive efforts of the Wehrmacht allowed the Holocaust to continue. Brumlik wrote though Zweierlei Untergang only covered the period from June 1944 to May 1945, it did serve to implicitly to turn what was a war of conquest on the part of Germany into a defensive struggle to protect Germans while pushing the Jews being exterminated by the Reich into the background. Brumlik wrote that Hillgruber in Zweierlei Untergang had played up the role of Germans as victims in World War II at the expense of Germans as perpetrators. The American historian Gordon A. Craig expressed the view that Hillgruber's choice of the word Ende for the Holocaust suggested that the Holocaust was "something that just sort of happened".

=== "The Age of Tyrants" ===
In response to Habermas's essay, Klaus Hildebrand came to the defence of Nolte. Hildebrand in an essay entitled "The Age of Tyrants" first published in the Frankfurter Allgemeine Zeitung on July 31, 1986, went on to praise Nolte for daring to open up new questions for research. Hildebrand wrote that Habermas had done a "bad service to politics and denies scholarship outright". Hildebrand accused Habermas of fabricating the sentence in which Hillgruber had praised the "tried and true higher-ups of the NSDAP", noting that Hillgruber wrote a long sentence in which Habermas had selectively quoted from without ellipsis. Hildebrand wrote that Hillgruber had understood history as a tragedy and "... this fact escaped Habermas, perhaps due to a lack of expertise, perhaps also due to an unfamiliarity with historical research". Hildebrand wrote that Hillgruber was not trying to glorify the Wehrmacht as Habermas was charging; instead maintaining Hillgruber approach in writing history from the viewpoint of the average German soldier on the Eastern Front in 1944–45 was "legitimate and necessary". Hildebrand praised Hillgruber for his new approach to the Eastern Front and accused Habermas of having a "simplistic image of history... without regard to new sources, new realizations, and new questions". Hildebrand ended his essay with the remarking that Habermas should have just remained silent as he nothing intelligent to say as he was suffering from a "loss of reality and Manichaenism".

=== Nolte's letter to Die Zeit, 1 August 1986 ===
Nolte for his part, started to write a series of letters to various newspapers such as Die Zeit and Frankfurter Allgemeine Zeitung attacking his critics; for an example, in a letter to Die Zeit on 1 August 1986, Nolte complained that his critic Jürgen Habermas was attempting to censor him for expressing his views, and accused Habermas of being the one responsible for blocking him from attending the Römerberg Conversations. In the same letter, Nolte described himself as the unnamed historian whose views on the reasons for the Holocaust had at dinner party in May 1986 in Bonn had caused Saul Friedländer to walk out in disgust that Habermas had alluded to an earlier letter

=== Habermas's letter to the FAZ, 11 August 1986 ===
Responding to the essay "The Age of Tyrants: History and Politics" by Klaus Hildebrand defending Nolte and Hillgruber, Habermas wrote that Hillgruber's approach "perhaps would be a legitimate point of view for the memoirs of a veteran-but not for a historian writing from the distance of four decades". Habermas wrote:

"In his essay Ernst Nolte treats the 'so-called' annihilation of the Jews (in H.W. Koch, ed. Aspects of the Third Reich, London, 1985). Chaim Weizmann's declaration in the beginning of September 1939 that the Jews of the world would fight on the side of England, 'justified' – so opinioned Nolte – Hitler to treat the Jews as prisoners of war and to intern them. Other objections aside, I cannot distinguish between the insinuation that world Jewry is a subject of international law and the usual anti-Semitic projections. And if it had at least stopped with deportation. All this does not stop Klaus Hildebrand in the Historische Zeitschrift from commending Nolte's 'pathfinding essay', because it 'attempts to project exactly the seeming unique aspects of the history of the Third Reich onto the backdrop of the European and global development'. Hildebrand is pleased that Nolte denies the singularity of the Nazi atrocities."

=== Stürmer's letter to the FAZ, 16 August 1986 ===
Stürmer in a letter to the editor of Frankfurter Allgemeine Zeitung published on 16 August 1986 accused Habermas of "sloppy research with patched-together quotes in an attempt to place historians on his blacklist". Stürmer wrote that was attempting to answer the "German question" by working for the "affirmation and development of the Atlantic and European ties of our country" and denied seeking to "endow history with a higher meaning". Stürmer ended his letter with the remark: "What should one think of an indictment that even fabricates its own sources?... It's a shame about this man [Habermas] who once had something to say".

=== "Encumbered Remembrance" ===
Fest in an essay entitled "Encumbered Remembrance" first published in the Frankfurter Allgemeine Zeitung on August 29, 1986, claimed that Nolte's argument that Nazi crimes were not singular was correct. Fest accused Habermas of "academic dyslexia" and "character assassination" in his attacks against Nolte. In response to Habermas's claim that the Holocaust was not comparable to the Khmer Rouge genocide because Germany was a First World nation and Cambodia a Third World nation, Fest, who was one of Nolte's leading defenders, called Habermas a racist for suggesting that it was natural for Cambodians to engage in genocide while unnatural for Germans. Fest argued against the "singularity" of the Holocaust under the grounds that:

"The gas chambers with which the executors of the annihilation of the Jews went to work without a doubt signal a particularly repulsive form of mass murder, and they have justifiably become a symbol for the technicized barbarism of the Hitler regime. But can it really be said that the mass liquidations by a bullet to the back of the neck, as was common practice during the years of the Red Terror, are qualitatively different? Isn't, despite all the differences, the comparable element stronger?... The thesis of the singularity of Nazi crimes is finally also placed in question by the consideration that Hitler himself frequently referred to the practices of his revolutionary opponents of the Left as lessons and models. But he did more than just copy them. Determined to be more radical than his most bitter enemy, he also outdid them"

Moreover, Fest argued in his defence of Nolte that in the overheated atmosphere in Munich following the overthrow of the Bavarian Soviet Republic in 1919 "... gave Hitler's extermination complexes a real background", writing that Nolte was indeed correct that reports of Bolshevik atrocities in the Russian Civil War together with a number of Jews serving in the Bavarian Soviet Republic inspired Hitler to exterminate the Jews. Fest defended Nolte's point about Poles being "virulently anti-semitic" by mentioning the Kielce pogrom of July 1946 as proving that the Polish people were indeed murderously anti-semitic, writing that historians should take account of this. Finally, Fest wrote as part of his attack on the "singularity" of the Holocaust that:

"There are questions upon questions, but no answer can be offered here. Rather, it is a matter of rousing doubt in the monumental simplicity and one-sidedness of the prevailing ideas about the particularity of the Nazi crimes that supposedly had no model and followed no example. All in all, this thesis stands on weak ground. And it is less surprising that, as Habermas incorrectly suggests in reference to Nolte, it is being questioned. It is far more astonishing that this has not seriously taken place until now. For that also means that the countless other victims, in particular, but not exclusively those of Communism, are no longer part of our memory. Arno Borst once declared in a different context that no group in today's society has been ruthlessly oppressed as the dead. That is especially true for the millions of dead of this century, from the Armenians all the way to the victims of the Gulag Archipelago or the Cambodians who were and still being murdered before all of our eyes-but who have still been dropped from the world's memory"

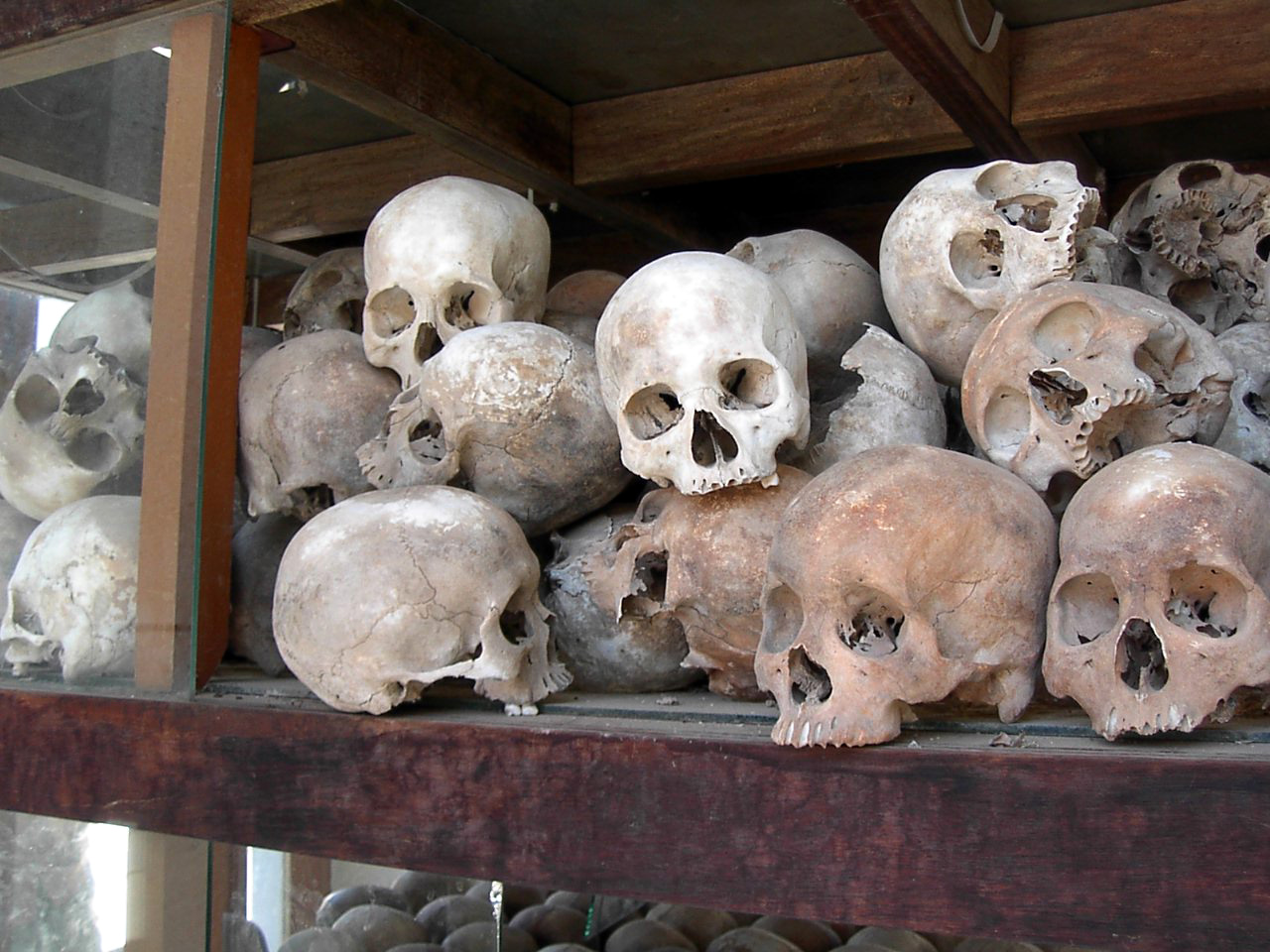
Skulls of Khmer Rouge victims. Nolte's admirer Joachim Fest was to defend Nolte by arguing that Habermas was a racist for arguing that it was natural for Cambodians to practice genocide and unnatural for Germans.

=== Bracher's letter to the FAZ, 6 September 1986 ===
In a letter to the editor of Frankfurter Allgemeine Zeitung published on September 6, 1986, Karl Dietrich Bracher that nothing new was being presented by either side. Bracher wrote that he approved of Joachim Fest's essay "Encumbered Remembrance" about the moral equivalence of Nazi and Communist crimes, though he remained pointedly silent about Fest's support for the theory of Ernst Nolte of a "causal nexus" with German National Socialism as an extreme, but understandable response to Soviet Communism. Bracher argued that "...the "totalitarian" force of these two ideologies [Communism and National Socialism] seized the whole human and seduced and enslaved him". Bracher accused both Jürgen Habermas and Ernst Nolte of both "...tabooing the concept of totalitarianism and inflating the formula of fascism". Bracher complained about the "politically polarized" dispute that was blinding historians to the "comparability" of Communism and National Socialism Bracher ended his letter by writing that neither National Socialism nor Communism lost none of "...their respective "singular" inhumanity by comparisons. Neither a national nor a socialist apologetic can be supported on that basis".

=== "The Impoverished Practice of Insinuation" ===
The historian Eberhard Jäckel in an essay first published in the Die Zeit newspaper on September 12, 1986, argued that Nolte's theory was ahistorical on the grounds that Hitler held the Soviet Union in contempt, and could not have felt threatened as Nolte claimed. Jäckel wrote, in an essay entitled "The Impoverished Practice of Insinuation: The Singular Aspect of National-Socialist Crimes Cannot Be Denied",

"Hitler often said why he wished to remove and kill the Jews. His explanation is a complicated and structurally logical construct that can be reproduced in great detail. A rat cage, the murders committed by the Bolsheviks, or a special fear of these are not mentioned. On the contrary, Hitler was always convinced that Soviet Russia, precisely because it was ruled by Jews, was a defenseless colossus standing on clay feet. Aryans had no fear of Slavic or Jewish subhumans. The Jew, Hitler wrote in 1926 in Mein Kampf, "is not an element of an organization, but a ferment of decomposition. The gigantic empire in the East is ripe for collapse". Hitler still believed this in 1941 when he had his soldiers invade Russia without winter equipment."

Jäckel attacked Nolte's statement that Hitler had an especially intense fear of the Soviet "rat cage" torture by arguing that Hitler's statement of February 1, 1943 to his generals about captured German officers going off to the "rat cage" clearly meant the Lubyanka prison, and this is not as Nolte was arguing to be interpreted literally. Jäckel went on to argue that Nolte had done nothing to establish what the remarks about the "rat cage" had to do with the Holocaust. Jäckel accused Nolte of engaging in a Post hoc ergo propter hoc argument to establish the "causal nexus" between Hitler's supposed fear of the "rat cage" torture, and the Holocaust. Against Nolte's claim that the Holocaust was not unique but rather one among many genocides, Jäckel rejected the assertion of Nolte and his supporters, such as Joachim Fest:

"I, however claim (and not for the first time) that the National Socialist murder of the Jews was unique because never before had a nation with the authority of its leader decided and announced that it would kill off as completely as possible a particular group of humans, including old people, women, children and infants, and actually put this decision into practice, using all the means of governmental power at its disposal. This idea is so apparent and so well known that is quite astonishing that it could have escaped Fest's attention (the massacres of the Armenians in the Ottoman Empire during the First World War were, according to all we know, more like murderous deportations than planned genocide)".

Jäckel later described Nolte's methods as a "game of confusion", comprising dressing hypotheses up as questions, and then attacking critics who demanded evidence for his assertions as seeking to block one from asking questions.

=== "The Morality of History" ===
The philosopher Helmut Fleischer in an essay first published in the Nürnberger Zeitung newspaper on September 20, 1986, defended Nolte against Habermas under the grounds that Nolte was only seeking to place the Holocaust into a wider political context of the times. Fleischer wrote the dispute was really "about the moral judgement of the Nazi past". Flesicher wrote in defense of Hillgruber that he had the moral case for justifying the Wehrmacht's last stand on the Eastern Front as necessary to protect German civilians from the Red Army. Fleischer accused Habermas of seeking to impose a left-wing moral understanding on the Nazi period on Germans and of creating a "moral" Sondergericht (Special Court). Fleischer argued that Nolte was only seeking the "historicization" of National Socialism that Martin Broszat had called for in a 1985 essay by trying to understand what caused National Socialism, with a special focus on the fear of Communism.

== Historikerstreit, autumn 1986 ==
=== "Hitler Should Not Be Repressed By Stalin and Pol Pot" ===
The German historian Jürgen Kocka in an essay first published in Die Zeit on September 26, 1986, contended against Nolte that the Holocaust was indeed a "singular" event because it had been committed by an advanced Western nation, and argued that Nolte's comparisons of the Holocaust with similar mass killings in Pol Pot's Cambodia, Joseph Stalin's Soviet Union, and Idi Amin's Uganda were invalid because of the backward nature of those societies. Kocka dismissed Fest's claims that Habermas was a racist for rejecting comparisons with Cambodia, writing "it has to do with historical knowledge about the connection between economic development and the possibilities of sociopolitical organization, and also with taking seriously the European tradition, in consideration of which the Enlightenment, human rights and the constitutional state cannot be simply ignored". Kocka went to criticize Nolte's view of the Holocaust as "a not altogether incomprehensible reaction to the prior threat of annihilation, as whose potential or real victims Hitler and the National Socialists allegedly were justified in seeing themselves". Kocka wrote that:

"The real causes of anti-Semitism in Germany are to be found neither in Russia nor the World Jewish Congress. And how can one, in light of the facts, interpret the National Socialist annihilation of the Jews as a somewhat logical, if premature, means of defense against the threats of annihilation coming from the Soviet Union, with which Germany had made a pact in 1939, and which it then subsequently attacked? Here the sober historical inquiry into real historical connections, into causes, and consequences, and about real motives and their conditions would suffice to protect the writer and the reader from abstruse speculative interpretations. Nolte fails to ask such questions. If a past "that is capable of being agreed on" can be gained by intellectual gymnastics of this sort, then we should renounce it."

Kocka argued against Stürmer that "Geography is not destiny". Kocka argued there other countries in "the middle" like Poland, Switzerland and Germany itself prior to 1871 did not evolve in the same way that Germany did after 1871, stating that Stürmer's argument that Bismark needed to impose an authoritarian government because of geography was simply wrong.

=== "Questions We Have To Face" ===
Hagen Schulze in an essay first published in Die Zeit on September 26, 1986, defended Nolte, together with Andreas Hillgruber, and argued Habermas was acting from "incorrect presuppositions" in attacking Nolte and Hillgruber for denying the "singularity" of the Holocaust. Schulze argued that Habermas's attack on Nolte was flawed because he never provided any proof that the Holocaust was unique, and argued there were many "aspects" of the Holocaust that were "common" with other historical occurrences. In Schulze's opinion:

"For the discipline of history, singularity and comparability of historical events are thus not mutually exclusive alternatives. They are complementary concepts. A claim that historians such as Ernst Nolte or Andreas Hillgruber deny the uniqueness of Auschwitz because they are looking for comparisons stems from incorrect presuppositions. Of course, Nolte and Hillgruber can be refuted if their comparisons rest on empirically or logically false assumptions. But Habermas never provided such proof."

Schulze defended Stürmer's call for the historians to explore the "German question", writing that it was "important" for historians to "make the national identity of the Germans an object of their research". Schulze dismissed Habermas's call for "constitutional patriotism" under the grounds a form of national identity grounded in loyalty to the Basic Law of 1949 was too dry to work, and the German people needed a national identity that was more emotional to work.

=== "A Searching Image of the Past" ===
The Swiss journalist Hanno Helbling in an essay first published in the Neu Zuricher Zeitung newspaper on September 26, 1986, accused Nolte and his allies of working to destroy "the 'negative myth' of Nazi Germany, not only by revising our inevitable understanding of this reign of terror, but also by restoring the national past." Nelbling complained: "Revisionists who gloss over the evils of National Socialism and deny its atrocities have raised a ruckus latterly. What they claim is without scholarly substance and cannot influence our understanding of history in the long term". Helbling wrote about Nolte's comment about the problem of a "negative myth of the Third Reich" that Nolte wrote "as if myths were necessary to make our understanding of National Socialism negative... Or can take refuge in countermyths of the negative kind and thus come close to a leveling strategy, just as announcements of horrors from the distant past are not suited to proving that back then, too, murderous deeds were committed. And what about the recent past: "Didn't Stalin..."; in Cambodia, didn't they..." These are sad calcuations [sic?], which in a strange way have propagated themselves into the political view of the present".

=== "The Search for the 'Lost History'?" ===
Hans Mommsen in an essay first published in the September 1986 edition of Merkur accused Nolte of attempting to "relativize" Nazi crimes within the broader framework of the 20th century. Mommsen asserted that by describing Lenin's Red Terror in Russia as an "Asiatic deed" threatening Germany, Nolte was arguing that all actions directed against Communism, no matter how morally repugnant, were justified by necessity. Mommsen wrote that the problem with German conservatives after 1945 was lack of a "reservoir of conservative values to which it could connect without interruption". Mommsen wrote the theory of totalitarianism served Cold War needs so "that could not only decorate itself with the epithet "anti-Fascist" but could also rule out and criminalize leftist efforts" and for the "bracketing out the period of the Third Reich from the continuity of German history". Mommsen argued this "bracketing out" was necessary because of the continuity of the German bureaucracy from the Weimar to Nazi to post-war periods, which required a "psychological repression of the criminal politics of the Third Reich". In this regard, Mommsen wrote: "It is significant that the Weimar Republic was viewed in the years immediately following 1945 as an experiment failed from the onset; not until the success of the chancellor democracy did this image brighten. Then the Weimar experience could be trotted out for the additional legitimization of the Federal Republic and the fundamental superiority the Federal Republic assured". Mommsen wrote that the Bitburg controversy of 1985 had "made surprisingly clear that the burdens of the Second World War now as before possess traumatic meaning. These burdens disturbed the dramaturgy of the Bitburg spectacle, which, under the fiction of final reconciliation among friends, was supposed to replace the idea of a crusade by the Allies against the Hitler dictatorship with the idea of a crusade against Communist world dictatorship".

Mommsen wrote it was a reaction to the Bitburg controversy that led historians like Michael Stürmer to insist that the Germans needed a positive history to end what Stürmer called the "collective obsession with guilt". Mommsen praised what Stümer deplored, writing the "prevailing mistrust in the Federal Republic, independent of every party affiliation of any cult of community, organized by the state, of appeals for national willingness to make sacrifices and of sentiment against national pathos and national emblems has its roots in the political sobering up that arose from the experiences of the Third Reich. Whoever wants to see in this a lack of patriotic sentiment should be clear once and for all that there is no lack of willingness for democratic participation, although this frequently takes place outside of the corrupt apparatus of the large parties... It is therefore absurd to want to rehabilitate older authoritarian attitudes through historical relativizing. It is a mistake to characterize as a wrong path the consequences of action inferred from the flawed developments of the period between the wars". Mommsen accused the Kohl government of seeking to revive German nationalism "via a detour" of "strengthening national consciousness" through the planned German Historical Museum in West Berlin. Mommsen wrote the purposes of the German Historical Museum together with the House of History in Bonn was to "make us forget the Holocaust and Operation Barbarossa under the slogan of "normalizing". This intention has nothing to do with the understanding of history that has grown stepwise in postwar Germany, an understanding that has come about apart from the classical monumental history and frequently independently of the scholarly discipline".

=== "The New Historical Consciousness" ===
In another essay first published in the Blätter für deutsche und internationale Politik magazine in October 1986, Mommsen was to call Nolte's claim of a "causal nexus" between National Socialism and Communism "not simply methodologically untenable, but also absurd in it premises and conclusions". Mommsen wrote in his opinion that Nolte's use of the Nazi era phrase "Asiatic hordes" to describe Red Army soldiers, and his use of the word "Asia" as a byword for all that is horrible and cruel in the world reflected racism. Mommsen wrote:

"In contrast to these irrefutable conditioning factors, Nolte's derivation based on personalities and the history of ideas seems artificial, even for the explanation of Hitler's anti-Semitism...If one emphasizes the indisputably important connection in isolation, one should not then force a connection with Hitler's Weltanschauung, which was in no ways original itself, in order to derive from it the existence of Auschwitz. The battle line between the political right in Germany and the Bolsheviks had achieved its aggressive contour before Stalinism employed methods that led to the death of millions of people. Thoughts about the extermination of the Jews had long been current, and not only for Hitler and his satraps. Many of these found their way to the NSDAP from the Deutschvölkisch Schutz-und Trutzbund [German Racial Union for Protection and Defiance], which itself had been called into life by the Pan-German Union. Hitler's step from verbal anti-Semitism to practical implementation would then have happened without knowledge of and in reaction to the atrocities of the Stalinists. And thus one would have to overturn Nolte's construct, for which he cannot bring biographical evidence to bear. As a Hitler biographer, Fest distanced himself from this kind of one-sidedness by making reference to "the Austrian-German Hitler's earlier fears of and phantasies of being overwhelmed". It is not completely consistent that Fest admits that the reports of the terrorist methods of the Bolsheviks had given Hitler's "extermination complexes" a "real background". Basically, Nolte's proposal in its one-sidedness is not very helpful for explaining or evaluating what happened. The anti-Bolshevism garnished with anti-Semitism had the effect, in particular for the dominant elites, and certainly not just the National Socialists, that Hitler's program of racial annihilation met with no serious resistance. The leadership of the Wehrmacht rather willingly made themselves into accomplices in the policy of extermination. It did this by generating the "criminal orders" and implementing them. By no means did they merely passively support the implementation of their concept, although there was a certain reluctance for reasons of military discipline and a few isolated protests. To construct a "causal nexus" over all this amounts in fact to steering away from the decisive responsibility of the military leadership and the bureaucratic elites."

Mommsen wrote it was no accident that Stürmer sat on the editorial board of the Frankfurter Allgemeine Zeitung, the same newspaper that run the essays by Nolte and Fest denying the "singularity" of the Holocaust given that Stürmer's self-proclaimed mission was to give Germans a history that would inspire national pride. Mommsen wrote: "What is taking place at present is no conspiracy. A better description would be that national sentiments, long dammed up and visible only in marginal literature, are coming together in an unholy alliance and seeking new shores". Mommsen wrote the question of the "singularity" of the Holocaust was legitimate, but the motives of Hildebrand and Stürmer were political rather than scholarly, to end the "German obsession with guilt". Mommsen wrote" "To accept with resignation the acts of screaming injustice and to psychologically repress their social prerequisites by calling attention to similar events elsewhere and putting the blame on the Bolshevist world threat recalls the thought patterns that made it possible to implement genocide". Mommsen that when in the spring of 1943 the graves of the Polish officers massacred by the NKVD were discovered in Katyn Wood, the massacre was given massive publicity in Germany as a symbol of Soviet terror, going on to note those Germans opposed to the Nazi regime continue to view the Nazi regime as something worse despite all the publicity about the Katyn Wood massacre in Germany. Mommsen wrote the present campaign was a form of "psychological repression" intended to end any guilt over the Holocaust.

In another essay entitled "Reappraisal and Repression The Third Reich In West German Historical Consciousness", Mommsen wrote that:

"Nolte's superficial approach which associates things that do not belong together, substitutes analogies for causal arguments, and – thanks to his taste for exaggeration – produces a long outdated interpretation of the Third Reich as the result of a single factor. His claims are regarded in professional circles as a stimulating challenge at best, hardly as a convincing contribution to an understanding of the crisis of twentieth-century capitalist society in Europe. The fact that Nolte has found eloquent supporters both inside and outside the historical profession has little to do with the normal process of research and much to do with the political implications of the relativization of the Holocaust that he has insistently championed for so long... The fundamentally apologetic character of Nolte's argument shines through most clearly when he concedes Hitler's right to deport, through not to exterminate, the Jews in response to the supposed "declaration of war" issued by the World Jewish Congress; or when he claims that the activities of the SS Einsatzgruppen can be justified, at least subjectively, as operations aimed against partisans fighting the German Army."

Mommsen was later in a 1988 book review entitled "Resentment as Social Science" to call Nolte's book, Der Europäische Bürgerkrieg, a "regression back to the brew of racist-nationalistic ideology of the interwar period".

=== "Where the Roads Part" ===
Martin Broszat in an essay first published in Die Zeit on October 3, 1986, labeled Nolte an obnoxious crank and a Nazi apologist who making "offensive" statements about the Holocaust. Regarding Nolte's claim that Weizmann on behalf of world Jewry had declared war on Germany in 1939, Broszat wrote that Weizmann's letter to Chamberlain promising the support of the Jewish Agency in World War II was not a "declaration of war", nor did Weizmann have the legal power to declare war on anyone. Broszat commented, "These facts may be overlooked by a right-wing publicist with a dubious educational background, but not by the university professor Ernst Nolte." Broszat observed that when Hildebrand organized a conference of right-wing German historians under the auspices of the Schleyer Foundation in West Berlin in September 1986, he did not invite Nolte, whom Broszat observed lived in Berlin. Broszat suggested that this was Hildebrand's way of trying to separate himself from Nolte, whose work Hildebrand had praised so strongly in a review the Historische Zeitschrift in April 1986. Broszat wrote that Stürmer was trying to create an "ersatz religion" that was more appropriate for the pre-modern era than 1986, charging that Stürmer seemed torn between his commitment to democracy, NATO and Atlanticism vs. his call for history to serve as a unifying force for society. Broszat wrote that "Here the roads part", and argued that no self-respecting historian could associate himself with the effort to "drive the shame out of the Germans". Broszat ended his essay with the remark that such "perversions" of German history must be resisted in order to ensure the German people a better future.

=== "The New Auschwitz Lie" ===
The journalist Rudolf Augstein, the publisher of the Der Spiegel news journal accused Nolte of creating the "New Auschwitz Lie" in an essay first published in the October 6, 1986 edition of Der Spiegel. Augstein questioned just why Nolte referred to the Holocaust as the "so-called annihilation of the Jews". Augstein agreed with Nolte that the Israelis were "blackmailing" the Germans over the Holocaust, but argued that given the magnitude of the Holocaust, the Germans had nothing to complain about. Augstein wrote in opposition to Nolte that:

"Not for nothing did Nolte let us know that the annihilation of the kulaks, the peasant middle class, had taken place from 1927 to 1930, before Hitler seized power, and that the destruction of the Old Bolsheviks and countless other victims of Stalin's insanity had happened between 1934 and 1938, before the beginning of Hitler's war. But Stalin's insanity was, in contrast to Hitler's insanity, a realist's insanity. After all this drivel comes one thing worth discussing: whether Stalin pumped up Hitler and whether Hitler pumped up Stalin. This can be discussed, but the discussion does not address the issue. It is indeed possible that Stalin was pleased by how Hitler treated his bosom buddy Ernst Röhm and the entire SA leadership in 1934. It is, not possible that Hitler began his war against Poland because he felt threatened by Stalin's regime... One does not have to agree in everything with Konrad Adenauer. But in the light of the crass tendency to deny the co-responsibility of the Prussian-German Wehrmacht ("The oath! The oath!") ones gains an understanding for the point of the view of the nonpatriot Adenauer that Hitler's Reich was the continuation of the Prussian-German regime"

In same essay, Augstein called Hillgruber "a constitutional Nazi". Augstein went on to call for Hillgruber to be fired from his post at the University of Cologne for being a "constitutional Nazi", and argued that there was no moral difference between Hillgruber and Hans Globke.

=== Thirty-Sixth Conference of German Historians, Trier, October 8, 1986 ===
The classicist Christian Meier, who was president of the German Historical Association at the time gave a speech on October 8, 1986, before that body, in which he criticized Nolte by declaring that the Holocaust was a "singular" event that "qualitatively surpassed" Soviet terror. Referring to Nolte's claims of being censored, Meier stated that Nolte had every right to ask questions, and that "no taboos will be established". Meier went to say:

"But the way Nolte poses these questions must be rejected simply because one should not reduce the impact of so elementary a truth: because German historical scholarship cannot be allowed to fall back into producing mindless nationalist apologies; and because it is important for a country to not deceive itself in such sensitive—ethically sensitive—areas of its history."

Meier wrote that question of comparing Hitler to Stalin was "not at all illegitimate" and should be studied before saying. "Even if our crimes were not singular, how would that be advantageous for us and our position in the world?" Meier in an attempt to cool down an increasingly heated debate argued that both sides were unable to listen to one another and German historians needed a "good dose of humor". Meier argued that it was unacceptable for historians to refuse to shake hands because of their disagreements over the Historikerstreit, saying this lack of civility and outright hatred was poisoning the profession of history in Germany. Meier stated that historians had to explain events that they may disapprove of to the best of their abilities, saying that not all scholarship was political. Meier used as an example that intentionist historians did not benefit conservatism, arguing the willingness of "power elites" to obey Hitler's orders does not support a conservative position. Meier defended Hillgruber, saying that the criticism of him by Habermas as a Nazi sympathizer was "nonsensical". Meier ended his speech with a call for German historians to continue to study the past in a professional manner, and argued that pluralism was necessary for the historians' craft.

=== "Under the Domination of Suspicion" ===
The conservative German historian Thomas Nipperdey in an essay first published in Die Zeit on October 17, 1986, accused Habermas of unjustly smearing Nolte and other right-wing historians via unscholarly and dubious methods. Nipperdey argued that Habermas had crossed a line in his criticism of Hillgruber, Nolte, Hildebrand and Stürmer. Nipperdey wrote that historians often revise the past and blasted the "critical" historians for their "moralizing" which did more to hinder than help understand German history. Nipperdey accused those historians "critical" of the German past of making that the "monopolistic claim" that its "damning judgments" of the German past were the only acceptable version of history. Nipperdey defended Stürmer's thesis that "there is a political right to memory" as it was a "simple fact". Nippedery wrote their history rested on the basis of "secured knowledge" with "stronger and weaker perspectives, more objective and less objective portrayals". Nipperdey concluded that the "great debate" started by Habermas was "unfortunate" and should not have been started.

=== "Auschwitz, an Asiatic Deed" ===
In letter to the editor of Der Spiegel on October 20, 1986, Imanuel Geiss accused Augstein and Habermas of trying to silence Nolte and Hillgruber. Geiss wrote that revision of history is "normal" and did not justify Augstein's essay. Geiss accused Augstein and Habermas of threatening "our scholarly and political pluralism". Geiss argued that it necessary for historians to reexamine the past, and that Nolte should be allowed to ask questions, saying that people "who desire to defend liberal values in this country must also practice with them in dealing with dissenters".

=== "Standing Things On Their Head" ===
In another feuilleton entitled "Standing Things On Their Heads" first published in Die Zeit on October 31, 1986, Nolte dismissed criticism of him by Habermas and Jäckel under the grounds that their writings were no different from what could find in an East German newspaper. Nolte contended that criticism over his use of the phrase "rat cage" was unwarranted since he was only using the phrase "rat cage" as an embodiment of the "Asiatic" horror he alleges Hitler felt about the Bolsheviks. Nolte wrote he was not trying to reintroduce the Nazi concept of "Jewish Bolshevism" and that "...even for the uninformed reader, the reference to the Chinese Cheka..." should have made clear that he was writing about overblown fears in Germany of the Bolsheviks instead of an objective reality. In reply to the criticism of Habermas and Jäckel, Nolte wrote:

"The Gulag Archipelago is primary to Auschwitz precisely because the Gulag was in the mind of the originator of Auschwitz; Auschwitz was not in the minds of the originators of the Gulag...If Jäckel proves his own definition for the singularity of the Final Solution, then I think that his concept simply elaborates what can be more briefly expressed with the term "racial murder". If, however, he wants to say that the German state, through the mouth of its Führer, unambiguously and publicly announced the decision that even Jewish women, children and infants were to be killed, then he has illustrated with one short phrase all that does not have to be demonstrated in the current intellectual climate, but can be "imputed". Hitler was certainly the most powerful man that has ever lived in Germany. But he was not powerful enough to ever publicly equate Bolshevism and Christianity, as he often did in his dinner conversations. He also not powerful enough to publicly demand or to justify, as Himmler often did in his circle of friends and associates, the murder of women and children. That, of course, is not proof of Hitler's "humanity", but rather of the remnants of the liberal system. The "extermination of the bourgeoisie" and the "liquidation of the kulaks" were, in contrast proclaimed quite publicly. And I am amazed at the coldheartedness with which Eberhard Jäckel says that not every single bourgeois was killed. Habermas's "expulsion of the kulaks" speaks for itself"

=== Interview with Andreas Hillgruber, 31 October 1986 ===
Hillgruber defended his call for the identification with the German troops fighting on the Eastern Front in an interview with the Rheinischer Merkur newspaper on 31 October 1986, on the ground that he was only trying "...to experience things from the perspective of the main body of the population". In the same 1986 interview, Hillgruber said it was necessary for a more nationalistic version of German history to be written because the East German government was embarking upon a more nationalist history, and if West German historians did not keep up with their East German counterparts in terms of German nationalism, it was inevitable that Germans would come to see the East German regime as the legitimate German state. Hillgruber was most furious with Augstein's "constitutional Nazi" line, and stated that he was considering suing Augstein for libel.

Replying to the interviewer's question about whether he thought the Holocaust was unique, Hillgruber stated:

...that the mass murder of the kulaks in the early 1930s, the mass murder of the leadership cadre of the Red Army in 1937–38, and the mass murder of the Polish officers who in September 1939 fell into Soviet hands are not qualitatively different in evaluation from the mass murder in the Third Reich.

In response to the interviewer's question about whatever he was a "revisionist" (by which the interviewer clearly meant negationist), Hillgruber stated that:

Revision of the results of scholarship is, as I said, in itself the most natural thing in the world. The discipline of history lives, like every discipline, on the revision through research of previous conceptualizations...Here I would like to say that in principle since the mid-1960s substantial revisions of various kinds have taken place and have rendered absurd the clichéd "image" that Habermas as a nonhistorian obviously possesses.

Replying to the interviewer's question about whether he wanted to see the revival of the original concept of the Sonderweg, that is of the idea of Germany as a great Central European power equally opposed to both the West and the East, Hillgruber denied that German history since 1945 had been that "golden", and claimed that his conception of the Central European identity he wanted to see revived was cultural, not political. Hillgruber called the idea of Germany as great power that would take on and being equally opposed to the United States and the Soviet Union as:

...historically hopeless because of the way the Second World War ended. To want to develop such a projection now would mean to bring the powers in the East and the West together against the Germans. I cannot imagine that anyone is earnestly striving for that. Reminiscences of good cooperation between the Germans and Slavic peoples in the middle of Europe before the First World War, and in part also still between the wars, are awakened whenever journalists or historians travel to Poland, Czechoslovakia, or Hungary. In that atmosphere it seems imperative to express how closely one feels connected to representatives of these nations. This is understandable, but it cannot all merge into a notion of "Central Europe" that could be misunderstood as taking up the old concept again, which is, as I have said, no longer realizable. In a word, I think the effort to latch on to the connections torn apart in 1945, because of the outcome of the war, and then in turn because of the Cold War, is a sensible political task, especially for West Germans.

=== "On the Public Use of History" ===
In another essay first published in the Die Zeit newspaper on 7 November 1986, Habermas wrote the central question about the memory of the Nazi past was: "In which way is the Nazi period going to be understood in the public consciousness?" Habermas wrote the Bitburg ceremony was meant to create nationalist feelings and a certain rehabilitation of the Nazi era with President Reagan and Chancellor Kohl laying wreaths at the cemetery to honor the Waffen-SS men buried there, but that for Nolte "Bitburg did not open the floodgates widely enough". Habermas wrote that: "This longing for the unframed memories from the perspective of the veterans can now be satisfied by reading Andreas Hillgruber's presentation of the events on the Eastern Front in 1944–45. The 'problem of identification', something that is unusual for an historian, poses itself to the author only because he wants to incorporate the perspective of the fighting troops and the affected civilian population".

Habermas argued that "we in Germany...must, undisguisedly and not simply intellectually, keep awake the memory of the suffering of those murdered at German hands". Habermas accused Nolte, Hildebrand and Fest of engaging in personal attacks instead of debating him. About Nolte's criticism over the line "expulsion of the kulaks", Habermas wrote: "I accept the criticism that, "annihilation", not "expulsion" of the kulaks is the appropriate description of this barbaric event. Enlightenment is a mutual undertaking. But the public settling of accounts by Nolte and Fest does not serve the end of enlightenment. They affect the political morality of a community that-after being liberated by Allied troops and without doing anything itself-has been established in the spirit of occidental conception of freedom, responsibility and self-determination".

=== "Eternally in the Shadow of Hitler?" ===
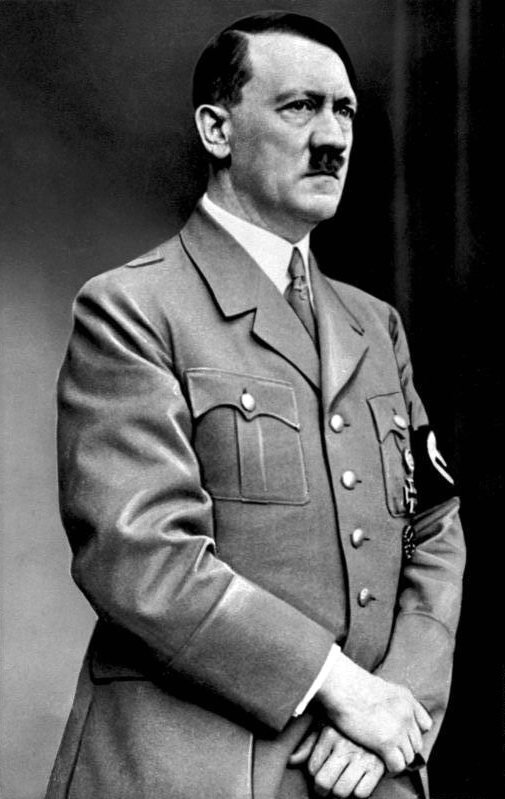
Adolf Hitler. The German historian Heinrich August Winkler wrote: "No German historian has ever accorded Hitler such a sympathetic treatment" as did Nolte.

In an essay first published in the Frankfurter Rundschau newspaper on November 14, 1986, Heinrich August Winkler wrote of Nolte's essay "The Past That Will Not Pass" that:

"Those who read the Frankfurter Allgemine all the way through to the culture section were able to read something under the title "The Past That Will Not Pass" that no German historian to date had noticed: that Auschwitz was only a copy of a Russian original-the Stalinist Gulag Archipelago. For fear of the Bolsheviks' Asiatic will to annihilate, Hitler himself committed an "Asiatic deed". Was the annihilation of the Jews a kind of putative self-defence? Nolte's speculation amounts to that."

Writing of Nolte's claim that Weizmann's letter was a "Jewish declaration of war", Winkler stated that "No German historian has ever accorded Hitler such a sympathetic treatment". Winkler wrote the current controversy over the memory of the Nazi past was caused by the controversy over Bitburg ceremony, writing that just as American had learned to forget about the My Lai massacre, the Bitburg ceremony was meant to allow German "to be able to feel an unbroken sense of pride". Winkler charged the editors of the Frankurter Allgemeine Zeitung in response to the Bitburg controversy had started a campaign meant to end any sense of guilt over the Nazi past. Winkler asked what was the point of these comparisons of Nazi Germany to the Soviet Union and Cambodia, writing: "Culturally, Germany is a country of the West. It participated in the European Enlightenment and in a long tradition of the rule of law. That is not the case for Russia and certainly not for Cambodia. The crimes of Stalin and the Khmer Rouge are in no way excused by this fact. But Hitler and his helpers must be judged by our Western norms. In this historical context, the systematic genocide of the Jews ordered by the German state-but also the murder of Sinti and Roma-is the greatest crime of the twentieth century, in fact of world history".

=== "Not A Concluding Remark" ===
In a later newspaper feuilleton first published in the Frankurter Allgemeine Zeitung on November 20, 1986, Meier again asserted that the Holocaust was a "singular" occurrence, but wrote that:

"It is to be hoped that Ernst Nolte's suggestion that we should remain more keenly aware of the various million-fold mass murders of this century bears fruit. When one seeks orientation about this-and about the role of mass murder in history-one is surprised by how difficult it is to find. This would appear to be an area that historical research should look into. By pursuing these questions, one can recognize more precisely the peculiarity of our century-and certain similarities in its "liquidations". But Nolte's hope to be able to attenuate this distressing aspect of our Nazi past will probably not succeed. If we, and much speaks for this, to prevent National Socialist history from becoming an enduring negative myth about absolute evil, then we will have to seek other paths".

Meier praised Nolte in his article "Standing Things On Their Head" for speaking to "modify" the thesis that he had introduced in "The Past That Will Not Pass" about the "causal nexus" by claiming the "causal nexus" only existed in Hitler's mind". Meier expressed his approval of Jäckel's argument for the "singularity" of the Holocaust, writing that "industrial extermination" by Nazi Germany was a "qualitative leap". In response to Fest's argument that it was racist not to compare Germany with Cambodia, Meier stated that Germany by being a First World nation had "duties" that a Third World nation like Cambodia did not. Meier wrote the Historikerstreit was really about the future, namely how to "live with a past that is so deeply anchored in our consciousness?". Meier wrote that historians are always influenced by the present and historians "should also be able to discern uncomfortable truths". About Stürmer's call for history as an unifying force to hold together West German society for the Cold War, Meier wrote that Habermas had the right to challenge him, but did not understand the Atlanticist Stürmer was not an advocate of Germany as a Central European power as he alleged. Meier called Stürmer's theories as "probably not...illegitimate" but argued that a democratic society was always going to have diverse opinions. Meier ended his essay that the problems faced by Germans was: "How are going to live with this history and what conclusions can we draw from it?...We will make no progress if we use the Nazi past as a club in partisan disputes...But it is to be wished that the center, especially will be strong, for in the past, the political middle has always been capable of providing reasonable solutions, results and maxims."

In response to Meier's article, Nolte wrote in a letter to the editor of the Frankfurter Allgemeine Zeitung published on December 6, 1986, that he did not "defuse" the thesis he presented in his essay "The Past That Will Not Pass", but merely corrected a few mistakes in his essay "Standing Things On Their Head".

=== "Makeup Artists are Creating a New Identity" ===
The political scientist Kurt Sontheimer in an essay first published in the Rheinischer Merkur newspaper on November 21, 1986, accused Nolte and company of attempting to create a new "national consciousness" meant to sever the Federal Republic's "intellectual and spiritual ties to the West". Sontheimer accused Hillgruber of being guilty of "revisionism" (by which Sontheimer clearly meant negationism) in his writings on German history. Sontheimer wrote it was impossible for historians to claim "pure and strict scholarly research" while at the same time engaging in a political project like attempting to shape national identity. Sontheimer wrote the political basis of the Federal Republic founded in 1949 was in the Western tradition of liberal democracy and without mentioning Stürmer by name declared that the search for some basis in German national identity in the Imperial period to provide a "unified an understanding of history as possible" was "dubious" because there was "so little to be found there" and "because every attempt to provide political meaning via our predemocratic national history threatens to end the consensus of the postwar era". Sonthemier wrote that the great achievements of German historians since 1945 was seeking to understand why the Weimar Republic failed and how Nazi Germany came to be, stating:"We were attempting to overcome the past, not to invoke it...I cannot see what better lesson those who are struggling to provide meaning through history can offer us".

=== "He Who Wants to Escape the Abyss" ===
In another feuilleton entitled "He Who Wants to Escape the Abyss" first published in Die Welt on November 22, 1986, Hildebrand argued in defense of Nolte that the Holocaust was one of a long sequence of genocides in the 20th century and asserted that Nolte was only attempting the "historicization" of National Socialism that Broszat had called for Hildebrand accused Habermas of engaging in "scandalous" attacks on Hillgruber. Hildebrand claimed that "Habermas's criticism is based in no small part on quotations that unambiguously falsify the matter". Hildebrand wrote that historians are engaged in a continuous search for the truth, which always involves revision, and the historiography of the Third Reich was no different. Hildebrand wrote that Habermas with support from Mommsen and Broszat was attempting to stop the normal course of scholarship for political reasons. Hildebrand wrote that it was "incomprehensible" that Meier found it a matter of secondary concern that Habermas had selectively quoted Hillgruber, writing that Habermas was a highly dishonest man. Hildebrand wrote: "Every student who treated literature in the "Habermas way" would fail his exam!"

Hildebrand wrote the question of the "singularity" of the Holocaust needed to be questioned and complained of a "one-sidedness" that led historians to see Nazi Germany as the greater evil. Hildebrand wrote the "intensity of annihilation" in Nazi policies "appears comparable with the Soviet Union of Stalin". Hildebrand argued that the Hitler and Stalin regimes belonged to the "epochal" movements of the 20th century and should be studied together to fill in the "gaps". Hildebrand argued the Holocaust was both "singular" and belonged to a broad sweep of history beginning with the Armenian genocide and ending with the "regime of terror of Cambodian Stone Age Communism". Hildebrand wrote that scholars like himself were merely trying to begin the "historization" of National Socialism that Broszat had called for, and were being attacked because they threatened the "intellectual hegemony" of Habermas. Hildebrand wrote that Habermas did not really practice philosophy, but instead "sophistry", having a "limited" understanding of the world, which caused him to start a debate "without sufficient reason". Hildebrand added that it was wrong for historians like Mommsen and Broszat to support Habermas.

=== "How Much History Weighs" ===
In an essay entitled "How Much History Weighs" published in the Frankfurter Allgemeine Zeitung on November 26, 1986, Stürmer wrote that France was a major power in the world because the French had a history to be proud of, and claimed that West Germany could only play the same role in the world if only they had the same national consensus about pride in their history as did the French. Stürmer wrote French leaders from de Gaulle onward wanted the Germans to be a proud and self-confident people in order to play their proper role in the Franco-German alliance that dominated the European Economic Community, asking why so many Germans found that so difficult. Citing a novel by a French industrialist Alain Minic, Le Syndrome Finlandais, Stürmer warned that German "ecological pacifism" would lead to West Germany and hence all of Western Europe being "Finlandized" if the Germans did not have a national identity that inspired pride in being German.

As the example of the sort of history that he wanted to see written in Germany, Stürmer used Fernand Braudel's The Identity of France volumes. Stürmer wrote that Braudel and the other historians of the Annales School had made geography the centre of their studies of French and European history while at the same time promoting a sense of French identity that gave the French a history to be proud of. Stürmer went on to argue that the German people had not had a really positive view of their past since the end of the Holy Roman Empire, and this lack of a German identity to be proud of was responsible for all of the disasters of German history since then. Stürmer asserted "All of our interpretations of Germany had collapsed". As a result, he claimed that at present, the German people were living in historical "rubble", and that the Federal Republic was doomed unless the Germans once again had a sense of history that provided the necessary sense of national identity and pride Stürmer warned that the West Germans would face a "Communist future" if the German people did not have a history that provided for a self-confident national identity.

=== Hillgruber's letter to the FAZ, 29 November 1986 ===
Responding to Meier's comment about what why he chose to "identify" with German troops in a letter to the editor of the Frankfurter Allgemeine Zeitung on 29 November 1986, Hillgruber wrote:

Is it really so difficult for a German historian (even if he is, like Meier, a specialist in ancient history) to realize why the author of an essay about the collapse in the East in 1944–45 identifies with the efforts of the German populace? I identified with the German efforts not only in East Prussia, but also in Silesia, East Brandenburg and Pomerania (Meier's homeland) to protect themselves from what threatened them and to save as many people as possible.

=== Löwenthal's letter to the FAZ, 29 November 1986 ===
The German political scientist Richard Löwenthal noted that news of Soviet dekulakization and the Holodomor did not reach Germany until 1941, so that Soviet atrocities could not possibly have influenced the Germans as Nolte claimed. Löwenthal argued in a letter to the editor of the Frankfurter Allgemeine Zeitung on 29 November 1986 for the "fundamental difference" in mass murder in Germany and the Soviet Union, and against the "balancing" out of various crimes in the 20th century. Löwenthal contended that comparisons between Hitler and Stalin were appropriate, but comparisons between Hitler and Lenin were not. For Löwenthal, the decisive factor that governed Lenin's conduct was that right from the onset when he took power, he was involved in civil wars within Russia Löwenthal argued that "Lenin's battle to hold on to power" did not comprise "one-sided mass annihilation of defenceless people" Speaking of the Russian Civil War, Löwenthal argued that "In all these battles there were heavy losses on both sides and horrible torture and murders of prisoners" Speaking of the differences between Lenin and Stalin, Löwenthal argued that "What Stalin did from 1929 on was something entirely different" Löwenthal argued that with dekulakization, the so-called "kulaks" were to be destroyed by the Soviet state as:

a hindrance to forced collectivization. They were not organized. They had not fought. They were shipped to far-away concentration camps and in general were not killed right away, but were forced to suffer conditions that led in the course of time to a miserable death

Löwenthal wrote that:

What Stalin did from 1929 both against peasants and against various other victims, including leading Communists... and returned soldiers, was in fact historically new in its systematic inhumanity, and to this extent comparable with the deeds of Hitler. Certainly, Hitler, like all his contemporaries, had a preconception of the civil wars of Lenin's time. Just as certainly his own ideas about the total annihilation of the Jews, the Gypsies, the "unworthy of life", and so on, were independent of Stalin's example. At any rate the idea of total annihilation of the Jews had already been developed in the last work of Hitler's mentor, Dietrich Eckart, who died in 1924. For the reference to this source, which leaves no room for "balancing", I am grateful to Ernst Nolte's first large book, which appeared in 1963, Faschismus in seiner Epoche [Fascism in Its Epoch]

== Historikerstreit in the winter of 1986–87 ==
=== "Neither Denial Nor Forgetfulness Will Free Us" ===
Hans Mommsen's twin brother, Wolfgang Mommsen, in an essay entitled "Neither Denial nor Forgetfulness Will Free Us" (Frankfurter Rundschau, 1 December 1986), argued that the debate about the planned German Historical Museum in West Berlin—which was to cover German history from antiquity to the present—and the planned House of History in Bonn—which was to cover the Federal Republic from 1949 to the present—showed the German people were deeply interested in their history.

In Mommsen's view, the decisive issue was whether the Federal Republic was a continuation of the Reich that had existed from 1871 to 1945 or not. He argued that at first the continuity thesis dominated, as shown by the lavish celebrations of the 150th anniversary of Bismarck's birthday in 1965, but as a younger generation came of age, a more critical attitude towards the past emerged. He wrote further that German reunification "would presume the collapse of the Soviet empire, a premise unthinkable at the time". As a result, since German reunification was impossible in the 1950s–60s, together with the resumption of Germany as a great power, led West Germans to embrace the idea of integration into the European Economic Community and NATO as the best substitutes. Adenauer's policies of integration into the EEC and NATO suggested that the only role possible for the Federal Republic was at best as a middle-size world power whose influence stemmed from working with other Western powers. The policies of Western integration caused the idea of a continuity of German history to lose its appeal to the younger generation of West Germans, he wrote, leading to the idea popular by the late 1960s that the state founded in 1949 represented discontinuity.

Finally, Mommsen maintained that the discontinuity thesis led to the younger generation of West Germans to become more critical of the old Reich that had existed from 1871 to 1945. Mommsen argued that for those nationalists still attached to the idea of national continuity, these were painful developments, noting that an article by Nolte in Die Zeit had its title "Against Negative Nationalism in Interpreting History" where Nolte lashed out against historians critical of the German past. Mommsen argued much of the writing by Nolte, Hildebrand, and Stürmer was clearly aiming to provide for a version of history that celebrated the continuities of German history while trying to get around the more unpleasant aspects of the German Empire and even more so Nazi Germany. Mommsen wrote that Nolte, Hildebrand, Stürmer and Hillgruber were in different ways seeking a version of history that allowed for the continuity of German history to be celebrated despite the Nazi era. Mommsen argued that the Nazi period, was however painful and distasteful, part of German history and the memory of which was something all Germans had to face. Mommsen wrote the Bitburg ceremony of 1985 was intended to "be a kind of line drawn under that segment of German history. But it turned out that, at least in terms of intellectual honesty, that cannot be done, and that no matter what we do, other peoples will not be willing to accept such an act from us".

Mommsen charged that Nolte was attempting to egregiously whitewash the German past. Mommsen argued that Nolte was attempting a "justification" of Nazi crimes and making "inappropriate" comparisons of the Holocaust with other genocides. Mommsen wrote that Nolte intended to provide the sort of history that would allow Germans to feel good about being Germans by engaging in "...an explanatory strategy that...will be seen as a justification of National Socialist crimes by all those who are still under the influence of the extreme anti-Soviet propaganda of National Socialism". Mommsen wrote about Hillgruber's demands that historians identified with the "justified" German defence of the Eastern Front that:

Andreas Hillgruber recently attempted to accord a relative historical justification to the Wehrmacht campaign in the East and the desperate resistance of the army in the East after the summer of 1944. He argued that the goal was to prevent the German civilian population from falling into the hands of the Red Army. However, the chief reason, he argued, was that the defense of German cities in the East had become tantamount to defending Western civilization. In light of the Allied war goals, which, independent of Stalin's final plans, envisioned breaking up Prussia and destroying the defensive position of a strong, Prussian-led Central European state that could serve as a bulwark against Bolshevism, the continuation of the war in the East was justified from the viewpoint of those involved. It was, as Hillgruber's argument would have it, also justified even from today's standpoint, despite the fact that prolonging the war in the East meant that the gigantic murder machinery of the Holocaust would be allowed to continue to run. All this, the essay argued, was justified as long as the fronts held. Hillgruber's essay is extremely problematic when viewed from the perspective of a democratically constituted community that orients itself towards Western moral and political standards.

There is no getting around the bitter truth that the defeat of National Socialist Germany was not only in the interest of the peoples who were bulldozed by Hitler's war and of the peoples who were selected by his henchmen for annihilation or oppression or exploitation – it was also in the interest of the Germans. Accordingly, parts of the gigantic scenery of the Second World War were, at least as far as we were concerned, totally senseless, even self-destructive. We cannot escape this bitter truth by assigning partial responsibility to other partners who took part in the war.

Mommsen wrote the attempts to "strengthen" the Federal Republic by writing nationalistic histories that meant to end any sense of German shame would in fact have the exact opposite effect.

Also in an essay published in the December 1, 1986 edition of The New Republic, the American historian Charles S. Maier rejected Nolte's claim of moral equivalence between the actions of the Soviet Communists and German Nazis under the grounds that while the former were extremely brutal, the latter sought the total extermination of a people, namely the Jews.

=== "What May Not, Cannot Be" ===
The German historian Horst Möller in an essay entitled "What May Not Be, Cannot Be" first published in the December 1986 edition of Beiträge zur Konfliktforschung magazine argued that Nolte was not attempting to "excuse" Nazi crimes by comparing it with other crimes of others, but was instead trying to explain the Nazi war-crimes. Möller wrote that Habermas was highly prejudiced by his left-wing beliefs and did not really understand the work of Nolte, Hillgruber and Hildebrand, whom Möller wrote were all serious historians. Möller argued that Nolte was only attempting to explain "irrational" events rationally, and that the Nazis really did believe that they were confronted with a world Jewish-Bolshevik conspiracy that was out to destroy Germany. Möller asserted that all historical events are unique and thus "singular". Möller defended Hillgruber by arguing that:

Hillgruber comes to the conclusion, on the basis of British files that were declassified in the meantime, that the destruction of the German Reich was planned before the mass murder of the Jews became known - and that the mass murder does not explain the end of the Reich ... It is hardly disputable that the attempt to hold the Eastern Front as long as possible against the Red Army meant protection for the German civilian populace in the eastern provinces against murders, rapes, plundering and expulsions by Soviet troops. It was not simply Nazi propaganda against these "Asiatic hordes" that caused this climate of fear. It was the concrete examples of Nemmersdorf in October 1944, mentioned by Hillgruber, that had brought the horror of the future occupation into view.

Möller argued that Habermas was guilty to trying to justify Soviet crimes by writing of the "expulsion of the kulaks". Möller wrote that Habermas was either "ignorant or shameless" in accusing Nolte, Hillgruber and Hildebrand of being Nazi apologists. Möller wrote that Hans Mommsen and Martin Broszat were the real "revisionists" by arguing for a functionalist theories. Möller ended his essay that the Nolte, Hillgruber and Hildebrand had made "essential contributions" to the historiography of the Third Reich and should not be the victims of "character assassination" as he alleged Habermas was guilty of.

=== "Jürgen Habermas, Karl-Heinz Janßen, and the Enlightenment in the Year 1986" ===
In an essay meant to reply to Habermas's criticism entitled "Jürgen Habermas, Karl-Heinz Janßen, and the Enlightenment in the Year 1986" first published in the right-wing Geschichte in Wissenschaft und Unterricht (History In Academics and Instruction) magazine in December 1986, Hillgruber accused Habermas of engaging in "scandalous" methods of attack. Hillgruber lent Nolte support by commenting that what was going on in the Soviet Union in the early 1920s may had influenced Hitler's thinking on the Jews In answer to Habermas's criticism of the sub-title of his book, Hillgruber argued that the title of his Holocaust essay, "Der geschichtliche Ort der Judenvernichtung" (The Historical Locus Of The Annihilation Of The Jews) and the first sentence of his book, in which he spoke of the "murder of the Jews in the territory controlled by National Socialist Germany", disproved Habermas's point. In particular, Hillgruber was highly furious over the sentence about "tried and true higher-ups of the NSDAP" that Habermas had created by selective editing of Hillgruber's book. Hillgruber claimed that Habermas was waging a "campaign of character assassination against Michael Stürmer, Ernst Nolte, Klaus Hildebrand and me in the style of the all-too-familiar APO pamphlets of the late 1960s" [Hillgruber was attempting to associate Habermas with the APO here]. Hillgruber described Habermas as a kind of left-wing literary hit-man who had asked to "take apart" Zweierlei Untergang by Karl-Heinz Janßen, the editor of the culture section of the Die Zeit newspaper.

Reacting to Habermas's criticism that in the Holocaust essay in Zweierlei Untergang that his use of the word "could" in a sentence where Hillgruber wrote that Hitler believed only through genocide of the Jews could Germany become a great power, which Habermas claimed might have indicated that Hillgruber shared Hitler's viewpoint, Hillgruber took much umbrage to Habermas's claim. Hillgruber stated that what he wrote in his Holocaust essay was that the German leadership in 1939 was divided into three factions. One, centred on the Nazi Party and the SS, saw the war as a chance to carry out the "racial reorganization" of Europe via mass expulsions and German colonization, whose roots Hillgruber traced to the war aims of the Pan-German League in the First World War. Another faction comprised the traditional German elites in the military, the diplomatic service and the bureaucracy, who saw the war as a chance to destroy the settlement established by the Treaty of Versailles and to establish the world dominance that Germany had sought in the First World War. And finally, there was Hitler's "race" program, which sought the genocide of the Jews as the only way to ensure that Germany would be a world power. Hillgruber insisted that he was only describing Hitler's beliefs, and did not share them. Hillgruber argued that only by reading his second essay about the Holocaust in Zweierlei Untergang could one understand the first essay about the "collapse" on the Eastern Front. Hillgruber compared the feelings of Germans about the lost eastern territories to the feelings of the French about their lost colonies in Indochina. Hillgruber claimed that, when writing about the end of the "German East" in 1945, to understand the "sense of tragedy" that surrounded the matter one had to take the side of the German civilians who were menaced by the Red Army, and the German soldiers fighting to protect them. Hillgruber went on to write that Habermas was seeking to censor him by criticizing him for taking the German side when discussing the last days of the Eastern Front. Replying to Habermas's charge that he was a "neo-conservative", Hillgruber wrote:

How does he come to come categorize my work as having so-called neoconservative tendencies? For decades I have never made any bones about my basic conservative position. Deeply suspicious as I am of all "leftist" and other world-improving utopias, I will gladly let the label "conservative" apply to me, meant though it is as a defamation. But what is the meaning of the prefix "neo"? No one "challenges" this new "battle" label, so often seen these days, in order to turn this APO jargon against the inventor of the label.

Hillgruber argued that there was a contradiction in Habermas's claim that he was seeking to revive the original concept of the Sonderweg, that is, the ideology of Germany as a great Central European power that was neither of the West or the East which would mean closing Germany off to the culture of the West while at the same time accusing him of trying to create a "NATO philosophy". Hillgruber took the opportunity to once more restate his belief that there was no moral difference between the actions of the German Nazis and the Soviet Communists, and questioned whether the Holocaust was a "singular" event. Finally, Hillgruber accused Habermas of being behind the "agitation and psychic terror" suffered by non-Marxist professors in the late 1960s, and warned him that if he was trying to bring back "...that unbearable atmosphere that ruled in those years at West German universities, then he is deluding himself".

=== "The Nazi Era-A Case of Normal Tyranny?" ===
In an essay entitled "The Nazi Era-A Case of Normal Tyranny?" first published in Die neue Gesellschaft magazine in late 1986, the political scientist Walter Euchner wrote that Nolte was wrong when he wrote of Hitler's alleged terror of the Austrian Social Democratic Party parades before 1914, and argued that Social Democratic parties in both Germany and Austria were fundamentally humane and pacifistic, instead of the terrorist-revolutionary entities that Nolte alleged them to be. Euchner wrote that:

"Politicians like Karl Kautsky and Eduard Bernstein certainly did not inspire anyone to phantasies about annihilation. For these Hitler needed neither prewar Marxism nor the Gulag Archipelago. They were in fact a product of his insanity."

Euchner went to argue that there was no comparison of German and Soviet crimes in his view because Germany had had an "outstanding intellectual heritage" and the Nazis had carried out a policy of genocide with the "voluntary support of a substantial part of the traditional elites". Eulchner wrote that Hildebrand's claim that the Allied powers had "horrifying" war aims was meant to show there everyone was equally evil in World War II and no one had the right "to point his finger at others", which Euchner wrote was clearly meant to end any reason for to see the Holocaust as special.

=== "Only by Facing the Past Can We Be Free" ===
The journalist Robert Leicht in an essay first published in Die Zeit on December 26, 1986, asserted that Nolte was attempting to end the German shame over the Holocaust by making "absurd" arguments. Leicht argued that Stalin was not the "real" cause of the Holocaust as Nolte alleged, and that because the Holocaust was without precedent in German history, it was indeed "singular". Leicht complained about the apologist effect of lines like evil "done in the German name" as making it sound as if "the Germans had not done these things themselves but had hired a subcontractor". Leicht argued that Germans "cannot erect straight genealogical trees" with regards to their history as the Nazi period could not be a source of pride, meaning there was always going to be a "broken relationship" with their history. Leicht asserted that the Nazi era was a part of the German past that justifiably inspired shame, and there was nothing that historians and politicians could do to end this shame, as the Historikerstreit and the Bitburg controversy had just proved. Leicht argued that aspects of German history that made Hitler possible could not be celebrated today, that the "historiczation" of National Socialism as suggested by Broszat was necessary, and that Germans should resist the appeal of myths intended to make the shame caused by the Nazi era go away. Leicht ended his essay by writing "we also stand in the shadow of a history that we can no longer heal. And thus the imperative of the Enlightenment is all the more pressing".

=== "Those Who Refused to Go Along" ===
The political scientist Joachim Perels in an essay first published in the Frankfurter Rundschau newspaper on December 27, 1986, argued that Nolte's bias could be seen in that Nolte was full of fury against the "permanent status of privilege" that he alleged that those who were descendants of Nazi victims were said to enjoy while at the same time having the utmost sympathy for Hitler and his alleged terror of Bolshevik "Asiatic deeds". Perels thought it was outrageous for Hillgruber to praise those German officers who stayed loyal to Hitler during the July 20th putsch as making the right moral choice, and felt that Hillgruber had slandered those Germans who chose to resist the Nazi regime as traitors who let down their country in its hour of need. Perels wrote that Hillgruber's identification with those Wehrmacht officers who stayed loyal to Hitler with Germany meant excluding all of the Germans suffering in the concentration camps in 1944–45 from history. In the same way, Perels wrote that Meier had praised those Germans who joined the Wehrmacht as doing their duty to the Fatherland which Perels felt disparaged those Germans who refused to join the Wehrmacht and were sent to concentration camps. Perels felt that both Meier and even more so Hillgruber with his call for historians to "identify" with the Wehrmacht had equated Germany with those who fought for Hitler, charging this way of writing history excluded those Germans opposed to Hitler.

Perels used as an example of what he arguing against that in 1956 the West German Supreme Court upheld the death sentences handed down to Lutheran pastor Dietrich Bonhoeffer and the lawyer Hans von Dohnányi as legal, under the grounds that Hitler was the legal leader of Germany and Bonhoeffer and Dohnayi were guilty of treason by working for his overthrow, meaning their executions by the SS were lawful and the judge and prosecutor in their case did nothing wrong. Perels wrote that Hillgruber's book Zweierlei Untergang which praised those German officers who stayed to Hitler as making the correct ethical choice served to put him in the same moral camp as the judges of the Supreme Court who regarded Bonhoeffer and Dohnányi as traitors who were properly executed. Perels argued it was time for historians to have a "serious discussion about the hereditary encumbrance of National Socialism". In this regard, Perels argued that far being "The Past That Will Not Go Away", that the memory of the Nazi period was a subject that the Germans were only tentatively even in the 1980s starting to explore.

=== "On the Historikerstreit" ===
In an essay first published in the Evangelische Kommentare magazine in February 1987, Geiss called Nolte's claim about Weizmann's letter being a Jewish "declaration of war" as "hair-raising nonsense" Geiss wrote that both essays in Zweierlei Untergang were "respectable", but that it was "irritating" and ill-advised on the part of Hillgruber to publish them together, with the implied moral equivalence between the expulsion of the Germans from Eastern Europe, and the genocide of the Jews. Geiss accused Habermas of engaging in a "malicious insinuation" in his attacks on Hillgruber. Geiss wrote that Hillgruber's demand that historians had to side with German troops fighting on the Eastern Front was problematic, but it did "...not justify the merciless severity, almost in the tone of an Old Testament prophet with which Habermas goes after this dissident historian".

=== Habermas's Note of 23 February 1987 ===
Habermas in "Note" of 23 February 1987 responded to the criticism of Hillgruber and Hildebrand of dishonesty by noting a small error in his article "Damage Control in German History" that both Hillgruber and Hildebrand ignored. Habermas responded to the criticism of Stürmer denying that he was seeking "endow history with meaning" by citing his remark from his 1986 book Dissonanzen des Fortschritts: "It appears necessary to abandon the merely apparent difference between social history and cultural history and to understand that at the end of the twentieth century humans residing in industrial cultures must more than ever before seek and comprehend their historical identity in order not to lose themselves". About the line of "true and tried" Nazi officials, Habermas justified the procedure under the grounds that in general Hillgruber spoke warmly of the role that Nazi Party officials played in helping to sustain the "justified" defense in eastern Germany in Zweierlei Untergang, writing that Hillgruber's approach to the subject is one where the war effort of Nazi Germany is applauded.

Habermas went on to argue that: "And in any case, this ridiculous dispute about words and secondary virtues just confirms Hillgruber's lack of objectivity about this entire sphere. This a case of praising the fire department that set the fire". Habermas ended his article with the remark that Hillgruber was an extremely shoddy historian, claiming that Hillgruber's charge that he was a leading 60s radical who was behind "...the agitation unleashed by extreme leftists at West German universities and on the psychic terror aimed at individual non-Marxist colleagues" was simply not supported by the facts, and told Hillgruber to read one of his own books about his actions in the late 1960s before making such claims.

=== Nolte's Note of 15 April 1987 ===
Nolte in his "Note" of 15 April 1987 wrote his principal objection to the subtitle to Piper's book, saying he wanted it to be the "Documentation of the Controversy Surrounding the Preconditions and the Character of the 'Final Solution of the Jewish Question'" instead of "The Documentation of the Controversy Concerning the Singularity of the National Socialist Annihilation of the Jews".

=== Fest Postscript, 21 April 1987 ===
Nolte's admirer Joachim Fest was later to argue in his "Postscript" of April 21, 1987 that Nolte was motivated by purely scholarly concerns, and was only attempting the "historicization" of National Socialism that Martin Broszat called for Fest wrote that in his view:

"In its substance, the dispute was initiated by Ernst Nolte's question whether Hitler's monstrous will to annihilate the Jews, judging from its origin, came from early Viennese impressions or, what is more likely, from later Munich experiences, that is, whether Hitler was an originator or simply being reactive. Despite all the consequences that arose from his answer, Nolte's question was, in fact, a purely academic exercise. The conclusions would probably not have caused as much controversy if they had been accompanied by special circumstances"

Fest accused Habermas and his allies of attempting to silence those whose views they disliked. Fest wrote that:

"Standing on the one side, to simplify, are those who want to preserve Hitler and National Socialism as a kind of antimyth that can be used for political intentions—the theory of a conspiracy on the part of the political right, to which Nolte, Stürmer, and Hillgruber are linked. This becomes evident in the defamatory statements and the expansion of the dispute to the historical museums. It is doubtless no coincidence that Habermas, Jäckel, Mommsen and others become involved in the recent election campaign in this way. Many statements in favor of the pluralistic character of scholarship and in favor of an ethos representing a republic of learned men reveal themselves as merely empty phrases to the person who has an overview of these things"

Fest argued that:

"Strictly speaking, Nolte did nothing but take up the suggestion by Broszat and others that National Socialism be historicized. It was clear to anyone with any sense for the topic-and Broszat's opening article made it evident that he too had recognized it-that this transition would be beset with difficulties. But that the most incensed objections would come from those who from the beginning were the spokesmen of historicization-this was no less surprising then the recognition that yesterday's enlighteners are today's intolerant mythologues, people who want to forbid questions from being posed"

Fest predicated that scholarship in the future will vindicate Nolte and called Habermas and his allies "the advocates of a hopeless cause".

=== The controversy over Nolte's thesis ===
These views ignited a firestorm of controversy. Most historians in West Germany and virtually all historians outside Germany condemned Nolte's interpretation as factually incorrect, and as coming dangerously close to justifying the Holocaust. Many historians, such as Steven T. Katz, claimed that Nolte's "Age of Genocide" concept "trivialized" the Holocaust by reducing it to one of just many 20th century genocides. A common line of criticism were that Nazi crimes, above all the Holocaust, were singularly and uniquely evil, and could not be compared to the crimes of others. Some historians such as Hans-Ulrich Wehler were most forceful in arguing that the sufferings of the "kulaks" deported during the Soviet "dekulakization" campaign of the early 1930s were in no way analogous to the suffering of the Jews deported in the early 1940s. Many were angered by Nolte's claim that "the so-called annihilation of the Jews under the Third Reich was a reaction or a distorted copy and not a first act or an original", with many such as Ian Kershaw wondering why Nolte spoke of the "so-called annihilation of the Jews" in describing the Holocaust. Some of the historians who denounced Nolte's views included Hans Mommsen, Jürgen Kocka, Detlev Peukert, Martin Broszat, Hans-Ulrich Wehler, Michael Wolffsohn, Heinrich August Winkler, Wolfgang Mommsen, Karl Dietrich Bracher and Eberhard Jäckel. Much (though not all) of the criticism of Nolte came from historians who favored either the Sonderweg (Special Way) and/or intentionalist/functionalist interpretations of German history. From the advocates of the Sonderweg approach came the criticism that Nolte's views had totally externalized the origins of the National Socialist dictatorship to the post-1917 period, whereas in their view, the roots of the Nazi dictatorship can be traced back to the 19th century German Empire. In particular, it was argued that within the virulently and ferociously anti-Semitic Völkisch movement, which first arose in the latter half of the 19th century, the ideological seeds of the Shoah were already planted. From both functionalist and intentionist historians came the similar criticism that the motives and momentum for the "Final Solution to the Jewish Question" came primarily from within Germany, not as the result of external events. Intentionalists argued that Hitler did not need the Russian Revolution to provide him with a genocidal mindset, while functionalists argued it was the unstable power structure and bureaucratic rivalries of the Third Reich, which led to genocide of the Jews. Another line of criticism centered around Nolte refusal to say just precisely when he believes the Nazis decided upon genocide, and have pointed out that at various times, Nolte has implied the decision for genocide was taken in the early 1920s, or the early 1930s or the 1940s.

Coming to Nolte's defence were the journalist Joachim Fest, the philosopher Helmut Fleischer, and the historians' Klaus Hildebrand, Rainer Zitelmann, Hagen Schulze, Thomas Nipperdey and Imanuel Geiss. The latter was unusual amongst Nolte's defenders as Geiss was normally identified with the left, while the rest of Nolte's supporters were seen as either on the right or holding centrist views. In response to Wehler's book, Geiss later published a book entitled Der Hysterikerstreit. Ein unpolemischer Essay (The Hysterical Dispute An Unpolemical Essay) in which he largely defended Nolte against Wehler's criticisms. Geiss wrote Nolte's critics had "taken in isolation" his statements and were guilty of being "hasty readers"

Further adding to the controversy was a statement by Nolte in June 1987 that Adolf Hitler "created the state of Israel", and that "the Jews would eventually come to appreciate Hitler as the individual who contributed more than anyone else to the creation of the state of Israel". As a result of that remark, Nolte was sacked from his position as chief editor of the German language edition of Theodore Herzl's letters by the Deutsche Forschungsgemeinschaft (German Research Community), the group that was responsible for the financing of the Herzl papers project. Another controversial claim by Nolte was his statement that massacres of the Volksdeutsch minority in Poland after the German invasion of 1939 were an act of genocide by the Polish government, and thereby justified the German aggression as part of an effort to save the German minority. Another contentious set of claims by Nolte was his argument that the film Shoah showed that it was "probable" that the SS were just as much victims of the Holocaust as were the Jews, and the Polish victims of the Germans were just as much anti-Semites as the Nazis, thereby proving it was unjust to single out Germans for criticism. Nolte claimed that more "Aryans" than Jews were murdered at Auschwitz, a fact overlooked because most Holocaust research comes "to an overwhelming degree from Jewish authors". Likewise, Nolte has implied that the atrocities committed by the Germans in Poland and the Soviet Union were justified by earlier Polish and Soviet atrocities. In response, Nolte's critics have argued that though there were massacres of ethnic Germans in Poland in 1939 (about 4,000 to 6,000 being killed after the German invasion), these were not part of a genocidal program on the part of the Poles, but were rather the ad hoc reaction of panic-stricken Polish troops to (sometimes justified) rumors of fifth column activities on the part of the volksdeutsch, and can not in any way be compared to the more systematic brutality of the German occupiers towards the Poles, which led to a 25% population reduction in Poland during the war. Another contentious statement by Nolte was his argument that the Wannsee Conference of 1942 never occurred. Nolte wrote that too many Holocaust historians were "biased" Jewish historians, whom Nolte strongly hinted manufactured the minutes of the Wannsee conference. The British historian Richard J. Evans was highly offended by Nolte's claims that German massacres of Soviet Jews carried out by the Einsatzgruppen and the Wehrmacht were a legitimate "preventive security" measure that was not a war crime. Nolte wrote that during World War I, the Germans would have been justified in exterminating the entire Belgian people as an act of "preventive security" because of franc-tireur attacks, and thus the Rape of Belgium was an act of German restraint; similarly, Nolte wrote that because many Soviet partisans were Jews, the Germans were within their rights in seeking to kill every single Jewish man, women and child they encountered in Russia as an act of "preventive security".

In particular, controversy centered on an argument of Nolte's 1985 essay "Between Myth and Revisionism" from the book Aspects of the Third Reich, first published in German as "Die negative Lebendigkeit des Dritten Reiches" ("The Negative Legend of the Third Reich") as an opinion piece in the Frankfurter Allgemeine Zeitung on 24 July 1980, but which did not attract widespread attention until 1986 when Jürgen Habermas criticized the essay in a feuilleton piece. Nolte had delivered a lecture at the Siemans-Sitftung in 1980, and excerpts from his speech were published in the Frankfurter Allgemeine Zeitung without attracting controversy. In his essay, Nolte argued that if the PLO were to destroy Israel, then the subsequent history written in the new Palestinian state would portray the former Israeli state in the blackest of colors with no references to any of the positive features of the defunct state. In Nolte's opinion, a similar situation of history written only by the victors exists in regards to the history of Nazi Germany. Many historians, such as British historian Richard J. Evans, have asserted that, based on this statement, Nolte appears to believe that the only reason why Nazism is regarded as evil is because Germany lost World War II, with no regard for the Holocaust. Klaus Hildebrand called in a review in the Historische Zeitschrift journal on 2 April 1986 called Nolte's essay "Between Myth and Revisionism" "trailbrazing". In the same review of Nolte's essay "Between Myth and Revisionism", Hildebrand argued Nolte had in a praiseworthy way sought:

"to incorporate in historicizing fashion that central element for the history of National Socialism and of the "Third Reich" of the annihilatory capacity of the ideology and of the regime, and to comprehend this totalitarian reality in the interrelated context of Russian and German history". (Note: Original remarks appeared in Historische Zeitschrift, Volume 242, 1986, p. 465)

=== Entsorgung der deutschen Vergangenheit? (1988) ===
Hans-Ulrich Wehler was so enraged by Nolte's views that he wrote a book Entsorgung der deutschen Vergangenheit?: ein polemischer Essay zum "Historikerstreit" (Exoneration of the German Past?: A Polemical Essay about the "Historikerstreit") in 1988, a lengthy polemic attacking every aspect of Nolte's views. Wehler described the Historikerstreit as a "political struggle" for the historical understanding of the German past between "a cartel devoted to repressing and excusing" the memory of the Nazi years, of which Nolte was the chief member, against "the representatives of a liberal-democratic politics, of an enlightened, self-critical position, of a rationality which is critical of ideology". In another essay, Wehler declared:

"Hitler supposedly believed in the reality of this danger [of the Soviet Union threatening Germany]. Moreover, his dread of being overwhelmed by the "Asiatic" Bolsheviks was allegedly the prime motivating force behind his policies and personality. Nolte restated his axiom-one which perhaps reflects the naiveté of an historian who has devoted his life's work to the power of ideologies-in a blunter, more pointed form than ever before in the fall of 1987: "To view Hitler as a German politician rather the anti-Lenin", he reproved hundreds of knowledgeable historians, "strikes me as a proof of a regrettable myopia and narrowness". Starting from his premise, and falling under the sway of the very fears and phobias he himself has played up, Nolte once again defiantly insisted: "If Hitler was a person fundamentally driven by fears-by among others a fear of the "rat cage"-and if this renders "his motivations more understandable", then the war against the Soviet Union was not only "the greatest war ever of destruction and enslavement", but also "in spite of this, objectively speaking [!], a preemptive war".

While Nolte may like to describe his motive as the purely scientific interest of (as he likes to put it) a solitary thinker in search of a supposedly more complex, more accurate understanding of the years between 1917 and 1945, a number of political implications are clearly present. The basic tendency of Nolte's reinterpretation is to unburden German history by relativizing the Holocaust. Nolte claims the Nazi mass murder was modeled on and instigated by the excesses of the Russian Revolution, the Stalinist regime and the Gulag; that it countered this "Asiatic" danger by imitating and surpassing it. This new localization of "absolute evil" in Nolte's political theology leads away from Hitler, National Socialism and German history. It shifts the real origins of fascist barbarism onto the Marxist postulate-and the Bolshevik practice-of extermination. Once again the classic mechanism of locating the source of evil outside one's own history is at work. The German war of destruction certainly remains inhuman. But because its roots supposedly lie in the Marxist theory and Bolshevik class warfare, the German perpetrator is now seen to be reacting in defensive, understandable panic to the "original" inhumanity of the East. From there, it is only one more step to the astounding conclusion that Hitler's invasion of the Soviet Union in June 1941 and the war of conquest and extermination that followed were "objectively speaking"-one can hardly believe one's eyes-"a preemptive war".

=== Der europäische Bürgerkrieg (1987) ===
Another area of controversy was Nolte's 1987 book Der europäische Bürgerkrieg 1917–1945 and some accompanying statements, in which Nolte appeared to flirt with Holocaust denial as a serious historical argument. In a letter to Otto Dov Kulka of 8 December 1986 Nolte criticized the work of French Holocaust denier Robert Faurisson on the ground that the Holocaust did in fact occur, but went on to argue that Faurisson's work was motivated by admirable motives, in the form of sympathy for Palestinians and opposition to Israel. In Der europäische Bürgerkrieg, Nolte claimed that the intentions of Holocaust deniers are "often honorable", and that some of their claims are "not obviously without foundation". Kershaw has argued that Nolte was operating on the borderlines of Holocaust denial with his implied claim that the "negative myth" of Nazi Germany was created by Jewish historians, his allegations of the domination of Holocaust scholarship by Jewish historians, and his statements that one should withhold judgment on Holocaust deniers, whom Nolte insists are not exclusively Germans or fascists. In Kershaw's opinion, Nolte is attempting to imply that perhaps Holocaust deniers are on to something.

In Der europäische Bürgerkrieg, Nolte made five different arguments as a way of criticizing the uniqueness of the Shoah thesis. There were:

- There were other equally horrible acts of violence in the 20th century. Some of the examples Nolte cited were the Armenian genocide, Soviet deportation of the so-called "traitor nations" like the Crimean Tatars and the Volga Germans, Allied "area bombing" in World War II, and American war crimes in the Vietnam War.
- Nazi genocide was only a copy of Soviet genocide, and thus can in no way can be considered unique. In support of this, Nolte claimed that Lenin had "exterminated" the Russian intelligentsia, and used Hitler's remark at press conference of November 10, 1938 where he commented he might have to "exterminate" the German intelligentsia as an example how he feels that Hitler had merely copied Lenin.
- Nolte argued that the vast majority of Germans had no knowledge of the Shoah while it was going on Nolte claimed that the genocide of the Jews was Hitler's personal pet project, and the Holocaust was the work of only a few Germans entirely unrepresentative of German society Against the American historian Raul Hilberg, who claimed that hundreds of thousands of Germans were complicit in the Shoah from high-ranking bureaucrats to railway clerks and locomotive conductors, Nolte argued that the functional division of labour in a modern society meant that most people in Germany had no idea of how they were assisting in genocide. In support of this, Nolte cited the voluminous memoirs of German generals and Nazi leaders like Albert Speer who claimed to have no idea that their country was engaging in genocide during World War II.
- Nolte maintained that to a certain degree, Nazi anti-Semitic policies were justified responses to Jewish actions against Germany such as Weizmann's alleged 1939 "declaration of war" on Germany.
- Finally, Nolte hinted that perhaps the Holocaust never happened at all. Nolte claimed that the Wannsee Conference never happened, and argues that most Holocaust scholarship is flawed because most Holocaust historians are Jewish, and thus "biased" against Germany and in favour of the idea that there was a Holocaust.

In Der europäische Bürgerkrieg, Nolte wrote that in 1939 Germany was a "liberal" country compared with the Soviet Union. Nolte argued that most German citizens provided that there were "Aryans" and were not politically active had little to fear from the Gestapo whereas in the Soviet Union at the same time millions were being arrested, tortured and executed by the NKVD. Likewise, Nolte argued that the death rate in the German concentration camps was lower those in the Soviet Gulag camps, and used Hitler's long-running dispute with the German judiciary over the "correct" sentences to hand down as an example of how 1939 Germany was a "normal" country compared to the Soviet Union since Stalin did not have the same trouble with his judges over the "correct" sentences to hand out. The British historian Richard J. Evans wrote that Nolte was taking Hitler's dispute with the judiciary out of context, and that differences between German judges and Hitler were of a degree, not of kind.

Another controversial statement by Nolte in Der europäische Bürgerkrieg was his comment that the Kristallnacht pogrom was not that bad as pogroms in Imperial Russia killed far more Jews than those killed in Kristallnacht, and that further more people were in being killed in the Soviet Union during the Great Terror at the same time than were killed in the Kristallnacht. Likewise, Nolte argued that Nazi anti-Semitic laws had hardly affected Jewish participation in the German economy. In this respect, Nolte favourably cited the remarks by Sir Horace Rumbold, the British Ambassador to Germany 1928–33 who claimed that the "ostentatious kind of lifestyle of Jewish bankers and monied people inevitably aroused envy, as unemployment spread generally" and who spoke of "the sins of the Russian and Galician Jews" who came to Germany after 1918. The British historian Richard J. Evans accused Nolte of engaging in "comparative trivialization" with his statements about Kristallnacht and through admitting that Nolte was correct about the higher death toll in Russian pogroms and the Great Terror argued that was irrelevant to the horrors of Kristallnacht. Evans went on to write that Nolte appeared to be ignorant of the effects of various anti-Semitic laws in 1930s Germany which forbid Jews from engaging in professions like the law, medicine, the civil service while the "Aryanization" campaign saw mass expropriations of Jewish businesses.

A further controversial claim was Nolte's statement that violence in the defence of the social order is always preferable to violence aiming at the destruction of the social order. Thus, Nolte argued that the notorious lenience of judges in the Weimar Republic towards perpetrators of violence from the right while imposing stiff sentences on perpetrators of violence from the left was justified. In this way, Nolte maintained that the very harsh sentences given to the leaders of the Rote Ocktober (Red October) putsch attempt in Hamburg of October 1923 were justified while the light sentences that Hitler and the other Nazi leaders received for the Munich Beer Hall Putsch of November 1923 were also completely warranted because Nolte claimed that the Nazis were only attempting to overthrow the Weimar Republic in order to save the social order. Nolte claimed that the German Communists were seeking the "social destruction of the bourgeoisie" in the interests of the Soviet Union, which "physically exterminated these classes" while the Nazis sought only the destruction of the "Versailles system".

In 1988, the German historian Eckhard Jesse called Der europäische Bürgerkrieg a "great and bold work" that "the time is not yet ripe" for. Jesse claimed that it would take decades for historians to fully appreciate Nolte's achievement with Der europäische Bürgerkrieg. The British historian Richard J. Evans called Jesse's remarks the most inane remark anyone made during the entire Historikerstreit.

Nolte's critic, the British historian Richard J. Evans accused Nolte of taking too seriously the work of Holocaust deniers, whom Evans called cranks, not historians. Likewise, Evans charged that Nolte was guilty of making assertions not supported by the evidence as claiming that the SS massacres of Russian Jews was a form of counterinsurgency or taking at face value the self-justifying claims of German generals who professed to be ignorant of the Shoah. Evans wrote that it was not enough for Nolte to cite the claim of a functional division of labour in modern society as a way of rebutting Hilburg, instead arguing that as a historian Nolte should have found evidence that most people in Germany did not know of the "Final Solution" rather than just quoting a sociological theory. Evans wrote that most of Nolte's claims were either Der europäische Bürgerkrieg rested either on speculation and/or were based on a slight base of evidence often taken wildly out of context. Moreover, Evans claimed that the bibliography of Der europäische Bürgerkrieg suggested that Nolte was not aware of much of the vast secondary sources on German and Soviet history.

Perhaps the most extreme response to Nolte's thesis occurred on 9 February 1988, when his car was burned by leftist extremists in Berlin. Nolte called the case of arson "terrorism", and maintained that the attack was inspired by his opponents in the Historikerstreit.

== Views from outside Germany ==
=== Contemporaneous views ===
Criticism from abroad came from Ian Kershaw, Gordon A. Craig, Richard J. Evans, Saul Friedländer, John Lukacs, Michael Marrus, and Timothy Mason. Mason wrote against Nolte in a call for the sort of theories of generic fascism that Nolte himself had once championed:

"If we can do without much of the original contents of the concept of 'fascism', we cannot do without comparison. "Historicization" may easily become a recipe for provincialism. And the moral absolutes of Habermas, however politically and didactically impeccable, also carry a shadow of provincialism, as long as they fail to recognize that fascism was a continental phenomenon and that Nazism was a peculiar part of something much larger. Pol Pot, the rat torture and the fate of the Armenians are all extraneous to any serious discussion of Nazism; Mussolini's Italy is not."

Anson Rabinbach accused Nolte of attempting to erase German guilt for the Holocaust. Ian Kershaw wrote that Nolte was claiming that the Jews had essentially brought the Holocaust down on themselves, and were the authors of their own misfortunes in the Shoah. Elie Wiesel called Nolte, together with Klaus Hildebrand, Andreas Hillgruber, and Michael Stürmer, one of the "four bandits" of German historiography. American historian Jerry Muller called Nolte an anti-Semitic for suggesting that the only reason people kept the memory of the Nazi past alive was to place those descended from the victims of National Socialism in a "privileged" position. Muller accused Nolte of writing "pseudo-history" in Der Europäische Bürgerkrieg. Deborah Lipstadt argued in her 1993 book Denying the Holocaust that there was no comparison between the Khmer Rouge genocide and the Holocaust because the former had emerged as part of the aftermath of a war that destroyed Cambodia whereas the latter was part of a systematic attempt at genocide committed only because of ideological beliefs. The American historian Charles S. Maier rejected Nolte's claims regarding the moral equivalence of the Holocaust and Soviet terror on the grounds that while the latter was extremely brutal, it did not seek the physical annihilation of an entire people as a state policy. The American historian Donald McKale blasted Nolte together with Andreas Hillgruber for their statements that the Allied strategic bombing offensives were just as much acts of genocide as was the Holocaust, writing that that was just the sort of nonsense one would expect from Nazi apologists like Nolte and Hillgruber.

In response to Nolte's article "Between Myth and Revisionism", Israeli historian Otto Dov Kulka in a letter to Nolte on November 24, 1985, criticized Nolte for abandoning the view that he expressed in The Three Faces of Fascism that the Holocaust was a "singular" event, and asked "Which of the two Ernst Noltes should we regard as the authentic one?" In his reply, Nolte told Kulka to read his up-coming book Der europäische Bürgerkrieg to better understand his "shift of emphasis". In a reply of May 16, 1986, Kulka accused Nolte of engaging in a "shift of responsibility" with the Holocaust as a "preventive measure" forced on the Germans by the "Jewish provocation" of Weizmann's letter to Chamberlain. In a letter to Nolte on July 18, 1986, Kulka wrote in defense of the "singularity" of the Holocaust that: "The uniqueness of the National Socialist mass murder of the Jews must be understood in the world-historical sense attributed to it-as an attempt to bring about a change in the course of universal history and its goals. Thus, National Socialist anti-Semitism must be regarded as an expression of perhaps the most dangerous crisis of Western civilization with the potentially gravest consequences for the history of mankind..." In a letter to Kulka on October 22, 1986, Nolte wrote: "If I pursed my thinking from 1963 on, it was in a way along the line that an overexaggerated right can be equally an evil, and that an overexaggerated (historical) evil can again, in some way, be right" (emphasis in the original). Kulka accused Nolte of advancing "monocausal, retrospective explanations of universal history" and of engaging in "totalitarian thinking".

The Anglo-German historian H.W. Koch accepted Nolte's argument that Weizmann's letter to Chamberlain was indeed a "Jewish declaration of war", with the oblivious implication since all Jews were now enemies of the Reich, the Germans were entitled to treat the Jews whatever way they wanted to. From abroad came support from Norberto Ceresole and Alfred-Maurice de Zayas.

In a 1987 essay, the Austrian-born Israeli historian Walter Grab accused Nolte of engaging in an "apologia" for Nazi Germany. Grab called Nolte's claim that Weizmann's letter to Chamberlain was a "Jewish declaration of war" that justified the Germans "interning" European Jews a "monstrous theses" that was not supported by the facts. Grab accused Nolte of ignoring the economic impoverishment and the total lack of civil rights that the Jewish community in Germany lived under in 1939. Grab wrote that Nolte "mocks" the Jewish victims of National Socialism with his "absolutely infamous" statement that it was Weizmann's with his letter that caused all of the Jewish death and suffering during the Holocaust.

One of Nolte's letters created another controversy in late 1987, when Otto Dov Kulka complained that a letter he wrote to Nolte criticizing his views was edited by Nolte to make him appear rather sympathetic to Nolte's arguments, and then released to the press. In 1987, Nolte wrote an entire book responding to his critics both German and foreign, Das Vergehen der Vergangenheit: Antwort an meine Kritiker im sogenannten Historikerstreit (The Offense Of The Past: Answer At My Critics In The So-Called Historians' Dispute), which again attracted controversy because Nolte reprinted the edited version of Kulka's letters, despite the latter's objections to their inclusion in the book in their truncated form. In Das Vergehen der Vergangenheit, Nolte declared that the Historikerstreit should have begun 25 years earlier because "everything which has provoked such excitement in the course of this dispute had already been spelled out in those books [Nolte's earlier work]" and that "the simple scheme 'perpetrators-victims' reduces the complexities of history too much" (emphasis in the original). In Das Vergehen der Vergangenheit, Nolte appeared to backtrack from some of his theories, writing that after Weizmann's letter, European Jews should be treated as "civil internees" rather as "prisoners of war". Evans wrote that the sole purpose of Das Vergehen der Vergangenheit appeared to be to obscure the issues by making confusing statements about what he actually said and wrote, and that Nolte's real purpose to justify the Shoah as there is not other reason why Nolte should have been making these arguments. When an anthology was published about the Historikerstreit, Nolte objected to the subtitle "The Documentation of the Controversy Concerning the Singularity of the National Socialist Annihilation of the Jews", and instead demanded that the subtitle be "Documentation of the Controversy Surrounding the Preconditions and the Character of the "Final Solution of the Jewish Question". Only when it became clear that the book could not be published, did Nolte yield on his demands.

The Historikerstreit attracted much media attention in West Germany, where historians enjoy a higher public profile than is the case in the English-speaking world, and as a result, both Nolte and his opponents became frequent guests on West German radio and television. The Historikerstreit was characterized by a highly vitriolic tone, with both Nolte and his supporters and their opponents often resorting to vicious personal attacks on each other. In particular, the Historikerstreit marked the first occasion since the "Fischer Controversy" of the early 1960s when German historians refused to shake hands with each other. Abroad, the Historikerstreit garnered Nolte some fame, to a somewhat lesser extent. Outside of Austria, foreign press coverage tended to be hostile towards Nolte, with the fiercest criticism coming from Israel. In 1988, an entire edition of Yad Vashem Studies, the journal of the Yad Vashem Institute in Jerusalem, was devoted to the Historikerstreit. A year earlier, in 1987, concerns about some of the claims being made by both sides in the Historikerstreit led to a conference being called in London that was attended by some of the leading British, American, Israeli, and German specialists in both Soviet and German history. Among those who attended included Sir Ralf Dahrendorf, Sir Isaiah Berlin, Lord Weidenfeld, Harold James, Carol Gluck, Lord Annan, Fritz Stern, Gordon A. Craig, Robert Conquest, Samuel Ettinger, Jürgen Kocka, Sir Nicholas Henderson, Eberhard Jäckel, Hans Mommsen, Michael Stürmer, Joachim Fest, Hagen Schulze, Christian Maier, Wolfgang Mommsen, Hugh Trevor-Roper, Saul Friedländer, Felix Gilbert, Norman Stone, Julius Schoeps, and Charles S. Maier. Nolte was invited to the conference, but declined, citing scheduling conflicts. The Israeli historian Samuel Ettinger described Nolte as someone who wrote about Soviet history despite not being a Soviet specialist. Ettinger went to say about Nolte:

"Quotations from Latsis, who was First Cheka Chief; Tucholsky, the satirist and journalist, and Theodore Kaufmann (who knows who Theodore Kaufmann was?) were used as historical sources. Can an assorted collection of this kind serve as a basis for serious scholarly analysis, the starting point for the claim that poor Hitler was so frightened by the "Asiatic deeds" of the Bolsheviks that he started to exterminate Jewish children? All this without taking into account the historical development of the relationship between Germany and the Soviet Union, the military co-operation during the twenties which as well known to the German General Staff and to Hitler, Tukhachevsky's speech in 1935 was applauded at a meeting of the General Staff of Germany for its anti-Western remarks. Then there are the negotiations between Stalin and Hitler from '36 and '37 onwards which brought a rapprochement and led to the dismissal of Jewish diplomats and other public officials until the division of Poland in 1939".

The Anglo-American historian of Stalin's terror, Robert Conquest was quoted as saying about Nolte's theories:

"I think we all accept the proposition that Nazi crimes were unique and uniquely horrible, that they were a reaction against the Communist terrors seems untenable. It is conceivable that support for the National Socialists may largely have come as a reaction to Lenin's international civil war launched in 1918, but the actual crimes of the Holocaust are of a totally different nature from Stalin's crimes and I see no connection whatever. But although there is no causative connection, comparisons can still be made".

Lord Annan was quoted as saying "Nolte's article may have been sinister, even malevolent, but we have had a great example of an informed debate, of great heart-searching and of a profound examination of the nature of Germany's past and present"". The German historian Julius Schoeps stated:

"I would like stress a seminal factor in the Historikerstreit: The historians who caused this dispute are men in their sixties, that is, men who were old enough to be in the Hitler Youth, Hitlerjugend; men who were perhaps soldiers in the war; men for whom the collapse of the Third Reich turned into a trauma which is inextricably linked to the key terms Holocaust and Auschwitz. Nolte's reaction is, I think, typical of this generation of scholars. Contrary to some historians who assert that Germans should not ask such questions at all, I believe that Germans must ask them. But there is no need for slanted questions and ambiguous statements which whitewash German history. Unfortunately, questions of this kind were posed in the Historikerstreit; such assertions were made. If historians are suggesting today that Hitler had the right to intern the Jews, they may be tempted to suggest tomorrow that he had the right to kill the Jews. That is why it is crucial to discuss such moral, political, ethical lies".

During the course of the debate, Eberhard Jäckel and Joachim Fest again clashed over the question of the "singularity" of the Holocaust with Fest accusing Jäckel of presenting a "caricature" of his opponents. Writing in 1989, the British historian Richard J. Evans declared that:

"Finally, Nolte's attempts to establish the comparability of Auschwitz rest in part upon an extension of the concept of "genocide" to actions which cannot plausibly justify being described in this way. However much one might wish to criticize the Allied strategic-bombing offensive against German cities, it cannot be termed genocidal because there was no intention to exterminate the entire German people. Dresden was bombed after Coventry, not the other way around, and it is implausible to suggest that the latter was a response to the former; on the contrary, there was indeed an element of retaliation and revenge in the strategic bombing offensive, which is precisely one of the grounds on which it has often been criticized. There is no evidence to support Nolte's speculation that the ethnic Germans in Poland would have been entirely exterminated had the Nazis not completed their invasion quickly. Neither the Poles nor the Russians had any intention of exterminating the German people as a whole. At this point, it is useful to recall the conclusion of the German historian and Hitler specialist Eberhard Jäckel that "the Nazi murder of the Jews was unique because never before had a state decided and announced, on the authority of its responsible leader, that it intended to kill in its entirety, as far as possible, a particular group of human beings, including its old people, women, children and infants, and then put this decision into action with every possible instrument of power available to the state".

The attempts undertaken by Nolte, Hillgruber, Fest and other neoconservative historians to get around this fact are all ultimately unconvincing. It requires a considerable degree of myopia to regard the policies of the USA in Vietnam in the 1960s and early 1970s or the occupation of Afghanistan by the USSR in the 1980s as "genocide". However much one may deplore the conduct of the occupying armies, there is no evidence of any deliberate policy of exterminating the inhabitants of the countries in question. The terrible massacres of the Armenians by the Turks in 1915 were more deliberate, on a wider scale and concentrated into a far shorter time, then the destruction of human life in Vietnam and Afghanistan, and they were not carried out as part of a military campaign, although they did occur in wartime. But these atrocities were committed as part of a brutal policy of expulsion and resettlement; they did not constitute an attempt to exterminate a whole people. Similar things may be said of the forcible removal of Greeks from Asia Minor during the 1920s, although this has not, in contrast to the events of 1915, generally been regarded as genocide.

The Pol Pot regime in Cambodia witnessed the horrific spectacle of a nation's rulers turning upon their own people, in a manner comparable to that of the Ugandan dictator Idi Amin a few years previously. The victims, whose numbers exceeded a million, were killed, not on racial grounds, but as part of a deliberate policy of terror to subdue opposition and revenge against those thought to have collaborated with the American enemy during the previous hostilities. Moreover, the barbarities inflicted on the Cambodian people by the Pol Pot regime were to a considerable extent the result of a brutalizing process that had accompanied a terrible war, during which vast quantities of bombs were dropped on the country, destroying a large part of the moral and physical basis of Cambodian society in the process. This in no way excuses the murderous policies of the Khmer Rouge. But it does show up, once more, the contrast with the Nazi genocide of the Jews, which, as we have seen, was a gratuitous act carried out by a prosperous, advanced industrial nation at the height of its power."

Evans criticized Nolte for crediting the remark about the Armenian genocide as an "Asiatic deed" to Scheubner-Richter, when in fact, it came from a 1938 biography of Scheubner-Richter. Moreover, Evans maintained that there is no evidence to support Nolte's claim that because Max Scheubner-Richter was opposed to the Armenian genocide, that proved that Hitler thought the same way in 1915. Citing Mein Kampf, Evans argued that Hitler was an anti-Semitic long before 1914 and that it was the moderate left SPD, not the Bolsheviks that Hitler regarded as his main enemies.

Nolte's opponents have expressed intense disagreement with his evidence for a Jewish "war" on Germany. They argue that Weizmann's letter to Chamberlain was written in his capacity as head of the World Zionist Organization, not on behalf of the entire Jewish people of the world, and that Nolte's views are based on the spurious idea that all Jews comprised a distinct "nationality" who take their marching orders from Jewish organizations. Lipstadt criticized Nolte's thesis on the grounds that first, Weizmann had no army in 1939 to wage "war" against Germany with, and that Nolte had totally ignored the previous six years of Nazi persecution of the Jews, making it sound like as if Weizmann had struck a low blow against Germany for no apparent reason in 1939. Furthermore, it has been contended that there is no evidence that Hitler ever heard of Weizmann's letter to Chamberlain, and that it was natural for Weizmann, a British Jew, to declare his support for his country against a fiercely anti-Semitic regime.

As for Kaufman's book, the Nazis were certainly aware of it; during the war, Germany Must Perish! was translated into German and widely promoted as an example of what Jews thought about Germans. But most historians contended that the radical views of one American Jew can in no way be taken as typical of what all European Jews were thinking, and to put the call for the forced sterilization of Germans that was never carried out as Allied policy in the same league as the Holocaust shows a profound moral insensitivity. Moreover, it has been shown that there is no indication that Kaufman's book ever played any role in the decision-making process that led to the Holocaust. Finally, it has been contended that Nolte's comparison of the Holocaust with the internment of Japanese Americans is false, because the Jews of Europe were sent to death camps rather than internment camps, and the U.S. government did not attempt to exterminate the Japanese Americans in the internment camps.

=== Later views ===
The British historian Norman Davies argued in 2006 that revelations made after the Revolutions of 1989 resulting in the fall of Communism in Eastern Europe after 1989–91 about Soviet crimes had discredited the left-wing position taken in the 1980s during the Historikerstreit debate.

== See also ==
- Catechism debate
- History wars
- New Historians
- Secondary antisemitism
- Vergangenheitsbewältigung
- Victim theory

== Bibliography ==
- Aly, Götz. 2006. The logic of horror, June 12, 2006 German original in Die Zeit on June 1, 2006.
- Baldwin, Peter. 1990. Hitler, the Holocaust and the Historians Dispute. Boston, MA: Beacon Press.
- Caplan, Jane (2008). Nazi Germany. Oxford: Oxford University Press. ISBN 978-0-19-164774-1.
- Cohen, Roger (21 June 2000). "Hitler Apologist Wins German Honor, and a Storm Breaks Out". New York Times.
- Craig, Gordon. 1987. The War of the German Historians. New York Review of Books, February 15, 1987, 16–19.
- Eley, Geoff. 1988. Nazism, Politics and the Image of the Past: Thoughts on the West German Historikerstreit 1986–1987. Past and Present, 1988 November, 121: 171–208.
- Evans, Richard John (1989). In Hitler's Shadow: West German Historians and the Attempt to Escape from the Nazi Past. New York City: Pantheon Books. ISBN 978-0-394-57686-2. LCCN 88043239. OCLC 18740694. OL 2061583M. Wikidata Q140468023.
- Habermas, Jürgen (18 July 1986). "Eine Art Schadensabwicklung: Die apologetischen Tendenzen in der deutschen Zeitgeschichtsschreibung" [A Kind of Canceling Out of Damages: the Apologistic Tendencies in German Writing on Postwar History]. Die Zeit (in German).
- Habermas, Jürgen (1987). Eine Art Schadensabwicklung: kleine politische Schriften VI (in German). Frankfurt: Suhrkamp Verlag. ISBN 3518114530. OCLC 1357633142. OL 20927821M.
- Hillgruber, Andreas (1986). Zweierlei Untergang: Die Zerschlagung des Deutschen Reichs und das Ende des europäischen Judentums (in German). Berlin: Siedler.
- Hirschfeld, Gerhard. 1987. Erasing the Past? History Today, 1987 August, 37(8): 8–10.
- New German Critique. Special Issue on the Historikerstreit. 1988 Spring - Summer, v. 44.
- Jarausch, Konrad H. (1988). "Removing the Nazi stain? The quarrel of the historians". German Studies Review. 11 (2): 285–301. doi:10.2307/1429974. JSTOR 1429974.
- Kattago, Siobhan (2001). Ambiguous Memory: The Nazi Past and German National Identity. Westport: Praeger.
- Kershaw, Ian (1989). The Nazi Dictatorship: Problems and Perspectives of Interpretations (2nd ed.). London: Arnold.
- Kershaw, Ian (2001). Hitler: A Profile in Power (2nd ed.). London: Longman. ISBN 0-582-47280-6.
- Kühnl, Reinhard (editor). 1987. Vergangenheit, die nicht vergeht: Die "Historikerdebatte": Darstellung, Dokumentation, Kritik. Cologne: Pahl-Rugenstein.
- Lukacs, John (1991). "Reworking the Past by Peter Baldwin, ed". History: Reviews of New Books. 19 (14): 174. doi:10.1080/03612759.1991.9949377.
- Maier, Charles. 1988. The Unmasterable Past: History, Holocaust and German National Identity, Cambridge, MA: Harvard University Press.
- Muller, Jerry. 1989. German Historians at War. Commentary, 1989 May, 87(5): 33–42.
- Nolte, Ernst (1985). "Between Myth and Revisionism? The Third Reich in the Perspective of the 1980s". In Koch, H. W. (ed.). Aspects of the Third Reich. London: Palgrave Macmillan. pp. 17–38. doi:10.1007/978-1-349-17891-9_1. ISBN 978-1-349-17891-9.
- Nolte, Ernst (6 June 1986). "Die Vergangenheit, die nicht vergehen will". Frankfurter Allgemeine Zeitung (in German).
- Nolte, Ernst. 1987. Das Vergehen der Vergangenheit: Antwort an meine Kritiker im sogenannten Historikerstreit, Berlin: Ullstein.
- Peter, Jürgen. 1995. Historikerstreit und die Suche nach einer nationalen Identität der achtziger Jahre, European University Studies, Political Science Vol. 288, Frankfurt am Main, New York: Peter Lang
- Pakier, Małgorzata; Stråth, Bo (2010). A European Memory?: Contested Histories and Politics of Remembrance. Berghahn Books.
- Piper, Ernst, ed. (1993). Forever in the Shadow of Hitler?: Original Documents of the Historikerstreit, the Controversy Concerning the Singularity of the Holocaust. Translated by Knowlton, James; Truett Cates, G. Atlantic Highlands: Humanities Press. ISBN 0-391-03811-7. LCCN 92023763. OCLC 185745606. OL 1720524M. Wikidata Q140500166.
  - Stürmer, Michael (1993a). "History in a Land without History". In Piper (1993), pp. 16–17.
  - Winkler, Heinrich August (1993). "Eternally in the Shadow of Hitler? The Dispute about the Germans' Understanding of History". In Piper (1993), pp. 171–176.
  - Hildebrand, Klaus (1993). "He Who Wants to Escape the Abyss Will Have to Sound It Very Precisely: Is the New German History Writing Revisionist?". In Piper (1993), pp. 188–195.
- Stern, Fritz (2006). Five Germanys I Have Known. New York: Farrar, Straus & Giroux.
- Alfred Sohn-Rethel. 1978. Economy and Class Structure of German Fascism, London, CSE Books.
- Taylor, A. J. P. (1954). The Struggle for Mastery in Europe 1848–1918. Oxford: Oxford University Press. Wikidata Q141715908.
- Taylor, A. J. P. (1980). The Struggle for Mastery in Europe 1848–1918. Oxford University Press.
- Taylor, A. J. P. (1997). The Origins of the Second World War. Longman.
- Thomas (n.d.). n.t.
- Wehler, Hans-Ulrich (1988). Entsorgung der deutschen Vergangenheit? Ein polemischer Essay zum 'Historikerstreit' (in German). Munich: C.H. Beck.
- Wicke, Christian (2015). Helmut Kohl's Quest for Normality: His Presentation of the German Nation and Himself. New York: Berghahn.
