= Sonderweg =

Theory in German historiography

Sonderweg (German: [ˈzɔndɐˌveːk], 'special path') refers to the theory in German historiography that considers the German-speaking lands or the country of Germany itself to have followed a unique course from aristocracy to democracy unlike any other in Europe.

The modern school of thought by that name arose early during World War II as a consequence of the rise of Nazi Germany. In consequence of the scale of the devastation wrought on Europe by Nazism, the Sonderweg theory of German history has progressively gained a following inside and outside Germany, especially since the late 1960s. In particular, its proponents argue that the way Germany developed over the centuries virtually ensured the evolution of a social and political order along the lines of Nazi Germany. In their view, German mentalities, the structure of society, and institutional developments followed a different course in comparison with the other nations of the West. The German historian Heinrich August Winkler wrote about the question of there being a Sonderweg:

For a long time, educated Germans answered it in the positive, initially by laying claim to a special German mission, then, after the collapse of 1945, by criticizing Germany's deviation from the West. Today, the negative view is predominant. Germany did not, according to the now prevailing opinion, differ from the great European nations to an extent that would justify speaking of a 'unique German path'. And, in any case, no country on earth ever took what can be described as the 'normal path'.

== 19th century ==
The term Sonderweg was first used by German conservatives in the imperial period, starting in the late 19th century as a source of pride at the "Golden Mean" of governance that in their view had been attained by the German state, whose distinctiveness as an authoritarian state lay in taking the initiative in instituting social reforms and in imposing them without waiting to be pressured by demands "from below". That type of authoritarianism was seen to be avoiding both the autocracy of Imperial Russia and what they regarded as the weak, decadent and ineffective democratic governments of Britain and France. The idea of Germany as a great Central European power, neither of the West nor of the East, was to be a recurring feature of right-wing German thought right up to 1945.

The historian Hans-Ulrich Wehler of the Bielefeld School places the origins of Germany's path to disaster in the 1860s and the 1870s, when economic modernization took place, but political modernization did not happen, and the old Prussian rural elite remained in firm control of the army, diplomacy and the civil service. Traditional, aristocratic and premodern society battled an emerging capitalist, bourgeois and modernizing society. Recognizing the importance of modernizing forces in industry and the economy and in the cultural realm, Wehler argues that reactionary traditionalism dominated the political hierarchy of power in Germany, as well as social mentalities and in class relations (Klassenhabitus).

== 20th century ==
=== During World War II ===
Nazi Germany's occupation of Czechoslovakia in March 1939 and its invasion of Poland in September 1939 (the latter invasion immediately drawing France and Britain into World War II) provoked the drive to explain the phenomenon of Nazi Germany. In 1940, Sebastian Haffner, a German émigré living in Britain, published Germany: Jekyll and Hyde, in which he argued it was Adolf Hitler alone, by the force of his peculiar personality, who had brought about Nazi Germany. In 1941, the British diplomat Robert Vansittart published The Black Record: Germans Past And Present, according to which Nazism was only the latest manifestation of what Vansittart argued were the exclusively German traits of aggressiveness and brutality. Other books with a thesis similar to Vansittart's were Rohan Butler's The Roots of National Socialism (1941) and William Montgomery McGovern's From Luther to Hitler: The History of Nazi-Fascist Philosophy (1946).

=== Early postwar period ===
After Germany's defeat in World War II in 1945, the term Sonderweg lost its positive connotations from the 19th century and acquired its present negative meaning. There was much debate about the origins of this "German catastrophe" (as the German historian Meinecke titled his 1946 book) of Nazi Germany's rise and fall. Since then, scholars have examined developments in intellectual, political, social, economic and cultural history to investigate why German democracy failed during the Weimar Republic and which factors led to the rise of Nazism. In the 1960s, many historians concluded that the failure of Germany to develop firm democratic institutions in the 19th century had been decisive for the failure of the Weimar Republic in the 20th century.

Until the mid-1960s, the Sonderweg debate was polarized with most non-German participants at one pole and German participants at the other. Historians like Léon Poliakov, A. J. P. Taylor, and Lewis Bernstein Namier, echoed by journalists like the American William L. Shirer, portrayed Nazism as the inevitable result of German history, reflecting unique flaws in "German national character" that went back to the days of Martin Luther, if not before.

During the Raleigh Lecture on History in 1944, Namier stated that the German liberals in the Revolution of 1848 were "in reality forerunners of Hitler", whose views about the Poles and Czechs presaged the great international crises of 1938–39, and called the 1848 revolution "a touchstone of German mentality and a decisive element in East-European politics" In his lecture, Namier described the 1848 revolution as "the early manifestations of aggressive nationalism, especially of German nationalism which derives from the much belauded Frankfurt Parliament rather than from Bismarck and "Prussianism". Namier concluded "had not Hitler and his associates blindly accepted the legend which latter-day liberals, German and foreign had spun around 1848, they might well have found a great deal to extol in the deutsche Männer und Freunde ['German men and friends'] of the Frankfurt Assembly".

Taylor wrote in his 1945 book The Course of German History that the Nazi regime "represented the deepest wishes of the German people", and that it was the first and only German government created by the Germans as the Holy Roman Empire had been created by France and Austria, the German Confederation by Austria and Prussia and the Weimar Republic by the Allies. In contrast, Taylor argued, "but the Third Reich rested solely on German force and impulse; it owed nothing to alien forces. It was a tyranny imposed upon the German people by themselves". Taylor argued that Nazism was inevitable because the Germans wanted "to repudiate the equality with the peoples of eastern Europe which had then been forced upon them" after 1918. Taylor wrote that:

During the preceding eighty years the Germans had sacrificed to the Reich all their liberties; they demanded as a reward the enslavement of others. No German recognized the Czechs or Poles as equals. Therefore, every German desired the achievement which only total war could give. By no other means could the Reich be held together. It had been made by conquest and for conquest; if it ever gave up its career of conquest, it would dissolve.

The American historian Peter Viereck wrote in his 1949 book Conservatism Revisited: The Revolt Against the Revolt 1815–1949:

Is it being unhistorical to judge the anti-Metternichian nationalism and racism of 19th century Germany by its Nazi consequences? Were those consequences the logical outcome or a modern accident for which nationalism should not be blamed? Is it a case of the wise-after-the-fallacy to read so much into those early rebels of 1806-1848, whom many historians still consider great liberals?...The liberal university professors, Metternich's fiercest foes and now so prominent in 1848, were often far from the cloudy idealists pictured in our textbooks. From his own viewpoint, Bismarck erred in mocking their lack of Realpolitik. The majority... was more Bismarckian than Bismarck ever realized. Many liberals... later became leading propagandists for Bismarck, along with the new National Liberal Party. Only an honorable few continued to oppose him and the militarist success-worship that followed his victorious wars.

Shirer in his 1960 book The Rise and Fall of the Third Reich argued for the view that German history proceeded logically from "Luther to Hitler" (Note: "The notion that 'rectitude and authenticity [were] integrally German attributes in contrast to Roman or Latin influences which were degrading' held to have originated with Luther developed with German Romanticism in the 19th Century and culminated with National Socialism.") and saw Hitler's rise to power as an expression of German character, rather than of the international phenomenon of totalitarianism. Shirer encapsulated that by stating that "the course of German history... made blind obedience to temporal rulers the highest virtue of Germanic man and put a premium on servility."

The French historian Edmond Vermeil wrote in his 1952 book L'Allemagne contemporaine ('Contemporary Germany') that Nazi Germany was not "a purely adventitious episode appearing on the fringes of the German tradition". Instead, Vermeil contended that German nationalism had an especially aggressive character, which had been restrained only by Bismarck. After Bismarck's departure in 1890, Vermeil wrote, "It was after his fall, under William II, that this nationalism, breaking all barriers and escaping from the grip of a weak government, gave rise to a state of mind and a general situation that we have to analyze, for otherwise Nazism with its momentary triumphs and its terrible collapse will remain incomprehensible". Vermeil concluded that Germany will remain on a separate path, "always placing the spirit of its implacable technical discipline at the service of those visions of the future that its eternal romanticism begets".

Poliakov wrote that even if not all Germans supported the Holocaust, it was "tacitly accepted by the popular will".

In contrast, German historians such as Friedrich Meinecke, Hans Rothfels, and Gerhard Ritter, joined by a few non-German historians such as Pieter Geyl, contended that the Nazi period had no relationship to earlier periods of German history and that German traditions were at sharp variance with the totalitarianism of the Nazi movement. Meinecke famously described Nazism in his 1946 book Die Deutsche Katastrophe ('The German Catastrophe') as a particularly unfortunate Betriebsunfall ('workplace accident') of history. Although opposed to what they regarded as Meinecke's excessively-defensive tone, Ritter and Rothfels have been joined by their intellectual heirs Klaus Hildebrand, Karl Dietrich Bracher and Henry Ashby Turner in contending that although the Nazi dictatorship was rooted in the German past, individual choices made during the later Weimar years led to the Nazi years. Though Bracher is opposed to the Sonderweg interpretation of German history, he does believe in a special German mentality (Sonderbewusstsein, 'special consciousness') that emerged in the late 18th century. Bracher wrote that:

The German "Sonderweg" should be limited to the era of the Third Reich, but the strength of the particular German mentality [Sonderbewusstsein] that had arisen already with its opposition to the French Revolution and grew stronger after 1870 and 1918 must be emphasized. Out of its exaggerated perspectives (and, I would add, rhetoric) it become a power in politics, out of a mythic reality. The road from democracy to dictatorship was not a particular German case, but the radical nature of the National Socialist dictatorship corresponded to the power of the German ideology that in 1933–1945 became a political and totalitarian reality [...].

In a 1983 speech, Hildebrand denied there had been a Sonderweg and claimed that the Sonderweg applied only to the "special case" of the Nazi dictatorship In a 1984 essay, Hildebrand went further and wrote:

It remains to be seen, whether future scholarship will initiate a process of historicization of the Hitler period, for example by comparing it with Stalinist Russia and with examples such as the Stone Age Communism of Cambodia. This would doubtless be accompanied by terrifying scholarly insights and painful human experiences. Both phenomena could, horribile dictu, even relativize the concept of the German Sonderweg between 1933 and 1945 [...].

In response, Heinrich August Winkler argued that there was a Sonderweg before 1933 and that Germany was a country deeply influenced by the Enlightenment, which meant there was no point of comparison between Hitler on one hand and Pol Pot and Stalin on the other.

=== Since mid-1960s ===
Starting in the 1960s, historians such as Fritz Fischer and Hans-Ulrich Wehler argued that unlike France and Britain, Germany had experienced only "partial modernization" in which industrialization was not followed by changes in the political and social spheres which in the opinion of Fischer and Wehler, continued to be dominated by a "pre-modern" aristocratic elite. In the opinion of the proponents of the Sonderweg thesis, the crucial turning point was the Revolution of 1848, when German liberals failed to seize power and consequently either emigrated or chose to resign themselves to being ruled by a reactionary elite and to live in a society that taught its children obedience, glorification of militarism and pride in a very complex notion of German culture. During the latter half of the German Empire, from about 1890 to 1918, that pride, they argued, developed into hubris. Since 1950, historians such as Fischer, Wehler and Hans Mommsen have drawn a harsh indictment of the German elite from 1870 to 1945, who were accused of promoting authoritarian values; being solely responsible for launching World War I; sabotaging the democratic Weimar Republic; and aiding and abetting the Nazi dictatorship in internal repression, war, and genocide. In the view of Wehler, Fischer and their supporters, only the German defeat in 1945 put an end to the "premodern" social structure, which had led to and then sustained traditional German authoritarianism and its more radical variant, National Socialism. Wehler has asserted that the effects of the traditional power elite in maintaining power up to 1945 "and in many respects even beyond that" took the form of:

a penchant for authoritarian politics; a hostility toward democracy in the educational and party system; the influence of preindustrial leadership groups, values and ideas; the tenacity of German state ideology; the myth of the bureaucracy; the superimposition of caste tendencies and class distinctions; and the manipulation of political antisemitism.

Another version of the Sonderweg thesis emerged in the United States in the 1950s to the 1960s, when historians such as Fritz Stern and George Mosse examined ideas and culture in 19th-century Germany, especially those of the virulently anti-Semitic Völkisch movement. Mosse and Stern both concluded that the intellectual and cultural elites in Germany by and large chose to consciously reject modernity and along with it those groups they identified with modernity, such as Jews, and embraced anti-Semitism as the basis for their Weltanschauung ('world-view'). However, in recent years, Stern has abandoned his conclusion and now argues against the Sonderweg thesis, holding the views of the Völkisch movement to be a mere "dark undercurrent" in Imperial Germany.

In 1990, Jürgen Kocka wrote about the Sonderweg's theories:

Yet, at the same time, researches looked back to the eighteenth and nineteenth centuries to uncover the deeper roots of the Third Reich. Through comparisons with England, France, the United States, or simply "the West", they attempted to identify the peculiarities of Germany history, those structures and processes, experiences, and turning points, which while they may not have led directly to National Socialism, nevertheless hindered the long term development of liberal democracy in Germany and eventually facilitated the triumph of fascism. Many authors made various contributions to the elaboration of this argument, usually without actually using the word Sonderweg.

Helmuth Plessner, for example, spoke of 'the belated nation' (die verspätete Nation), the delayed creation of a nation-state from above. Other historians have argued that nationalism played an especially aggressive, precociously right-wing destructive role during the Second Empire. Ernst Fraenkel, the young Karl Dietrich Bracher, Gerhard A. Ritter, M. Rainer Lepsius and others identified powerful long-term weaknesses in the Empire's system of government: the blocked development of parliamentarianism, the severely fragmented system of parties that resembled self-contained blocks, and other factors that later burdened Weimar and contributed to its breakdown. Leonard Krieger, Fritz Stern, George Mosse and Kurt Sontheimer emphasized the illiberal, antipluralistic elements in German political culture upon which National Socialist ideas could later build.

Hans Rosenberg and others argued that preindustrial elites, especially the east Elbian landowners (the Junker), upper-level civil servants and the officer corps retained great power and influence well into the 20th century. In the long term, they represented an obstacle to democratization and parliamentarianism. As Heinrich August Winkler has shown, their effort is visible in the pernicious role played by agrarian interests in the collapse of the Weimar Republic. The unification of Germany by means of blood and iron under Prussian hegemony expanded the political influence and social weight of the officer corps with its status-oriented claims to exclusivity and autonomy. Along with the old elites, many traditional and preindustrial norms, ways of thinking and modes of life also survived, which included the authoritarian outlook and antiproletarian claims of the petty bourgeoise as well as militaristic elements of middle-class political culture, such as the institution of the reserve officer.

The liberal Max Weber criticized the feudalization of the upper bourgeoisie, which seemed to accept both the disproportional representation of the nobility in politics and the aristocratic norms and practices, instead of striving for power on its own terms or cultivating a distinctly middle-class culture. Lacking the experience of a successful revolution from below, schooled in a long tradition of bureaucratically led reforms from above and challenged by a growing workers' movement, the German bourgeoise appeared relatively weak and – compared with the West – almost "unbourgeois."

Another variant of the Sonderweg theory has been provided by Michael Stürmer, who, echoing claims of conservative historians during the Imperial and Weimar periods, argues that it was geography that was the key to German history. Stürmer contends that what he regards as Germany's vulnerable geopolitical situation in Central Europe left successive German governments no other choice but to engage in authoritarianism. Stürmer's views have been controversial and would become one of the central issues in the notorious Historikerstreit ('historians' dispute') of the mid-1980s. One of Stürmer's leading critics, Jürgen Kocka, himself a proponent of the Sonderweg view of history, argued that "Geography is not destiny", suggesting that the reasons for the Sonderweg were political and cultural instead. Kocka wrote against Stürmer that both Switzerland and Poland are also "in the middle" but each has a completely different history.

=== Subdebate over Holocaust ===
In his 1992 book Ordinary Men, Christopher Browning opposed the theory that Germans in the Nazi era were motivated by the especially virulent antisemitism that had characterized German culture for centuries. Analyzing the troops of the special police battalion units, who were the ones who directly killed Jews in the mass raids phase of the Holocaust (prior to the death camps), Browning concluded that the typical middle-class workers were not ingrained with antisemitism but became killers through peer pressure and indoctrination.

The debate on the Sonderweg was renewed by the American scholar Daniel Goldhagen with his 1996 book, Hitler's Willing Executioners. Goldhagen countered that German society, politics and life until 1945 were characterized by a unique version of extreme antisemitism that held the murder of Jews as the highest possible national value. His critics such as Yehuda Bauer replied that Goldhagen ignored most recent research and ignored other developments both in Germany and abroad. Ruth Bettina Birn asserts that Goldhagen "allow[ed] his thesis to dictate his presentation of the evidence". Nonetheless, Goldhagen is often held to have succeeded in reviving the debate on the question of a German collective guilt, and, in Germany, of bringing many Germans to a modern confrontation with a debate about the legacy of the Holocaust.

=== Pan-European criticism ===
In recent decades, German historiography has shifted from nationalism to a pan-European viewpoint. Most recent scholars reject the old notion of separate national paths typified by models of the German Sonderweg or the French singularité française.

The leading critics of the Sonderweg thesis have been two British Marxist historians, Geoff Eley and David Blackbourn, who in their 1984 book The Peculiarities of German History (first published in German in 1980 as Mythen deutscher Geschichtsschreibung: Die gescheiterte bürgerliche Revolution von 1848, 'Myths of German Historiography: the Unsuccessful Bourgeois Revolution of 1848') argued that there is no normal course of social and political change; that the experience of France and Britain in the 19th century was not the norm for Europe; and that even if the liberal German middle class was disempowered at the national political level, it nevertheless dominated the social, economic and cultural life of 19th-century Germany. The embourgeoisement of German social life was greater than in Britain and France, which, in the opinion of Eley and Blackbourn, was more distinctly marked by aristocratic values than Germany. They rejected the entire concept of the Sonderweg as a flawed construct supported by "a curious mixture of idealistic analysis and vulgar materialism" that led to an "exaggerated linear continuity between the nineteenth century and the 1930s".

In the view of Blackbourn and Eley, there was no Sonderweg, and it is ahistorical to judge why Germany did not become Britain for the simple reason that Germany is Germany, and Britain is Britain. Moreover, Eley and Blackbourn argued that after 1890, there was a tendency towards greater democratization in German society with the growth of civil society as reflected in the growth of trade unions and a more-or-less free press. From the right, Otto Pflanze claimed that Wehler's use of such terms as Bonapartism, social imperialism, negative integration and Sammlungspolitik ('the politics of rallying together') has gone beyond mere heuristic devices and instead become a form of historical fiction.

The German conservative historian Thomas Nipperdey, in a 1975 book review of Wehler's Das Deutsche Kaiserreich, argued that Wehler presented German elites as more united than they were, focused too much on forces from above and not enough on forces from below in 19th-century German society and presented too stark a contrast between the forces of order and stabilization and the forces of democracy with no explanation for the relative stability of the Empire. In Nipperdey's opinion, Wehler's work fails to explain how the Weimar Republic occurred since, according to Wehler, prior to 1918, the forces of authoritarianism were so strong and those of democracy so weak. Nipperdey concluded his review that a proper history of the Imperial period could be written only by placing German history in a comparative European and trans-Atlantic perspective, which might allow for "our fixation on the struggle with our great-grandfathers" to end.

Many scholars have disputed Eley's and Blackbourn's conclusions such as Jürgen Kocka and Wolfgang Mommsen. Kocka in particular has argued that while the Sonderweg thesis may not explain the reasons for the rise of the Nazi movement, it still explains the failure of the democratic Weimar Republic. That seems to entail that the issue of the Sonderweg is limited to an individual development (albeit of a type frequently encountered).

Detlev Peukert in his influential 1987 work (English translation published in 1992) The Weimar Republic: The Crisis of Classical Modernity suggested Germany's experience was a crisis involving socio-political phenomena common to all modernising countries.

In the 2014 work "AntiJudaism: The Western Tradition", historian David Nirenberg argues that the conditions of Jew-hatred and replacement were also found in every other European country and had their roots in Graeco-Roman antiquity and imperial Christianity.

== German history before 1806 ==
Schubert states that the history of the Holy Roman Empire is not to be confused with the Sonderweg, which can be seen only as a result of the concept of German identity, which developed in the Romanticism of the late 18th century and was reinforced by the Napoleonic Wars in which Germany was under French occupation. Previous events, especially those of the Holy Roman Empire, cannot be related to the evolution of Nazism.

== See also ==
- Black legend
- Exceptionalism
- Functionalism–intentionalism debate
- Here Is Germany
- Historikerstreit ('historians' dispute')
- Manifest destiny
- Mitteleuropa ('Middle Europe')
- Modernization theory § Modernization and democracy
- Robert Vansittart, 1st Baron Vansittart
- Your Job in Germany
- Vergangenheitsbewältigung ('coming to terms with the past')
- German Sonderweg in affirmative Marxist perspectives:
  - The German Ideology (a work by Karl Marx and Friedrich Engels), that would later become one of the foundational texts for the Frankfurt School and was expanded upon in regards to the Sonderweg theory particularly by Theodor W. Adorno's works The Jargon of Authenticity: An Essay On German Ideology, The Meaning of Working Through the Past, and Culture und Kultur
  - Non-simultaneity, a concept by Ernst Bloch

== Sources ==
- Berman, Sherri. 2001. "Modernization in Historical Perspective: The Case of Imperial Germany." World Politics Volume 53, Number 3, April 2001, pp. 431–462 in Project MUSE
- Blackbourn, David & Eley, Geoff. 1984. The Peculiarities of German History: bourgeois society and politics in nineteenth-century Germany. Oxford: Oxford University Press. Revised and expanded translation of the authors' Mythen deutscher Geschichtsschreibung: Die gescheiterte bürgerliche Revolution von 1848, 1980.
- Browning, Christopher. 1992. Ordinary Men: Reserve Police Battalion 101 and the Final Solution in Poland. New York: HarperCollins.
- Goldhagen, Daniel J. 1996. Hitler's Willing Executioners; Ordinary Germans and the Holocaust. New York: Alfred A. Knopf.
- Grebing, Helga. 1986. Der deutsche Sonderweg in Europa 1806-1945: Eine Kritik. Stuttgart: Kohlhammer Verlag.
- Groh, Dieter. 1983. "Le Sonderweg de l'histoire allemande: Mythe ou réalité." Annales, Économies, Sociétés, Civilisations, 38:1166–87.
- Hamerow, Theodore S. 1983. "Guilt, Redemption and Writing German History." The American Historical Review, February 1983, 88:53–72.
- Heilbronner, Oded. 2000. "From Antisemitic Peripheries to Antisemitic Centres: The Place of Antisemitism in Modern German History." Journal of Contemporary History, 35(4):559–576.
- Hinde, John (1998). "Sonderweg". In Buse, Dieter; Doerr, Juergen (eds.). Modern Germany An Encyclopedia of History, People and Culture 1871–1990. Vol. 2. New York: Garland Publishing. pp. 934–935.
- Jarausch, Konrad. 1983. "Illiberalism and Beyond: German History in Search of a Paradigm." Journal of Modern History, 55:647–686.
- Kershaw, Ian (2000). The Nazi Dictatorship Problems and Perspectives of Interpretation. London: Arnold Press.
- Kocka, Jürgen. Jan 1988. "German History before Hitler: The Debate about the German 'Sonderweg.'" Journal of Contemporary History, 23(1):3–16 in JSTOR
- Moeller, Robert. 1983. "The Kaiserreich Recast?: Continuity and Change in Modern German Historiography." Journal of Social History, 1983–1984, 17:655–684.
- Mommsen, Wolfgang. 1980. "Review of Mythen deutscher Geschichtsschreibung." Bulletin of the German Historical Institute, 4:19–26.
- Peukert, Detlev. Die Weimarer Republik: Krisenjahre der Klassischen Moderne, Frankfurt am Main: Suhrkamp Verlag, 1987 translated into English as The Weimar Republic: the Crisis of Classical Modernity, New York: Hill and Wang, 1992 ISBN 0-8090-9674-9.
- Shirer, William Lawrence (1960). The Rise and Fall of the Third Reich: A History of Nazi Germany. New York City: Simon & Schuster. ASIN B0766DKDLR. LCCN 60006729. OCLC 1286630. OL 5794925M. Wikidata Q138029595.
- Smith, Helmut Walser. "When the Sonderweg Debate Left Us." German Studies Review, May 2008, 31(2):225–240
- Taylor, A.J.P. (1945). The Course of German History. Hamish Hamilton.
- Wehler, Hans-Ulrich. 1985. The German Empire, 1871–1918. Kim Traynor, translator. Leamington Spa: Berg.
- Wehler, Hans-Ulrich. 1981. "‚Deutscher Sonderweg' oder allgemeine Probleme des westlichen Kapitalismus." Merkur, 5:478–487.
