= Eckart Kehr =

German economist (1902–1933)

Eckart Kehr (21 June 1902 in Brandenburg an der Havel, Brandenburg, Germany – 29 May 1933 in Washington, DC) was a Marxist German historian who was one of the first historians to emphasize the importance of social structure and economic interests in influencing political decisions, instead of heroic personalities. A student of Friedrich Meinecke, whom he broke from, he was called the "enfant terrible" of the German historical profession during the Weimar Republic.

His most important work is his 1930 doctoral thesis (published 1931) Schlachtflottenbau und Parteipolitik 1894–1901: Versuch eines Querschnitts durch die innenpolitischen, sozialen und ideologischen Voraussetzungen des deutschen Imperialismus ("Battle Fleet Construction and Party Politics in Germany, 1894–1901: A Cross-Section of the Political, Social and Ideological Preconditions of German Imperialism"), which describes the domestic economic sources of Germany's naval policy during the years 1894 to 1901, reversing the cherished doctrine of Leopold von Ranke of the primacy of foreign policy in the life of the German state and opposing the dominant German historicism in favor of a Marxist-Weberian theory emphasizing economics and class struggle, claiming that plutocratic industrialists (bourgeoisie) and agrarian Junkers (nobles) formed power structures ("feudalization of the bourgeoisie") to influence policymakers in their fight against radical democratic forces even when it hurt Germany and caused it to become isolated. The monograph gained slow acceptance, and his arrogant tone and historical mistakes (the bourgeois-noble alliance was less solid than he claimed) held it back for decades, until West German historian Hans-Ulrich Wehler et al. revived it to create the Bielefeld School of social history in the 1960s-1970s. It is now considered a classic in the history of the Germany of Kaiser Wilhelm II.

He died in 1933, at the age of 31, of a heart attack.

== Publications ==
- Gesammelte Aufsatze zur Preussisch-Deutschen Sozialgeschichte im 19. and 20. Jahrhundert
- Englandhass und Weltpolitik
