= Michael Stürmer =

German historian (1938–2026)

- Born: 29 September 1938; Kassel, Gau Electoral Hesse, Germany
- Died: 13 July 2026 (aged 87)
- Occupation: Historian

Academic background
- Education: University of Marburg
- Thesis: Koalition und Opposition in der Weimarer Republik 1924–1928 (1965)
- Doctoral advisor: Erich Matthias

Michael Stürmer (29 September 1938 – 13 July 2026) was a German conservative historian who specialised in the history of the German Empire (1871–1918). He is best known for his role in the Historikerstreit of the 1980s, for his geographical interpretation of German history and for an admiring 2008 biography of Vladimir Putin.

== Early life and education ==
Stürmer was born in Kassel, Germany, to Bruno Stürmer, a Hitler Youth prize-winning composer who wrote and performed music for the city's Nazi events, and Ursula (née Scherbening), a violinist. His maternal grandfather was Walther Scherbening, the chief of general staff in the Imperial Schutztruppe for German South West Africa from 1905 to 1908.

He attended a Waldorf gymnasium in Kassel (graduating in 1956), followed by a technical internship. Supported by the German Academic Scholarship Foundation, he received his education in history, philosophy and languages at the University of Marburg, at the Free University of Berlin as a student of Gordon A. Craig, and at the London School of Economics, where he was influenced by the philosopher Michael Oakeshott and the military historian Michael Howard. He returned to Marburg to complete his doctoral dissertation Koalition und Opposition in der Weimarer Republik 1924–1928 under the supervision of Erich Matthias (a former Wehrmacht lieutenant and a student of Werner Conze) in 1965.

== Academic career ==
Stürmer was initially employed as a research assistant for his supervisor at the University of Mannheim (1966–1970). After a brief visiting position at the University of Sussex (1970–1971) he completed his habilitation at the Technische Universität Darmstadt under Helmut Böhme. From 1973 to 2003 he held a professorship at the University of Erlangen-Nürnberg.

He was a visiting lecturer at Harvard University (1976–1977), the Institute for Advanced Study (1977–1978), and the Sorbonne (1984–1985).

=== Public career and political involvement ===
Stürmer began on the political left in the 1960s, but shifted rightward during the course of the 1970s. The turning point occurred in 1974 when the Social Democratic Party of Germany Land government of Hesse attempted to abolish history as a subject in the Hesse educational system and to replace it with "social studies". Stürmer played a major role in campaigning for the defeat of the SPD government in the 1974 elections. Starting in the early 1980s he became a well-known figure in the Federal Republic, with frequent contributions to the Frankfurter Allgemeine Zeitung newspaper, his editorship of a number of popular book series entitled "The Germans and their Nation" and holding a series of lectures for the general public.

In the 1980s Stürmer worked as an advisor and speech-writer to the West German Chancellor Helmut Kohl. In the mid-1980s he sat on a committee – together with Thomas Nipperdey and Klaus Hildebrand – in charge of vetting the publications issued by the Research Office of the West German Ministry of Defense. The committee attracted some controversy when it refused to publish a hostile biography of Gustav Noske.

From 1987 to 1998 Stürmer was the director of the German Institute for International and Security Affairs in Ebenhausen. In 2004 he became a founding member of the Valdai Discussion Club.

As of 2013 Stürmer worked as chief correspondent for the newspaper Die Welt, published by the Axel Springer AG publishing group. As of 2025, he continued to serve on the political economy advisory board of OMFIF.

== Death ==
Stürmer died on 13 July 2026, at the age of 87.

== Work and reception ==
=== Views ===
Stürmer has argued that "the future is won by those who coin concepts and interpret the past". In a series of his essays published in book form in 1986 as Dissonanzen des Fortschritts (Dissonances of Progress), he claimed that democracy in West Germany cannot be taken for granted; that though Germany does have a democratic past, the present system of the Federal Republic developed in response to past totalitarian experiences of both left and right; that geography has played a key role in limiting the options of German governments; and that given the Cold War, the ideas of neutrality for the Federal Republic or reunification with East Germany were not realistic.

He is arguably best known for his advocacy of a geographical interpretation of German history. In a geographical variant of the Sonderweg theory, he has argued that what he regards as Germany's precarious geographical situation in Central Europe has played the deciding role in the course of German history, and that coping with this has left successive German rulers no other choice but to engage in authoritarian government. In Stürmer's opinion, the "belligerence" of the Reich came about through a complex interplay of Germany's location in the "middle of Europe" surrounded by enemies and of "democratic" forces in the domestic sphere.

Stürmer asserted that Germany – confronted with dangers from a revanchist France and an aggressive Russia, and as the "country in the middle" – could not afford the luxury of democracy. He regards Imperial Germany as more democratic and less "Bonapartist" than historians such as Hans-Ulrich Wehler have claimed, and that these democratic tendencies came to the fore during the Revolution of 1918–1919. In Stürmer's view, it was too much democracy rather than too little that led to the end of the Kaiserreich as the "restless Reich" collapsed because of its internal contradictions under the pressures of World War I.

=== Involvement in the Historikerstreit ===
During the late 1980s, Stürmer played a prominent role in the Historikerstreit. Left-wing historians criticized him for an essay he wrote entitled "Land Without History" published in the Frankfurter Allgemeine Zeitung on 25 April 1986, in which he had claimed that Germans lacked a history to be proud of, and called for a positive evaluation of German history as a way of building national pride. He argued that Germans were suffering from a "loss of orientation" caused by the lack of a positive view of their history. In his view, the fall of the Weimar Republic was caused by "loss of orientation" due to the secularization of a previously religious country.

Stürmer argued that West Germany had an important role in the world to play, could not play that role because the lack of a past to be proud of was "seriously damaging the political culture of the country" and wrote that it was "morally legitimate and politically necessary" for Germans to have a positive view of their history. In his view, what was needed was a campaign by the government, the media and historians to create a "positive view" of German history.

In Stürmer's opinion, the Nazi era was a major block towards a positive view of the German past, and what was needed was a focus on the broad sweep of German history as opposed to the 12 years of Nazi Germany as a way of creating a national identity that all Germans could take pride in. He wrote that the "loss of orientation" caused by the absence of a German national identity led to a "search for identity". In his opinion this search was crucial because West Germany was "now once more a focal point in the global civil war waged against democracy by the Soviet Union". Because of the "loss of orientation", he argued that West Germans were not standing up well to the "campaign of fear and hate carried into the Federal Republic from the East and welcomed within like a drug". He claimed that Konrad Adenauer's policy in the 1950s of not prosecuting those responsible for Nazi-era crimes against humanity and war crimes was a wise one and that it was a huge mistake to begin prosecutions in the 1970s as it destroyed any prospect of positive feelings about the German past.

Writing in 1986, Stürmer complained that recent opinion polls showed 80% of Americans were proud of being American, that 50% of the British were proud of being British, and 20% of West Germans were proud of being German, and argued until national pride could be restored, West Germany could not play an effective part in the Cold War.

At the 1986 Römerberg Colloquia (a gathering of intellectuals held annually in Frankfurt), Stürmer argued that Germans had a destructive "obsession with their guilt", which he complained led to a lack of a positive sense of German national identity. Likewise, he argued that the legacy of 1960s radicalism was an over-emphasis on the Nazi period in German history. He called for Sinnstiftung, to give German history a meaning that would allow for a positive national identity.

At the colloquia, Stürmer stated: "We cannot live by making our past...into a permanent source of endless guilt feelings". At the same gathering, he spoke of "the deadly idiocies of the victors of 1918", which led to a loss of a German national identity, and to the collapse of the Weimar Republic as Germans, confronted with the crises of modernity without a positive national identity, opted for the Nazi solution. At the same time he complained that the Allies had made the same mistake after 1945 as they had in 1918, laying a burden of guilt on Germans that prevented them from having positive feelings about their past. He complained that, "as Stalin's men sat in judgment in Nuremberg" proved, that what he regards as the self-destructive German obsession with Nazi guilt was the work of outsiders serving their own aims.

During the same session, Stürmer attacked those historians who argued that Germany started World War I in 1914, and instead blamed France and Russia for the First World War. Moreover, he argued that whatever Germany did to start the First World War was only a defensive reaction imposed by geography.

The sessions of the 1986 Römerberg Colloquia involving Stürmer were stormy. When it became time to print the proceedings of the Colloquia, he refused to allow his contributions to be published, complaining of the "defamations and denunciations" he alleged to have been subjected to. When his contribution, the essay "Weder verdrängen noch bewältigen: Geschichte und Gegenwartsbewusstein der Deutschen" was published in the Swiss journal Schweizer Monatshefte, he edited it heavily to remove many of his more controversial statements about the need for Germans to forget about Nazi crimes in order to feel good about their past. Despite his editing of his essay, he refused to allow it to be published in an anthology about the Historikerstreit out of the concern it might damage his reputation as a historian. Stürmer's critic, the British historian Richard J. Evans stated that the remarks he quoted Stürmer as making at the 1986 Römerberg Colloquia came from a tape-recorded record at the Colloquia, and not from the edited version provided by Stürmer.

Jürgen Habermas began his article "A Kind of Settlement of Damages" in the Die Zeit newspaper on 11 July 1986, with an attack on Stürmer. He took Stürmer to task for his statement that history served the purpose of integrating the individual into the wider community, and as such history had the need to provide a "higher meaning" to create the proper national consciousness in the individual, who otherwise would lack this national consciousness. Habermas accused Stürmer on marching to a "geopolitical drumbeat" with his depiction of German history determined by geographical factors requiring authoritarian government. He wrote Stürmer was trying to create a "vicarious religion" in German history intended to serve as a "...kind of NATO philosophy colored with German nationalism".

In response to Habermas’s essay, Stürmer in a letter to the editor of the Frankfurter Allgemeine Zeitung published on 16 August 1986, wrote that Habermas was confusing the “national question” with the “German question”, and argued that the German predicament was due to Germany’s geographical situation in the heart of Europe. He denied seeking to “endow” history with a "higher meaning", accusing Habermas of seeking to do that. Stürmer charged that Habermas had created an "indictment that even fabricates its own sources", and ended his letter with the remark about Habermas "It's a shame about this man who once had something to say".

Replying to Stürmer, Habermas in his "Note" of 23 February 1987, accused Stürmer of having the "chutzpah" to deny his own views when he wrote that he was not seeking to "endow" history with a "higher meaning", and quoted from Stürmer's book Dissonanzen des Fortschritts to support his contention. In response to Habermas, Stürmer in his "Postscript" of 25 April 1987, accused Habermas of being a Marxist who was responsible for "the invention of fact-free scholarship". Stürmer claimed that Habermas had played an "obscene role" in the West German election of 1987 by labeling anyone he disliked as a Nazi, and that the reasons for Habermas's attack on him were to help the SPD in the election. Stürmer charged that Habermas was guilty of misquotation, and of making confusing statements such as his claim that he was working to create a "NATO philosophy" while seeking to bring Germany closer to the West.

Many of Stürmer's critics in the Historikerstreit such as Hans-Ulrich Wehler and Jürgen Kocka, accused Stürmer of attempting to white-wash the Nazi past, a charge Stürmer vehemently rejected. In response to Stürmer's geographical theories about how Germany's "land in the middle" status had forced authoritarianism on the Germans, Kocka argued in an essay entitled "Hitler Should Not Be Repressed by Stalin and Pol Pot" published in the Frankfurter Rundschau on 23 September 1986, that “Geography is not destiny” Kocka wrote that both Switzerland and Poland were also "lands in the middle", and yet neither country went in the same authoritarian direction as Germany. Martin Broszat accused Stürmer of attempting to create an "ersatz religion" in German history that Broszat argued was more appropriate for the pre-modern era then 1986. Hans Mommsen wrote Stürmer's attempts to create a national consensus on a version of German history that all Germans could take pride in was a reflection that the German rightists could not stomach modern German history, and were now looking to create a version of the German past that German rightists could enjoy. Mommsen charged that to find the "lost history", Stürmer was working towards "relativizing" Nazi crimes to give Germans a history they could be proud of.

However, Mommsen argued that even modern right-wing German historians might have difficulty with Stürmer's "technocratic instrumentalization" of German history, which Mommsen claimed was Stürmer's way of "relativizing" Nazi crimes. In another essay, Mommsen argued that Stürmer's assertion that he who controls the past also controls the future, his work as a co-editor with the Frankfurter Allgemeine Zeitung newspaper which had been publishing articles by Ernst Nolte and Joachim Fest denying the “singularity” of the Holocaust, and his work as an advisor to Chancellor Kohl should cause "concern" with historians.

Stürmer was attacked by Habermas and Wehler for writing the following:

"A pluralism of values and interests, when there is no longer any common ground, when it is no longer bunted by economic growth, no longer subdued by the acceptance of responsibility, leads sooner or later to social civil war, as at the end of the Weimar Republic... Social conflicts, competition regarding the values of our communal order, the heterogeneity of goals and the multiplicity of answers to the question of the meaning of life: all of these are a constitutive part of a pluralistic, free society. The market economy is not only its economic basis, it is also a metaphor for its political existence. But conflicts must be limited: through the legal order, through the values of the constitution, through a consensus about the past, present and future. When conflicts do not remain within these boundaries, they shatter the communal order".

Habermas accused Stürmer of believing that "a pluralism of values and interests leads, when there is no longer any common ground...sooner or later to social civil war". Hans-Ulrich Wehler called Stürmer's work "a strident declaration of war against a key element of the consensus upon which the socio-political life of this second republic has rested heretofore". Stürmer's defenders such as the American historian Jerry Muller argued that Wehler and Habermas were guilty of misquoting Stürmer, and of unjustly linking him with Ernst Nolte as a sort of guilt by association argument.

In response to his critics, Stürmer in an essay entitled "How Much History Weights" published in the Frankfurter Allgemeine Zeitung on 26 November 1986, wrote that France was a major power in the world because the French had a history to be proud of, and claimed that West Germany could only play the same role in the world if only they had the same national consensus about pride in their history as did the French. As the example of the sort of history that he wanted to see written in Germany, Stürmer used Fernand Braudel's The Identity of France volumes. Stürmer wrote that Braudel and the other historians of the Annales School had made geography the centre of their studies of French and European history while at the same time promoting a sense of French identity that gave the French a history to be proud of. Stürmer went on to argue that the German people had not had a really positive view of their past since the end of the Holy Roman Empire, and this lack of a German identity to be proud of was responsible for all of the disasters of German history since then. Stürmer asserted "All of our interpretations of Germany had collapsed". As a result, he claimed that at present, the German people were living in historical "rubble", and that the Federal Republic was doomed unless the Germans once again had a sense of history that provided the necessary sense of national identity and pride.

The classicist Christian Meier, who was president of the German Historical Association in 1986 wrote that Stürmer was seeking to make history serve his conservative politics by arguing that Germans needed a history capable of creating a national identity that would allow Germans to face the challenge of the Cold War with pride and confidence in their future. Meier argued that Habermas was correct in expressing his concerns about Stürmer’s work, but asserted that Habermas had wrongly accused the Atlanticist Stürmer of seeking to revive the original concept of the Sonderweg, that of Germany as a great Central European power that was neither of the West nor of the East. That aside, Meier felt that Stürmer’s claim that the future belonged to those who controlled the past, and that it was the duty of German historians to ensure the right sort of future by writing the right sort of history was troubling. Imanuel Geiss wrote that Stürmer was acting within his rights in expressing his right-wing views, and arguing against Habermas claimed there was nothing wrong in claiming that geography was a factor in German history.

The British historian Richard J. Evans who was one of Stürmer's fiercer critics accused Stürmer in his 1989 book In Hitler's Shadow of being an apparent believer that:

"...Germany can only be a stable, peaceful power, as it was under Bismarck, on the basis of an authoritarian political system allied to a strong and unified national consciousness. If the logic of geopolitics holds good, then the same must be true today. Stürmer argues repeatedly that too much pluralism of values and interests, unchecked by a unifying national consensus, destabilized Wilhelmine Germany and helped overthrow the Weimar Republic, once it got into economic difficulties. Thus for today he seeks nothing less than the creation of a substitute religion, a nationalist faith held by all, which will lend calculability to West Germany's foreign policy by providing its citizens with a new sense of identity held together by patriotism, and resting on a unitary, undisputed, and positive consciousness of German history, unsullied by negative guilt feelings about the German past".

Along the same lines, Evans criticized Stürmer for his emphasis on the modernity and totalitarianism of National Socialism, the role of Hitler, and the discontinuities between the Imperial, Weimar and Nazi periods. In Evans's view, the exact opposite was the case with National Socialism as a badly disorganized, anti-modern movement with deep roots in the German past, and the role of Hitler much smaller than the one Stürmer credited him with. Evans accused Stürmer of having no real interest in the collapse of Weimar, and only using the Nazi Machtergreifung as a way of making contemporary political points. Evans denounced Stürmer for writing a laudatory biography of Otto von Bismarck, which he felt marked a regression to the Great man theory of history and an excessive focus on political history. In Evans's opinion, a social historical approach with the emphasis on society was a better way of understanding the German past. In his 1989 book about the Historikerstreit, In Hitler's Shadow, Evans stated that he believed that the exchanges during the Historikerstreit had destroyed Stürmer's reputation as a serious historian.

=== Post-1980s work ===
Much of Stürmer's work since the Historikerstreit has been concerned with creating the sense of national identity he feels Germans are missing. In his 1992 book, Die Grenzen der Macht, Stürmer suggested that German history be viewed in the long-term starting from the 17th century to the 20th century to find the "national and trans-national traditions and patterns worth cherishing". Stürmer argued that traditions were tolerance for religious minorities, civic values, federalism and striking the fine balance between the peripheries and the center. In a July 1992 interview, Stürmer called his historical work a "bid to prevent Hitler remaining the final, unavoidable object of German history, or indeed its one and only starting point".

Stürmer's last book, a biography of the Russian Prime Minister and former President Vladimir Putin, appeared in 2008. A British reviewer praised Stürmer for his refusal to hold Putin's KGB background against him and for his willingness to accept Putin for who he was. Much of Stürmer's biography was based upon his interviews with Putin during the annual meetings of the Valdai group.

== Publications ==
- Putin and the Rise of Russia: The Country That Came in From the Cold, London: Orion 2008 ISBN 978-0-297-85509-5
- "Balance from Beyond the Sea", pages 145–153 from The Washington Quarterly, Volume 24, Number 3, Summer 2001
- The German Empire, 1870–1918, New York : Random House, 2000 ISBN 0-679-64090-8; London: Weidenfeld & Nicolson, 2000 ISBN 0-297-64621-4
- (editor) The German Century London: Weidenfeld and Nicolson, 1999 ISBN 0-297-82524-0.
- (co-edited with Robert D. Blackwill) Allies Divided : Transatlantic Policies for the Greater Middle East, Cambridge, Mass.; London : MIT Press, 1997 ISBN 0-262-52244-6.
- "History in a Land Without History" pages 16–17; “Letter to the Editor of the Frankfurter Allgemeine Zeitung, August 16, 1986” pages 61–62; "How Much History Weighs" pages 196–197; and "Postscript, April 25, 1987" pages 266-267 from Forever In The Shadow of Hitler? edited by Ernst Piper, Atlantic Highlands: Humanities Press, 1993.
- Dissonanzen des Fortschritts, Piper Verleg, Munich, 1986.
- Die Reichsgründung: Deutscher Nationalstaat und europäisches Gleichgewicht im Zeitalter Bismarcks, München: Deutscher Taschenbuch Verlag, 1984 ISBN 3-423-04504-3.
- Das ruhelose Reich: Deutschland 1866–1918, Berlin: Severin und Siedler, 1983 ISBN 3-88680-051-2.
- Die Weimarer Republik : belagerte Civitas, Königstein/Ts. : Verlagsgruppe Athenäum, Hain, Scriptor, Hanstein, 1980 ISBN 3-445-12064-1.
- “An Economy of Delight: Court Artisans of the Eighteenth Century” pages 496-528 from The Business History Review, Volume 53, No. 4 Winter 1979.
- “'Bois des Indes' and the Economics of Luxury Furniture in the Time of David Roentgen” pages 799-807 from The Burlington Magazine, Volume 120, No. 909, December 1978.
- “Caesar's Laurel Crown--the Case for a Comparative Concept” pages 203-207 from The Journal of Modern History, Volume 49, No. 2 June 1977.
- Regierung und Reichstag im Bismarckstaat 1871–1880: Cäsarismus oder Parlamentarismus, Düsseldorf : Droste, 1974
- Bismarck und die preußisch-deutsche Politik, 1871–1890, München: Deutscher Taschenbuch-Verlag, 1970.
- (Editor) Das kaiserliche Deutschland; Politik und Gesellschaft, 1870–1918, Düsseldorf, Droste 1970.
