= The Roots of National Socialism =

Book by Rohan Butler

The Roots of National Socialism, 1783-1933
- First edition
- Author: Rohan Butler
- Genre: Non-fiction
- Publisher: Faber & Faber
- Publication date: June 1941

The Roots of National Socialism, 1783-1933 is a 1941 book by Rohan Butler. It is a survey of the German outlook on society from 1783 to 1933. It details the intellectual developments leading to the ideology of Nazism.

It was first published in June 1941 by Faber & Faber (London) as a 310-page hardcover. E. P. Dutton & co. (New York) republished it in 1942, followed by H. Fertig (New York) in 1968, and AMS Press (New York) in 1985 (ISBN 0-404-16917-1).

== Contents ==
- I. Background
- II. Romanticism 1783–1815
- III. Reaction 1815–1848
- IV. Unification 1848–1871
- V. Empire 1871–1918
- VI. Republic 1918–1933
- VII. Foreground
- Index
