= Hans-Ulrich Wehler =

German historian (1931–2014)

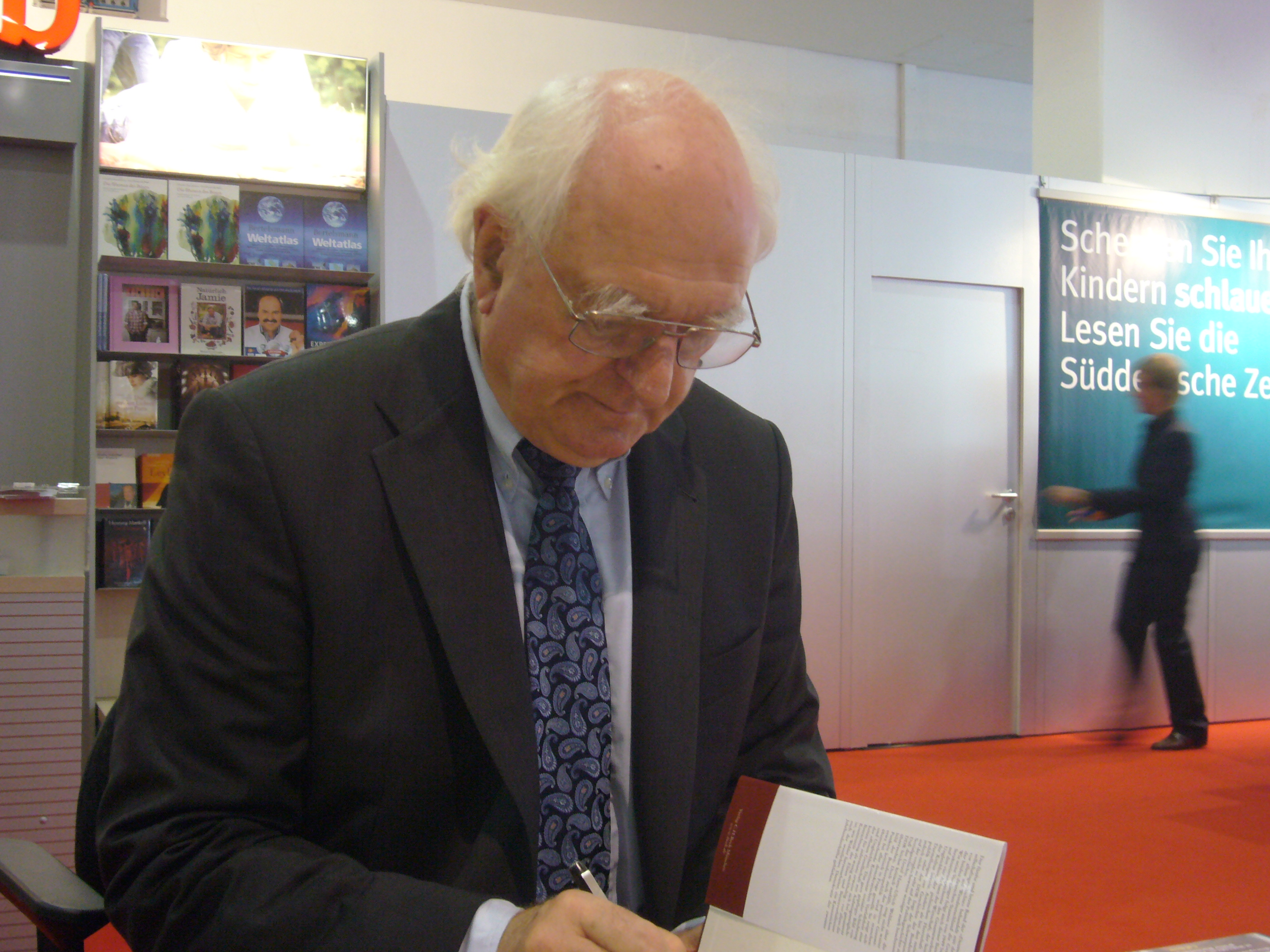
- Born: September 11, 1931; Freudenberg, Province of Westphalia, Free State of Prussia, Weimar Republic
- Died: July 5, 2014 (aged 82); Bielefeld, North Rhine-Westphalia, Germany
- Education: University of Cologne
- Known for: Bielefeld School
- Scientific career
- Fields: History, sociology
- Workplaces: Bielefeld University
- Doctoral advisor: Theodor Schieder

Hans-Ulrich Wehler (September 11, 1931 – July 5, 2014) was a German left-liberal historian known for his role in promoting social history through the "Bielefeld School", and for his critical studies of 19th-century Germany.

== Life ==
Wehler was born in Freudenberg, Westphalia. He studied history and sociology in Cologne, Bonn and, on a Fulbright scholarship, at Ohio University in the United States; working for six months as a welder and a truck driver in Los Angeles. He took his PhD in 1960 under Theodor Schieder at the University of Cologne. His dissertation examined social democracy and the nation state and the question of nationality in Germany between 1840 and 1914. His postdoctoral thesis on Bismarck and imperialism, opened the way for an academic career. His habilitation project on "American imperialism between 1865 and 1900", supported by the American Council of Learned Societies, permitted him to do research in American libraries in 1962–1963 and resulted in two books. In all he spent six years in the US and was strongly influenced by its academic structures and by research in comparative modernization.

Wehler taught at the University of Cologne (1968–1970), at the Free University of Berlin (1970–1971) and at Bielefeld University (1971–1996).

Wehler and his colleagues Jürgen Kocka and Reinhart Koselleck founded the Bielefeld School of historical analysis. Instead of emphasizing the political aspects of history, which is the conventional approach, its proponents concentrate on sociocultural developments. History as "historical social science", as Wehler described it, has been explored mainly in the context of studies of German society in the 19th and the 20th centuries. He served as editor of the new journal Geschichte und Gesellschaft from 1975.

He married Renate Pfitsch in 1958 and had three children with her.

In 2003, Wehler won the NRW State Prize.

== Bielefeld School ==
Wehler is a leader of the so-called Bielefeld School, a group of historians who use the methods of the social sciences to analyze history.

Social history developed within West German historiography in the 1950s the 1960s as a successor to the national history, which was discredited by National Socialism. The German brand of "history of society" (Gesellschaftsgeschichte) has been known from its beginning in the 1960s for its application of sociological and political modernization theories to German history. Modernization theory was presented by Wehler and the Bielefeld School as the way to transform "traditional" German history, that is, national political history, centred on a few "great men," into an integrated and comparative history of German society encompassing societal structures outside politics. Wehler drew upon the modernization theory of Max Weber, with concepts also from Karl Marx, Otto Hintze, Gustav Schmoller, Werner Sombart and Thorstein Veblen.

Wehler's Deutsche Gesellschaftsgeschichte (1987-), is a comprehensive five-volume history of German society in the 18th to the 20th centuries. Each volume approaches historical processes from a social history perspective, organized under the themes of demographics, economics, and social equality. His detailed structural analysis of developmental processes supported by a vast body of notes and statistics sometimes obscures the larger context. Nonetheless, patterns of continuity and change in the social fabric are emphasized. More than a historiographical synthesis of Ranke and Marx (envisioned by some German historians after the catastrophe of World War I), Wehler's work incorporates Max Weber's concepts of authority, economy, and culture and strives toward a concept of "total history."

Volumes 1-2 cover the period from feudalism through the Revolution of 1848. Volume 3 Von der "Deutschen Doppelrevolution" bis zum Beginn des Ersten Weltkrieges 1849-1914 (1995) employs Wehler's longtime emphasis on a German Sonderweg or "special path" as the root of Nazism and the German catastrophe in the 20th century. Wehler places the origins of Germany's path to disaster in the 1860s and the 1870s, when economic modernization took place, but political modernization failed to take place and the old Prussian rural elite remained in firm control of the army, diplomacy and the civil service.

Traditional, aristocratic, premodern society battled an emerging capitalist, bourgeois, modernizing society. Recognizing the importance of modernizing forces in industry and the economy and in the cultural realm, Wehler argued that reactionary traditionalism dominated the political hierarchy of power in Germany, as well as social mentalities and in class relations (Klassenhabitus). Wehler's Deutsche Gesellschaftsgeschichte: Vom Beginn des Ersten Weltkrieges bis zur Gründung der beiden Deutschen Staaten 1914-1949 (2003) is the fourth volume of his monumental history of German society. Germany's catastrophic politics between 1914 and 1945 are interpreted in terms of a delayed modernization of its political structures.

At the core of Wehler's fourth volume is his treatment of "the middle class" and "revolution," each of which was instrumental in shaping the 20th century. Wehler's examination of Nazi rule is shaped by his concept of "charismatic domination," which focuses heavily on Adolf Hitler. The fifth volume extended to 1990; none of the series has yet been translated into English.

From the 1980s, however, the Bielefeld school was increasingly challenged by proponents of the "cultural turn" for not incorporating culture in the history of society, for reducing politics to society, and for reducing individuals to structures. Historians of society inverted the traditional positions they criticized (on the model of Marx's inversion of Hegel). As a result, the problems pertaining to the positions criticized were not resolved but only turned on their heads. The traditional focus on individuals was inverted into a modern focus on structures, and traditional emphatic understanding was inverted into modern causal explanation.

== Champion of the Sonderweg theory ==
Wehler specialised in research into the German Empire. He was one of the more famous proponents of the Sonderweg (Special Path) thesis that argues Germany in the 19th century underwent only partial modernization. Wehler has argued that Germany was the only nation to be created in Western Europe through a military "revolution from above", which happened to occur at the same time that the agricultural revolution was fading and the Industrial Revolution was beginning in Central Europe. As a result, the economic sphere was modernized and the social sphere partially modernized. Politically, in Wehler's opinion, the new unified Germany retained values that were aristocratic and feudal, anti-democratic and pre-modern. In Wehler's view, the efforts of the reactionary German elite to retain power led to the outbreak of the First World War in 1914, the failure of the Weimar Republic and the coming of Nazi Germany.

Wehler has especially criticised what he terms Otto von Bismarck's strategy of "negative integration" by which Bismarck sought to create a sense of Deutschtum (Germanism) and to consolidate his power by subjecting various minority groups (such as Roman Catholics, Alsatians, Poles and Social Democrats) to discriminatory laws. Wehler is one of the foremost advocates of the "Berlin War Party" historical school, which assigns the sole and exclusive responsibility for World War I to the German government.

Wehler sees the aggressive foreign policies of the German Empire, especially under Kaiser Wilhelm II, largely as part of an effort on the part of the government to distract the German people from the lack of internal democracy. The Primat der Innenpolitik ("primacy of domestic politics") argument to explain foreign policy, for which Wehler owes much to the work of Eckart Kehr, places him against the traditional Primat der Außenpolitik ("primacy of foreign politics") thesis championed by historians, such as Gerhard Ritter, Klaus Hildebrand, Andreas Hillgruber and Ludwig Dehio. Wehler advocates the concept of social imperialism, which he defined as "the diversions outwards of internal tensions and forces of change in order to preserve the social and political status quo", and as a "defensive ideology" to counter the "disruptive effects of industrialization on the social and economic structure of Germany".

Wehler thought that the German government had used social imperialism as a device to allow it to distract public attention from domestic problems to the benefit of preserving the existing social and political order. Wehler argued that the dominant elites used social imperialism as the glue to hold together a fractured society and to maintain popular support for the social status quo. He further argued that German colonial policy in the 1880s provides the first example of social imperialism in action, followed by the "Tirpitz Plan" to expand the German Navy from 1897 onwards. That point of view sees groups such as the Colonial Society and the Navy League as government instruments to mobilise public support. Wehler saw the demands for annexing most of Europe and Africa in World War I as the pinnacle of social imperialism.

In the 1970s, Wehler became involved in a somewhat-discordant and acrimonious debate with Hildebrand and Hillgruber over the merits of both approaches to diplomatic history. Hillgruber and Hildebrand argued for the traditional Primat der Aussenpolitik approach with empirical research on the foreign-policy making elite, but Wehler argued for the Primat der Innenpolitik approach, treating diplomatic history as a sub-branch of social history with the focus on theoretical research. The two major intellectual influences Wehler cites are Karl Marx and Max Weber.

== Philosophy of history ==
Wehler often criticised traditional German historiography with its emphasis on political events, the role of the individual in history and history as an art as unacceptably conservative and incapable of properly explaining the past.

Wehler saw history as a social science and contends that social developments are frequently more important than politics. In his view, history is a "critical social science" that must examine both the "temporal structures" of a society and encourage a "freer critical awareness of society". Wehler advocated an approach he calls Historische Sozialwissenschaft (historical social science), which integrates elements of history, sociology, economics and anthropology to study, in a holistic fashion, long-term social changes in a society In Wehler's view, Germany between 1871 and 1945 was dominated by a social structure that retarded modernization in some areas but allowed it in others. For Wehler, Germany's defeat in 1945 finally smashed the "premodern" social structure and allowed Germany become a normal "Western" country.

== Historikerstreit and other controversies ==
Wehler was a leading critic of what he saw as efforts by reactionary historians to whitewash German history. He played an important part in the Historikerstreit (historians' dispute) of the 1980s. The debate began after an article by the philosopher Ernst Nolte was published in the German newspaper Frankfurter Allgemeine Zeitung on June 6 of 1986. In his article, Nolte claimed that there was a causal connection between the Gulag and Nazi extermination camps, the previous having supposedly affected the latter, which he called an überschießende Reaktion ("overshooting reaction"). That infuriated many (mainly left wing) intellectuals, such as Wehler and the philosopher Jürgen Habermas, who strongly rejected Nolte's thesis and presented a case for seeing the crimes of Nazi Germany as uniquely evil, which Nolte's defenders claimed that Nolte had never disputed in the first place.

Wehler was ferocious in his criticism of Nolte and wrote several articles and books, which Wehler himself admitted to be polemical attacks on Nolte. In his 1988 book on the Historikerstreit, Entsorgung der deutschen Vergangenheit?: ein polemischer Essay zum "Historikerstreit" (Exoneration of the German Past?: A Polemical Essay about the 'Historikerstreit), Wehler criticised every aspect of Nolte's views and called the Historikerstreit a "political struggle" for the historical understanding of the German past between "a cartel devoted to repressing and excusing" the memory of the Nazi years, of which Nolte was the chief member, against "the representatives of a liberal-democratic politics, of an enlightened, self-critical position, of a rationality which is critical of ideology".

Besides Nolte, Wehler also attacked the work of Michael Stürmer as "a strident declaration of war against a key element of the consensus upon which the socio-political life of this second republic has rested heretofore" During the Historikerstreit, Wehler was one of the few historians to endorse Jürgen Habermas's method of attacking Andreas Hillgruber by creating a sentence about "tested senior officials in Nazi Party in the East" out of a long sentence in which Hillgruber had said no such thing on the grounds that it was a secondary issue of no real importance. The British historian Richard J. Evans, normally a fierce critic of Hillgruber, felt that Habermas and Wehler had gone too far in attacking Hillgruber with the line about "tested senior officials".

In a 1989 essay, the American historian Jerry Muller criticised Wehler as a "leading Left-Liberal historian" who used the Historikerstreit to smear neoconservatives unjustly by the Nazi tag. Muller went on to write of the "interesting peculiarity of the political culture of German Left-liberal intellectuals" such as Wehler, who referred to Stalinist repression in the Soviet Union as "the excesses of the Russian Civil War" and argued that there was no comparison between Soviet and German history. Instead, Wehler suggested that the only valid comparisons were between the history of Germany and that of other Western nations. Muller criticised Wehler for his lack of interest in Soviet history and his unwillingness to engage in a comparative history between Eastern and Western nations, instead of just Western nations.

Along somewhat-similar lines to the stance that he had taken during the Historikerstreit, Wehler in September 1990 strongly condemned a newspaper opinion piece by Harold James, who suggested national legends and myths were needed to sustain national identity.

== Criticism ==
Wehler's work has been criticized.

=== By right-wingers ===
From the right, Otto Pflanze claimed that Wehler's use of such terms as "Bonapartism", "social imperialism", "negative integration" and Sammlungspolitik ("the politics of rallying together") went beyond mere heuristic devices and instead become a form of historical fiction. The German conservative historian Thomas Nipperdey has argued that Wehler presented German elites as more united than they were, focused too much on forces from above and too little on forces from below in 19th-century German society and presented too stark of a contrast between the forces of order and stabilization and the forces of democracy with no explanation for the German Empire's relative stability. Nipperdey thinks that Wehler failed to explain how the Weimar Republic occurred since Wehler considered that prior to 1918, the forces of authoritarianism were so strong and those of democracy so weak. In a 1975 book review of Wehler's Das Deutsche Kaiserreich, Nipperdey concluded that a proper history of the German Empire period must be written by placing German history in a comparative European and trans-Atlantic perspective, which might allow the end of "our fixation on the struggle with our great-grandfathers".

=== By left-wingers ===
From the left, Wehler has been criticized by two British Marxist historians, David Blackbourn and Geoff Eley. Their 1980 book Mythen deutscher Geschichtsschreibung (translated into English in 1984 as The Peculiarities of German History) rejected the entire concept of the Sonderweg as a flawed construct supported by "a curious mixture of idealistic analysis and vulgar materialism", which led to an "exaggerated linear continuity between the nineteenth century and the 1930s". In Blackbourn and Eley's view, there was no Sonderweg, and it is ahistorical to ask why Germany did not become Britain for the simple reasons that Germany is Germany and Britain is Britain. Moreover, Eley and Blackbourn argued that after 1890, there was a tendency towards greater democratization in German society with the growth of civil society, as reflected in the growth of trade unions and a more-or-less free press.

In addition, Eley contends that there were three flaws in Wehler's theory of social imperialism. The first is that Wehler credited leaders such as Admiral Alfred von Tirpitz and Prince Bernhard von Bülow with a greater degree of vision than they really had. The second was that many of the right-wing pressure groups who advocated an imperialist policy for Germany were not government creations and often even demanded policies that were far more aggressive than those that the government wanted to undertake. The third was that many of the groups that advocated imperialism demanded a policy of political and social reform at home to complement imperialism abroad. Eley argued that thinking about social imperialism requires a broader picture with an interaction between above and below and a wider view of the relationship between imperialism abroad and domestic politics.

== Goldhagen Controversy ==
During the "Goldhagen Controversy" of 1996, Wehler was a leading critic of Daniel Goldhagen, especially in regards to the latter's claims in his book Hitler's Willing Executioners about an alleged culture of murderous German "eliminationist anti-Semitism". However, Wehler was more sympathetic towards Goldhagen's claims on the motives of Holocaust perpetrators. The Canadian historian Fred Kautz called Wehler an anti-Semite for his attacks on Goldhagen. Kautz wrote "He [Wehler] doesn't dare say it openly that he thinks Goldhagen is incapable of writing about the Holocaust because he is a Jew.... It's flabbergasting what perverse ideas are dreamt up in the studies of German professors, where according to an ancient legend, one seeks the truth unperturbed, sine ira et studio ('with diligence and without anger'): the victims of history should not be allowed to write their own history!"

In 2000, Wehler became the eighth German historian to be inducted as an honorary member of the American Historical Association. Wehler accepted with some reluctance as previous German historians who had become honorary members included Leopold von Ranke, Gerhard Ritter and Friedrich Meinecke.

In a 2006 interview, Wehler supported the imprisonment of David Irving for Holocaust denial in Austria: "The denial of such an unimaginable murder of millions, one third of whom were children under the age of 14, cannot simply be accepted as something protected by the freedom of speech". In his final years, Wehler had been a leading critic of Turkey's possible accession to the European Union.

== Work ==
- Bismarck und der Imperialismus, 1969.
- "Bismarck's Imperialism 1862–1890" Past and Present, No. 48, August 1970. pages 119–155 online edition
- "Industrial Growth and Early German Imperialism" from Studies in the Theory of Imperialism edited by Roger Owen and Bob Sutcliffe, London: Longman, 1972
- Das Deutsche Kaiserreich, 1871-1918, 1973; translated from the German by Kim Traynor as The German Empire, 1871-1918, Leamington Spa: Berg Publishers, 1985, ISBN 0-907582-22-2.
- Geschichte als historische Sozialwissenschaft, 1973.
- Krisenherde des Kaiserreichs, 1871-1918, 1973.
- Modernisierungstheorie und Geschichte, 1975.
- Historische Sozialwissenschaft und Geschichtsschreibung, 1980.
- ""Deutscher Sonderweg" oder allgemeine Probleme des westlichen Kapitalismus" pages 478-487 from Merkur, Volume 5, 1981.
- "Historiography in Germany Today" from Observations on "The Spiritual Situation of the Age": Contemporary German Perspectives, edited by Jürgen Habermas, 1984.
- Preussen ist wieder chic: Politik und Polemik in zwanzig Essays, 1985.
- Deutsche Gesellschaftsgeschichte, vol. 1-5, 1987-2008.
  - David F. Crew. "Review of Hans-Ulrich Wehler, Deutsche Gesellschaftsgeschichte-Vierter Band: Vom Beginn des Ersten Weltkriegs bis zur Gründung der beiden deutschen Staaten 1914-1949," H-German, H-Net Reviews, June, 2005. online review
- Entsorgung der deutschen Vergangenheit: ein polemischer Essay zum "Historikerstreit", 1988.
- "Unburdening the German Past? A Preliminary Assessment", pages 214-223 from Reworking The Past: Hitler, the Holocaust, and the Historians' Debate edited by Peter Baldwin, Boston: Beacon Press, 1990, ISBN 0-8070-4302-8.
- Nationalismus und Nationalstaat: Studien zum nationalen Problem im modernen Europa, co-edited with Otto Dann and Theodor Schieder, 1991.
- Die Gegenwart als Geschichte, 1995.
- "The Goldhagen Controversy: Agonising Problems, Scholarly Failure, and the Political Dimension", pages 80–91 from German History, Volume 15, 1997.
