= Bielefeld School =

Group of German historians

- Type: Group of historians
- Purpose: To promote social history and political history using quantification and the methods of political science and sociology
- Location: Bielefeld University
- Region served: Germany
- Methods: Concentrates on socio-cultural developments
- Key people: Hans-Ulrich Wehler, Jürgen Kocka and Reinhart Koselleck

The Bielefeld School is a group of German historians based originally at Bielefeld University who promote social history and political history using quantification and the methods of political science and sociology. The leaders include(d) Hans-Ulrich Wehler, Jürgen Kocka and Reinhart Koselleck. Instead of emphasizing the personalities of great historical leaders, as in the conventional approach, it concentrates on socio-cultural developments. History as "historical social science" (as Wehler described it) has mainly been explored in the context of studies of German society in the nineteenth and twentieth centuries. The movement has published the scholarly journal Geschichte und Gesellschaft: Zeitschrift fur Historische Sozialwissenschaft since 1975.

Social history developed within West German historiography during the 1950s–60s as the successor to the national history discredited by National Socialism. The German brand of "history of society"—Gesellschaftsgeschichte—has been known from its beginning in the 1960s for its application of sociological and political modernization theories to German history. Modernization theory was presented by Wehler and his Bielefeld School as the way to transform "traditional" German history, that is, national political history, centered on a few "great men," into an integrated and comparative history of German society encompassing societal structures outside politics. Wehler drew upon the modernization theory of Max Weber, with concepts also from Karl Marx, Otto Hintze, Gustav Schmoller, Werner Sombart and Thorstein Veblen.

== Deutsche Gesellschaftsgeschichte ==
Deutsche Gesellschaftsgeschichte (1987–) is Wehler's comprehensive 5-volume history of German society in the eighteenth-twentieth centuries. Each volume approaches historical processes from a social history perspective, organized under the themes of demographics, economics, and social equality. His detailed structural analysis of developmental processes supported by a vast body of notes and statistics sometimes obscures the larger context. Nonetheless, patterns of continuity and change in the social fabric are emphasized. More than a historiographical synthesis of Ranke and Marx (envisioned by some German historians after the catastrophe of World War I), Wehler's work incorporates Max Weber's concepts of authority, economy, and culture and strives toward a concept of "total history."

Volumes 1–2 cover the period from feudalism through the Revolution of 1848. Volume 3 Von der "Deutschen Doppelrevolution" bis zum Beginn des Ersten Weltkrieges 1849–1914 (1995) employs Wehler's longtime emphasis on a German Sonderweg or "special path" as the root of Nazism and the German catastrophe in the twentieth century. Wehler places the origins of Germany's path to disaster in the 1860s–1870s, when economic modernization took place, but political modernization did not happen and the old Prussian rural elite remained in firm control of the army, diplomacy and the civil service. Traditional, aristocratic, premodern society battled an emerging capitalist, bourgeois, modernizing society. Recognizing the importance of modernizing forces in industry and the economy and in the cultural realm, Wehler argues that reactionary traditionalism dominated the political hierarchy of power in Germany, as well as social mentalities and in class relations (Klassenhabitus). Wehler's Deutsche Gesellschaftsgeschichte: Vom Beginn des Ersten Weltkrieges bis zur Gründung der Beiden Deutschen Staaten 1914–1949 (2003) is the fourth volume of his monumental history of German society. The catastrophic German politics between 1914 and 1945 are interpreted in terms of a delayed modernization of its political structures. At the core of Wehler's fourth volume is his treatment of "the middle class" and "revolution," each of which was instrumental in shaping the twentieth century. Wehler's examination of Nazi rule is shaped by his concept of "charismatic domination," which focuses heavily on Adolf Hitler. The fifth volume will extend to 1990; none of the series has yet been translated into English.

== Challenges ==
British historian of Germany Richard J. Evans disagreed with the Bielefeld school regarding the Sonderweg thesis. Instead he argued for the roots of Germany’s political development in the first half of the twentieth century in a "failed bourgeois revolution" in 1848. Influenced by the New Left, Evans was a member of a group of young British historians who in the 1970s sought to examine German history in the Imperial period "from below." In 1978, as editor of a collection of essays by young British historians entitled Society And Politics In Wilhelmine Germany, he launched a critique of the "top-down" approach of the Bielefeld School. Evans and the others wanted a perspective from the Left that stressed the importance of the working class by highlighting "the importance of the grass roots of politics and the everyday life and experience of ordinary people." Along with historians Geoff Eley and David Blackbourn, Evans emphasized the "self-mobilization from below" of key sociopolitical groups, as well as the modernity of National Socialism.

=== Cultural turn ===
From the 1980s, however, the Bielefeld school was increasingly challenged by proponents of the "cultural turn" for not incorporating culture in the history of society, for reducing politics to society, and for reducing individuals to structures. Historians of society inverted the traditional positions they criticized (on the model of Marx's inversion of Hegel). As a result, the problems pertaining to the positions criticized were not resolved but only turned on their heads. The traditional focus on individuals was inverted into a modern focus on structures and traditional emphatic understanding was inverted into modern causal explanation.

Kocka responded by arguing that social history has become so all-pervasive that it has lost its position as the cutting edge within historiography. He says, "But: in the meantime social historians' approaches, viewpoints, topics and results have been accepted and incorporated by many other historians who would not call themselves social historians. Social history has successfully penetrated its opponents." He expects to see a return to social history, this time with more cultural and linguistic elements.

== Studies from Bielefeld School ==
- Kocka, Jürgen. White Collar Workers in America 1890–1940: A Social–Political History in International Perspective. (Sage, 1980).
- Kocka, Jürgen & A. Mitchell, eds. Bourgeois Society in Nineteenth-century Europe. (1993).
- Kocka, Jürgen. Industrial Culture and Bourgeois Society. Business, Labor, and Bureaucracy in Modern Germany. (Berghahn Books, 1999)
- Kocka, Jürgen. "Civil Society: Some remarks on the career of a concept," in: E. Ben-Rafael, Y. Sternberg (eds.): Comparing Modernities, pp. 141–148.
- Wehler, Hans-Ulrich. Sozialdemokratie und Nationalstaat: Nationalitätenfragen in Deutschland 1840-1914 (2d ed., 1971)
- Wehler, Hans-Ulrich. Der Aufstieg des amerikanischen Imperialismus: Studien zur Entwicklung des Imperium Americanum 1865-1900 (1974)
- Wehler, Hans-Ulrich. Grundzüge der amerikanischen Außenpolitik 1750-1900 (1983).
- Wehler, Hans-Ulrich. Bismarck und der Imperialismus (5th ed., 1984)
- Wehler, Hans-Ulrich. "Historiography in Germany Today," in Jürgen Habermas, ed., Observations on The Spiritual Situation of the Age, (1984), 221-59.
- Wehler, Hans-Ulrich. Das deutsche Kaiserreich 1871-1918 (10th ed., 2000; English ed., The German Empire, 1871-1918 (1985, 1997) excerpt and text search
- Wehler, Hans-Ulrich. Politik in der Geschichte (1998), essays
- Wehler, Hans-Ulrich. Die Herausforderung der Kulturgeschichte (1998), essays
- Wehler, Hans-Ulrich. Deutsche Gesellschaftsgeschichte (5 vol 1987- )

== See also ==
- Alltagsgeschichte (lit. 'everyday history') — a German approach to microhistory

== Bibliography ==
- Berman, Sheri. "Modernization in Historical Perspective: The Case of Imperial Germany," World Politics, Volume 53, Number 3, April 2001, pp. 431–462 doi:10.1353/wp.2001.0007
- Blamming, T. C. W. "The French Revolution and the Modernization of Germany." Central European History 1989 22(2): 109-129. ISSN 0008-9389 Fulltext: Ebsco
- Daum, Andreas. "German Historiography in Transatlantic Perspective: Interview with Hans-Ulrich Wehler" GHI Bulletin (2000) online edition
- Fletcher, Roger. "Recent developments in West German Historiography: the Bielefeld School and its critics." German Studies Review (1984): 451-480. in JSTOR
- Kaelble, Hartmut. "Social History in Europe," Journal of Social History, Special Issue: The Futures of Social History 37 (Fall 2003), pp. 29–35.
- Kocka, Jurgen. "Losses, Gains and Opportunities: Social History Today," Journal of Social History, Volume 37, Number 1, Fall 2003, pp. 21–28 doi:10.1353/jsh.2003.0146
- Lorenz, Chris. "'Won't You Tell Me, Where Have All the Good Times Gone'? On the Advantages and Disadvantages of Modernization Theory for History." Rethinking History 2006 10(2): 171-200. ISSN 1364-2529 Fulltext: Ebsco
- Lorenz, Chris. "Beyond Good and Evil? The German Empire of 1871 and Modern German Historiography." Journal of Contemporary History 1995 30(4): 729-765. in Jstor
- Magnússon, Sigurður Gylfi. "Social History as 'Sites of Memory'? The Institutionalizaton of History: Microhistory and the Grand Narrative," Journal of Social History, Volume 39, Number 3, Spring 2006, pp. 891–913 doi:10.1353/jsh.2006.0012
- Sperber, Jonathan. "Master Narratives of Nineteenth-century German History." Central European History 1991 24(1): 69-91. ISSN 0008-9389 Fulltext: Ebsco
- Stearns, Peter N. "Social History Present and Future," Journal of Social History, Special Issue: The Futures of Social History 37 (Fall 2003), pp. 9–20
- Wehler, Hans-Ulrich. "A Guide to Future Research on the Kaiserreich?" Central European History 1996 29(4): 541-572. ISSN 0008-9389 Fulltext: Ebsco
