= Political history =

Type of history which analyzes political events

Political history is the narrative and survey of political events, ideas, movements, organizations of governments, voters, parties, and leaders. It is closely related to other fields of history, including diplomatic history, constitutional history, social history, people's history, and public history. Political history studies the organization and operation of power in large societies.

From approximately the 1960s onwards, the rise of competing subdisciplines, particularly social history and cultural history, led to a decline in the prominence of "traditional" political history, which tended to focus on the activities of political elites. In the two decades from 1975 to 1995, the proportion of professors of history in American universities identifying with social history rose from 31% to 41%, and the proportion of political historians fell from 40% to 30%.

== Political world history ==
The political history of the world examines the history of politics and government on a global scale, including international relations.

== Aspects of political history ==
The first "scientific" political history was written by Leopold von Ranke in Germany in the 19th century. His methodologies profoundly affected how historians critically examine sources; see historiography for a more complete analysis of the methodologies of various approaches to history. An important aspect of political history is the study of ideology as a force for historical change. One author asserts that "political history as a whole cannot exist without the study of ideological differences and their implications." Studies of political history typically centre around a single nation and its political change and development. Some historians identify the growing trend towards narrow specialization in political history during recent decades: "while a college professor in the 1940s sought to identify himself as a "historian", by the 1950s "American historian" was the designation."

From the 1970s onwards, new movements challenged traditional approaches to political history. The development of social history shifted the emphasis away from the study of leaders and national decisions, and towards the role of ordinary people, especially outsiders and minorities. Younger scholars shifted to different issues, usually focused on race, class, and gender, with little room for elites. After 1990, social history itself began to fade, replaced with postmodern and cultural approaches that rejected grand narratives.

=== United States: The new political history ===
Traditional political history focused on major leaders and had long played a dominant role beyond academic historians in the United States. These studies accounted for about 25% of the scholarly books and articles written by American historians before 1950, and about 33% into the 1960s, followed by diplomacy. The arrival in the 1960s and 1970s of a new interest in social history led to the emergence of the "new political history", which saw young scholars place much more emphasis on voters' behavior and motivations than on politicians. It relied heavily on quantitative methods to integrate social themes, especially regarding ethnicity and religion. The new social science approach was a harbinger of the fading away of interest in Great Men. The eclipse of traditional political approaches during the 1970s was a major shock, though diplomatic history fell even further. It was upstaged by social history, with a race/class/gender model. The number of political articles submitted to the Journal of American History fell by half, from 33% to 15%. Patterson argued that contemporary events, especially the Vietnam War and Watergate, alienated younger scholars from the study of politicians and their deeds. Political history never disappeared, but it never recovered its dominance among scholars, despite its sustained high popularity among the reading public. Some political historians made fun of their own predicament, as when William Leuchtenburg wrote, "the status of the political historians within the profession has sunk to somewhere between that of a faith healer and a chiropractor. Political historians were all right in a way, but you might not want to bring one home to meet the family." Others were more analytical, as when Hugh Davis Graham observed:

The ranks of traditional political historians are depleted, their assumptions and methods discredited, along with the Great White Man whose careers they chronicled.

=== Britain ===
Readman (2009) discusses the historiography of British political history in the 20th century. He describes how British political scholarship largely ignored 20th-century history due to its temporal proximity to the recent past, the unavailability of primary sources, and the potential for bias. The article explores how transitions in scholarship have led to greater interest in 20th-century history among scholars, including less reliance on archival sources, methodological changes in historiography, and the flourishing of new forms of history such as oral history.

=== Germany ===
In the course of the 1960s, however, some German historians (notably Hans-Ulrich Wehler and his cohort) began to rebel against this idea, instead suggesting a "Primacy of Domestic Politics" (Primat der Innenpolitik), in which the insecurities of (in this case German) domestic policy drove the creation of foreign policy. This led to a considerable body of work interpreting the domestic policies of various states and how these influenced their conduct of foreign policy.

=== France ===
The French Annales School had already emphasized the role of geography and economics in history, and the importance of broad, slow cycles rather than the apparent constant movement of the "history of events" in high politics. It downplayed politics and diplomacy. The most important work of the Annales school, Fernand Braudel's The Mediterranean and the Mediterranean World in the Age of Philip II, contains a traditional Rankean diplomatic history of Philip II's Mediterranean policy, but only as the third and shortest section of a work largely focusing on the broad cycles of history in the longue durée ("long term"). The Annales were broadly influential, leading to a turning away from political history towards an emphasis on broader trends of economic and environmental change.

=== Social history ===
In the 1960s and 1970s, an increasing emphasis on giving a voice to the voiceless and writing the history of the underclasses, whether by using the quantitative statistical methods of social history or the more postmodern assessments of cultural history, also undermined the centrality of politics to the historical discipline. Leff noted how social historians "disdained political history as elitist, shallow, altogether passe, and irrelevant to the drama of everyday lives."
