= Jürgen Kocka =

German historian (born 1941)

Professor Emeritus Jürgen Kocka
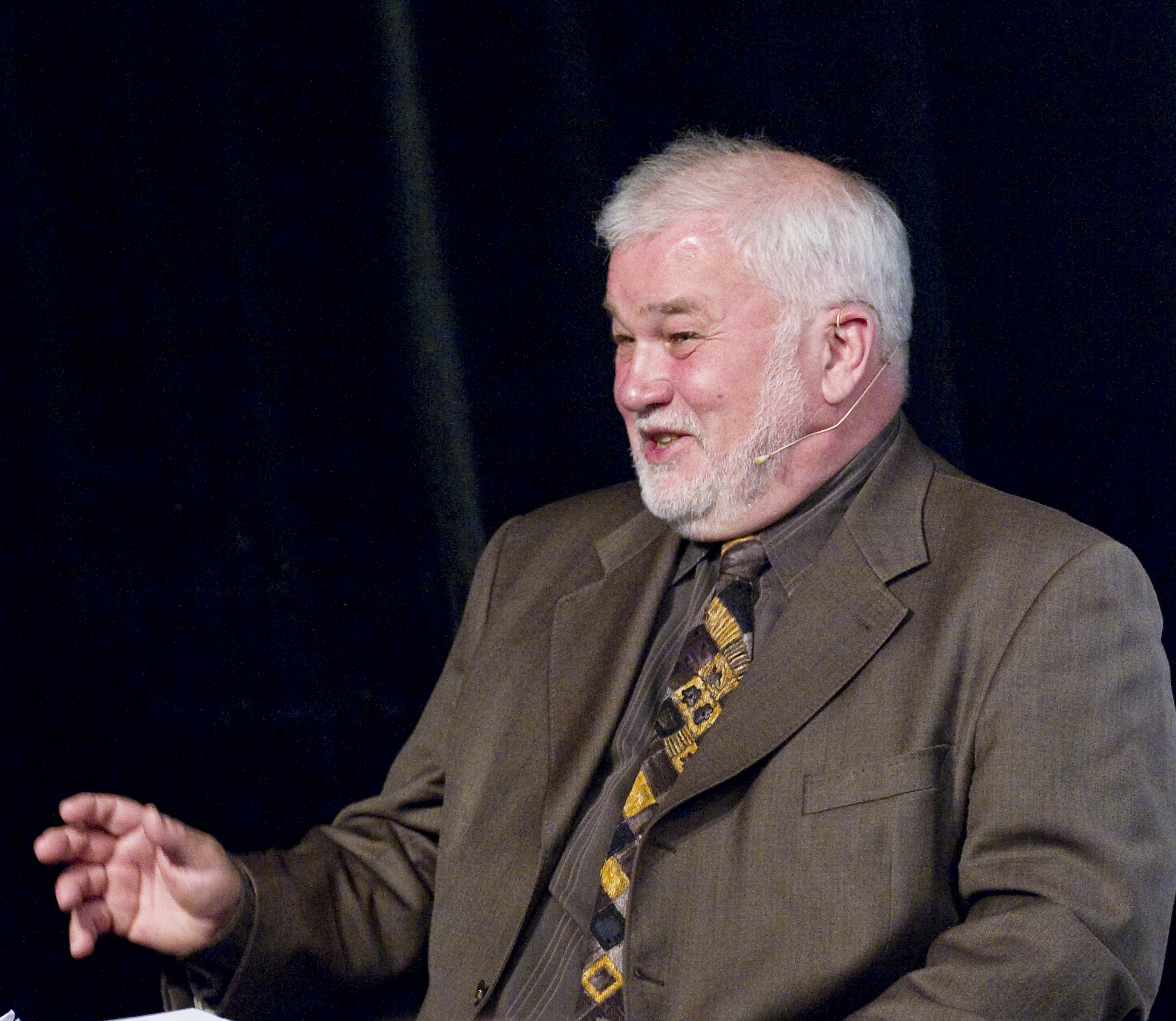
- Kocka in 2011
- Born: April 19, 1941 (age 85); Haindorf, Sudetenland, Germany
- Education: Free University of Berlin (PhD, 1968) Honorary doctorate M.A.
- Years active: 1968-present
- Employer: Free University of Berlin
- Notable work: Capitalism: A Short History Facing Total War: German Society, 1914-1918 Hitler Should Not Be Repressed By Stalin and Pol Pot
- Movement: Bielefeld School; Critical Sonderweg thesis
- Awards: List of awards received by Kocka

Jürgen Kocka (born 19 April 1941 in Haindorf, Sudetenland) is a German historian.

A university professor and former president of the Social Science Research Center Berlin (2001–2007), Kocka is a major figure in the new Social History, especially as represented by the Bielefeld School. He has focused his research on the history of employees in large German and American businesses, and on the history of European bourgeoisie. In the Spring of 2018, Kocka was a Residential Fellow at the Swedish Collegium for Advanced Study in Uppsala, Sweden.

Inspired by the methods of Ernest Labrousse, he attempts to analyze social processes of German society from the perspective of modernisation, industrialization, and the creation of modern Europe.

== Life ==
Kocka was born in Haindorf, and gained his PhD from the Free University of Berlin in 1968.

From 1992 to 1996, Kocka was the founding director and is to date a Senior Fellow of the Centre for Contemporary History in Potsdam. Since 2008, he has been vice president of the Berlin-Brandenburg Academy of Sciences and Humanities.

== Social history ==
Kocka was a leader of the Bielefeld School of the "new social history', and recalls how the historiographical movement introduced a vast range of new topics:

In the 1960s and 1970s, "social history" caught the imagination of a young generation of historians. It became a central concept – and a rallying point – of historiographic revisionism. It meant many things at the same time. It gave priority to the study of particular kinds of phenomena, such as classes and movements, urbanization and industrialization, family and education, work and leisure, mobility, inequality, conflicts and revolutions. It stressed structures and processes over actors and events. It emphasized analytical approaches close to the social sciences rather than by the traditional methods of historical hermeneutics. Frequently social historians sympathized with the causes (as they saw them) of the little people, of the underdog, of popular movements, or of the working class. Social history was both demanded and rejected as a vigorous revisionist alternative to the more established ways of historiography, in which the reconstruction of politics and ideas, the history of events and hermeneutic methods traditionally dominated.

== Historiographical debates ==
Kocka participated in the German Historikerstreit in the late 1980s, alongside Jürgen Habermas in opposition to Ernst Nolte, and supported the Sonderweg explanation of a unique path of German history. In an essay entitled "Hitler Should Not Be Repressed By Stalin and Pol Pot" first published in Die Zeit newspaper on 26 September 1986, Kocka contended against Nolte that the Holocaust was indeed a "singular" event because it had been committed by an advanced Western nation, and argued that Nolte's comparisons of the Holocaust with similar mass killings in Pol Pot's Cambodia, Joseph Stalin's Soviet Union, and Idi Amin's Uganda were "invalid" because of "the backward nature of those societies". Kocka went on to criticize Nolte's view of the Holocaust as "a not altogether incomprehensible reaction to the prior threat of annihilation, as whose potential or real victims Hitler and the National Socialists allegedly were justified in seeing themselves". Kocka wrote that:

"The real causes of anti-Semitism in Germany are to be found neither in Russia nor the World Jewish Congress. And how can one, in light of the facts, interpret the National Socialist annihilation of the Jews as a somewhat logical, if premature, means of defense against the threats of annihilation coming from the Soviet Union, with which Germany had made a pact in 1939, and which it then subsequently attacked? Here the sober historical inquiry into real historical connections, into causes, and consequences, and about real motives and their conditions would suffice to protect the writer and the reader from abstruse speculative interpretations. Nolte fails to ask such questions. If a past "that is capable of being agreed on" can be gained by intellectual gymnastics of this sort, then we should renounce it."

In response to the geographical theories of Michael Stürmer, Kocka argued that "Geography is not destiny" Kocka wrote that both Switzerland and Poland are also "in the middle" but each has a completely different history.

== Awards ==
- 1992: Gottfried Wilhelm Leibniz Prize
- On 22 January 2000 Kocka received an honorary doctorate from the Faculty of History and Philosophy at Uppsala University, Sweden
- 2005: Bochumer Historikerpreis
- 2011: Holberg International Memorial Prize

== Select bibliography ==
- Kocka J., "Entrepreneurs and Management in German Industrialization," in The Cambridge Economic History of Europe, vol. 7, pt. 1, ed. P. Mathias and M. M. Postan ( Cambridge, England, 1978), 492–589, 709–27, 769–77. Originally published as Unternehmer in der deutschen Industrialisierung (Göttingen, 1975).
- Kocka J., White Collar Workers in America 1890–1940. A Social Political History in International Perspective (London-Beverly Hills: SAGE, 1980).
- Kocka J., "Capitalism and Bureaucracy in German Industrialization before 1914," Economic History Review, 2nd series, 33 (1981): 453–468.
- Kocka J., "Class Formation, Interest Articulation and Public Policy: the Origins of the German White Collar Class in the Late Nineteenth and Early Twentieth Centuries," in Organizing Interests in Western Europe: pluralism, corporatism, and the transformation of politics, ed. S. Berger (Cambridge, England, 1988), 63–81.
- Kocka J., "Problems of Working-Class Formation in Germany: The Early Years, 1800–1875," in Working-Class Formation. Nineteenth- Century Patterns in Western Europe and the United States
- Kocka, Jürgen & A. Mitchell, eds. (1993). Bourgeois Society in Nineteenth-century Europe.
- Kocka J., and A. Mitchell, eds., Bourgeois Society in Nineteenth Century Europe ( Oxford, 1993).
- Kocka J., "New Trends in Labour Movement Historiography: A German Perspective," International Review of Social History 42 (1997): 67–78.
- Kocka J., "Asymmetrical Historical Comparison: the Case of the German 'Sonderweg'," History and Theory 38 (1999): 40–51.
- Kocka, Jürgen (1999). Industrial Culture and Bourgeois Society. Business, Labor, and Bureaucracy in Modern Germany. New York: Berghahn Books. Archived from the original on 26 October 2016 – via Questia.
- Kocka, Jürgen. "Civil Society: Some remarks on the career of a concept," in: E. Ben-Rafael, Y. Sternberg (eds.): Comparing Modernities, pp. 141–148.
- Kocka, Jurgen. "Losses, Gains and Opportunities: Social History Today," Journal of Social History, Volume 37, Number 1, Fall 2003, pp. 21–28 doi:10.1353/jsh.2003.0146
- Kocka, Jurgen. Capitalism. A Short History Princeton: Princeton University Press, 2016. online review
- Kocka, Jürgen, and Marcel van der Linden, eds. Capitalism: The Reemergence of a Historical Concept (London: Bloomsbury 2016) 281 pp.
- Kocka, Jürgen. "1989/91 as a Caesura in the Study of History: A Personal Retrospective." in Beyond Neoliberalism (Palgrave Macmillan, Cham, 2017) pp. 257–269 online.
- Kocka, Jürgen. "Capitalism and Its Critics. A Long-Term View." in The Lifework of a Labor Historian: Essays in Honor of Marcel van der Linden ed. by Ulbe Bosma and Karin Hofmeester (Brill, 2018) pp. 71–89. online
- Kocka, Jürgen. "Looking back on the Sonderweg." Central European History 51.1 (2018): 137–142. online

=== In German ===
- Kocka J., "Industrielles Management: Konzeptionen und Modelle in Deutschland vor 1914," Vierteljahrschrift für Sozial- und Wirtschaftsgeschichte 61 (1969): 332–72.
- Kocka J., Unternehmensverwaltung und Angestelltenschaft am Beispiel Siemens 1847–1914. Zum Verhältnis von Kapitalismus und Bürokratie in der deutschen Industrialisierung (Stuttgart, 1969).
- Kocka J., "Sozialgeschichte – Strukturgeschichte – Gesellschaftsgeschichte," Archiv für Sozialgeschichte 15 (1975): 1–42.
- Kocka J., Klassengesellschaft im Krieg. Deutsche Sozialgeschichte 1914–1918 [ Facing Total War. German Society 1914–1918 (2nd ed., Göttingen, 1978).
- Kocka J., et al., Familie und soziale Plazierung (Opladen, 1980).
- Kocka J., Die Angestellten in der deutschen Geschichte 1850–1980: Vom Privatbeamten zum angestellten Arbeitnehmer (Göttingen, 1981).
- Kocka J., ed., Arbeiter und Bürger im 19. Jahrhundert. Varianten ihres Verhältnisses im europäischen Vergleich (Munich, 1986).
- Kocka J., Arbeitsverhältnisse und Arbeiterexistenzen. Grundlagen der Klassenbildung im 19. Jahrhundert (Bonn, 1990).
- Kocka J., Weder Stand noch Klasse. Unterschichten um 1800 (Bonn, 1990).
- Kocka J., ed., Bürger und Bürgerlichkeit im 19. Jahrhundert (Göttingen, 1987).
- Kocka J., and U. Frevert, eds., Bürgertum im 19. Jahrhundert. Deutschland im europäischen Vergleich, (3 vols. Munich, 1988); rev. ed.: Kocka J., ed., Bürgertum im 19. Jahrhundert, (3 vols. Göttingen, 1995).
