= Rohan Butler =

English historian and civil servant

Rohan D'Olier Butler (21 January 1917 - 30 October 1996) was an English historian and civil servant.

Butler worked on the multi-volume Documents on British Foreign Policy, 1919–1939. He was an editor (1945–54) under Sir Llewellyn Woodward, then senior editor (1955–65) of the project.

From 1963 to 1982 he was historical adviser to the Secretary of State for Foreign Affairs. Butler believed that historians could make a beneficial contribution to the formation of foreign policy, and he wrote extensively, especially on German and Russian issues. Sir Julian Bullard wrote that "there were few important British ministerial speeches in that period in which the argument was not strengthened and the text not embellished by a contribution from Rohan's distinctive pen".

He was the son of Sir Harold Butler.

== Works ==
- The Roots of National Socialism 1783–1933. London: Faber & Faber Ltd. 1941 – via Internet Archive.
- Choiseul: Father and Son, 1719–1754 (1980).
