= History of modernisation theory =

Aspect of historiography

Modernisation refers to a model of a progressive transition from a "pre-modern" or "traditional" to a "modern" society. The theory particularly focuses on the internal factors of a country while assuming that, with assistance, traditional or pre-modern countries can be brought to development in the same manner which more developed countries have. Modernisation theory attempts to identify the social variables that contribute to social progress and development of societies, and seeks to explain the process of social evolution. Modernisation theory is subject to criticism originating among socialists and free-market ideologies, world-systems theorists, globalisation theorists and dependency theorists among others. Modernisation theory not only stresses the process of change, but also the responses to that change. It also looks at internal dynamics while referring to social and cultural structures and the adaptation of new technologies.

== Earliest expressions of the theory ==
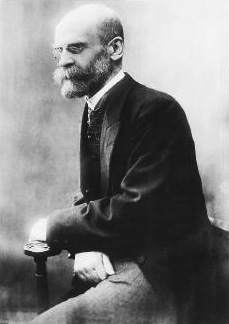
Émile Durkheim

The fundamental principles of modernisation theory can be derived from the Idea of Progress, which emerged in the 18th century Age of Enlightenment with the idea that people themselves could develop and change their society. Condorcet was the first person to make the connection between economic and social development and to suggest that there can be continuous progress and improvement in human affairs.

In addition to social structure and the evolution of societies, the French sociologist Émile Durkheim developed the concept of functionalism, which stresses the interdependence of the institutions of a society and their interaction in maintaining cultural and social unity.

Modernisation theory emerged further in the late 19th century and was especially popular among scholars in the mid-20th century. One notable advocate was Harvard sociologist Talcott Parsons whose Mandarins of the Future (2003) stressed the importance of societies remaining open to change and saw reactionary forces as restricting development. Maintaining tradition for tradition's sake was thought to be harmful to progress and development. Proponents of the modernisation theory can be split into two groups; optimists and pessimists. The optimist view describes that what some see as a setback for the theory (events such as the Iranian Revolution or the persistence of instability in the Democratic Republic of Congo) are invariably temporary setbacks on the road to progress. Contarary, the pessimist view believes that certain 'non-modern' areas of the world are incapable of becoming modern.

== Contributors ==
Significant academic contributors to the theory include W. W. Rostow, who in his The Stages of Economic Growth: A Non-Communist Manifesto (1960) concentrated on the economic system aspect of modernisation, attempting to show factors needed for a country to reach the path to modernisation in his Rostovian take-off model. David Apter concentrated on the political system and history of democracy, researching the connection between democracy, good governance and efficiency and modernisation. Seymour Martin Lipset in "Some Social Requisites of Democracy" (1959) argued that economic development sets off a series of profound social changes that together tend to produce democracy. David McClelland (The Achieving Society, 1967) approached this subject from the psychological perspective, with his motivations theory, arguing that modernisation cannot happen until a given society values innovation, striving for improvement and entrepreneurship. Alex Inkeles (Becoming Modern, 1974) similarly creates a model of modern personality, which needs to be independent, active, interested in public policies and cultural matters, open for new experiences, rational and being able to create long-term plans for the future. Edward Said's Orientalism (1978) interprets modernisation from the point of view of societies that are quickly and radically transformed.

== Case studies ==
=== United States ===
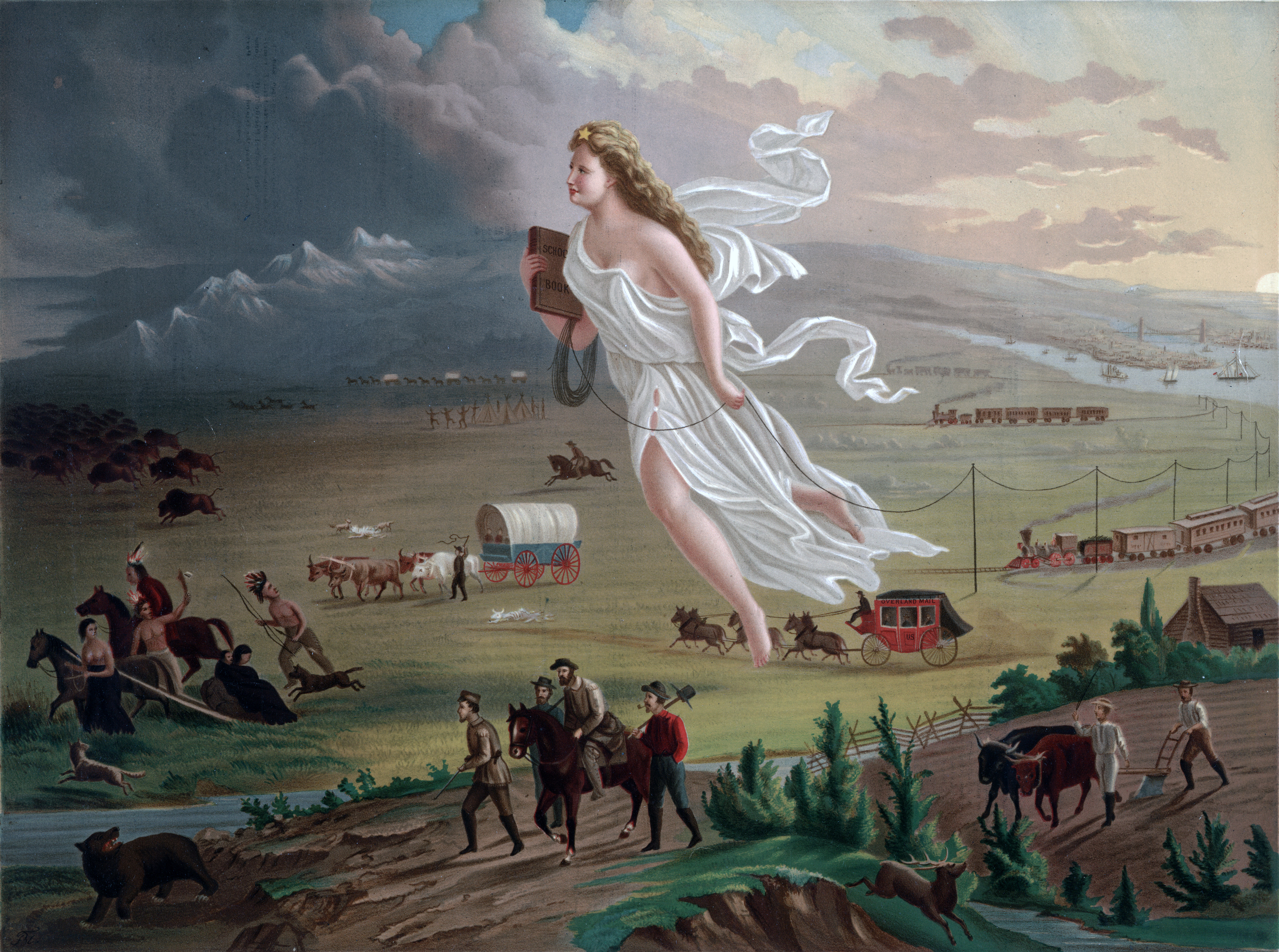
This painting (circa 1872) by John Gast called American Progress, is an allegorical representation of the modernisation of the new west. Here Columbia, a personification of the United States, leads civilisation westward with American settlers, stringing telegraph wire as she sweeps west; she holds a school book. The different stages of economic activity of the pioneers are highlighted and, especially, the changing forms of transportation. The Native Americans and wild animals flee.

The Progressives in the United States in the early 20th century upheld the modernist attitude. They believed in science, technology, expertise—and especially education—as the grand solution to society's weaknesses. Characteristics of progressivism included a favorable attitude toward urban-industrial society, belief in mankind's ability to improve the environment and conditions of life, belief in obligation to intervene in economic and social affairs, and a belief in the ability of experts and in efficiency of government intervention.

Paul Monroe, a professor of history at Columbia University, was a member of The Inquiry—a team of American experts at the Paris Peace Conference in 1919. He drew on his experience in the Philippines to assess the educational needs of developing areas such as Albania, Turkey and Central Africa. Monroe believed and presented educational development as instrumental to nation-building and socioeconomic development. Monroe recommended the implementation of a progressive curriculum - with an emphasis on practical, adult, and teacher training - in a national system of education, as a basis for self-development, except in Africa. His approach shaped American cooperation with developing countries in the 1920s and modernisation efforts during the 1920s-1930s.

=== Germany's "Sonderweg" ===
Historians Kocka (1988) and Sheri Berman emphasised the central importance of a German Sonderweg ("special path") or "exceptionalism" as the root of Nazism and the German catastrophe in the 20th century. Fritz Fischer and his students emphasised Germany's primary guilt for causing World War I.

Hans-Ulrich Wehler, a leader of the Bielefeld School of social history, credited the origins of Germany's path to disaster in the 1860s-1870s to mere economic modernisation without similar political modernisation and thus old Prussian rural elite remained in firm control of the army, diplomacy and the civil service. Traditional, aristocratic, premodern society battled an emerging capitalist & bourgeois modern society. Recognising the importance of modernising forces in industry, economy and in the cultural realm, Wehler argued much of political sphere in Germanly still upheld pre-modern traditional values, as well as social mentalities and in class relations (Klassenhabitus). The catastrophic German politics between 1914 and 1945 are interpreted in terms of a delayed modernisation of its political structures. At the core of Wehler's interpretation is his treatment of "the middle class" and "revolution," each of which was instrumental in shaping the 20th century. Wehler's examination of Nazi rule is shaped by his concept of "charismatic domination," which focuses heavily on Adolf Hitler.

The historiographical concept of a German Sonderweg has had a turbulent history. Scholars of the 19th century who emphasised a separate German path to modernity saw it as a positive factor that differentiated Germany from the "western path" typified by Great Britain. The stressed the strong bureaucratic state, reforms initiated by Bismarck and other strong leaders, the Prussian service ethos, the high culture of philosophy and music, and Germany's pioneering of a social welfare state. In the 1950s, historians in West Germany argued that the Sonderweg led Germany to the disaster of 1933–1945. The special circumstances of German historical structures and experiences, were interpreted as preconditions that, while not directly causing National Socialism, did hamper the development of a liberal democracy and facilitate the rise of fascism. The Sonderweg paradigm has provided the impetus for at least three strands of research in German historiography: the long 19th century, the history of the bourgeoisie, and comparisons with the West. After 1990, increased attention to cultural dimensions and to comparative and relational history moved German historiography to different topics, with much less attention paid to the Sonderweg. While some historians have abandoned the Sonderweg thesis, they have not provided a generally accepted alternative interpretation.

=== 19th-century France ===
In his seminal book Peasants Into Frenchmen: The Modernisation of Rural France, 1880–1914 (1976), historian Eugen Weber traced the modernisation of French villages and argued that rural France went from backward and isolated to modern and possessing a sense of French nationhood during the late 19th and early 20th centuries. He emphasised the roles of railroads, republican schools, and universal military conscription. He based his findings on school records, migration patterns, military service documents and economic trends. Weber argued that until 1900 or so a sense of French nationhood was weak in the provinces. Weber then looked at how the policies of the Third Republic created a sense of French nationality in rural areas. The book was widely praised, but was criticised by some who argued that a sense of Frenchness existed in the provinces before 1870.

==== Greece ====
The modernising force of the post-civil war Greek society came primarily as a result of the European and US geopolitical strategy for the region of eastern Mediterranean. Greece ought to be a modern capitalistic state to counter the proximity of several eastern and third world bloc countries and the strong national communist movement. According to Truman Doctrine and with the support of local elites, a great economical leap forward took place along with the severe repression that led to the 1967 coup d'état. This dramatic change covered the long-standing cultural divide of greek academia, comparing modern and neo-greek to ancient and traditional identities. Music, art and cinema, influenced by the pioneers of American and European tendencies thrived, until the milestone of 1967, in contrast to the authoritarian and traditionalist military and paramilitary structures. This dimension is vital as it reveals the process of modernisation under the western directives in all social levels that came in fact in opposition to the political directives of the same source.

=== Asia ===
Many studies of modernisation have focused on the history of Japan in the late 19th century, and China and India in the late 20th century. For example, the process of borrowing science and technology from the West has been explored.

==== China ====
Mao modernised the People's Republic of China with massive industrialisation projects and social transformation. However, China did not become a democratic country after its modernisation. Nowadays, even though the Soviet-style authoritarian regimes have already collapsed worldwide, China did not have any major political reforms after Mao's death. The country remained authoritarian, despite the size of its economic sector.

China has been attempting to modernise ever since the Revolution of 1911 and the end of the Qing Dynasty, the last dynasty of China. Before the Qing Dynasty was overthrown, it attempted to reform from 1902 to 1908 to save itself and instigated reforms in infrastructure, transportation, and government. These reforms were based on Western models and even included aspects of democracy, which are often associated with the process of modernisation. However, these reforms were largely unsuccessful and resulted in the Revolution of 1911. Following the Revolution of 1911, other movements such as the May 4th Movement of 1919 advocated for modernisation, iconoclasm, and a rejection of foreign influence and imperialism. From the beginning of the 20th century until the establishment of the People's Republic of China in 1949, China has been delayed in efforts to modernise due to an era of warlordism, the Second Sino-Japanese War, and civil war between the CCP and KMT.

When the communist party came to power in 1949, Mao Zedong used the Soviet Union as China's example for modernisation. The Great Leap Forward from 1958 to 1961 was Mao's version of the Soviet Union's Five year Plan, and its goals were to create a modern communist society through industrialisation and collectivisation. Mao Zedong aimed to become a world power without foreign, mainly western, involvement, ideas, or capitalism and preached the idea of self-reliance. Mao did contribute to the modernisation of China, however The Great Leap Forward is regarded as a failure and the Cultural Revolution from 1966 to 1976 was detrimental to China's industrialisation progress.

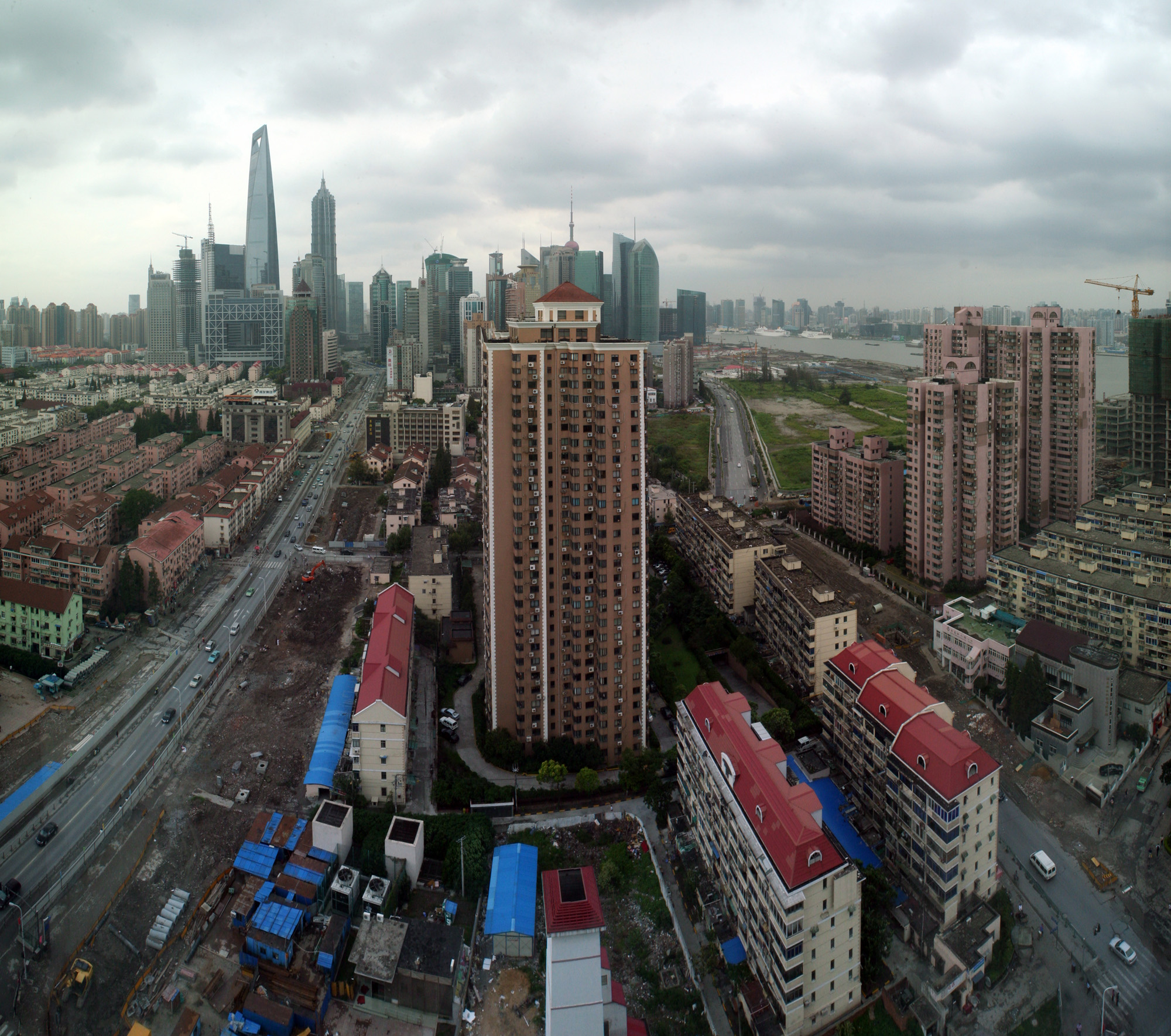
The Modern Chinese City of Shanghai

However, during Mao's era, he transformed China from a predominantly agrarian country to an industrialised power. In the 1970s, China was able to produce most of commodities and goods by its own industry. Mao laid the foundation for China's economic development in Deng's era.

The economic reforms of Chinese Supreme Leader Deng Xiaoping are attributed to China's economic success in the 21st century. Deng focused on four modernisations: agriculture, industry, national defense, and science and technology. The West was used as an example for several of these modernisations, however their management was completely Chinese. Deng began de-collectivisation and allowed Township and Village Enterprises (TVE), Special Economic Zones (SEZ), foreign investment, profit incentive, and even privatisation.

While Mao advocated self-reliance, Deng generated foreign exchange to finance modernisation. His famous quote is, "It doesn’t matter whether a cat is white or black, as long as it catches mice." Post Deng Reforms continued on this path, which is acknowledged as a shift from the iron rice bowl to the porcelain rice bowl, or government owned to privatised. Although China's economy has shifted towards privatisation and capitalism, the PRC remains an authoritative regime, which is contradictory in comparison to other examples of countries that have modernised. Democracy is the political characteristic that has defined modernised nations in the past and the modernisation theory suggests democracy follows with the development of a modernised state. China was late in modernisation and has thus had many other countries as examples to base its model of modernisation off of.

The One-Child Policy has also been a technique to contribute or even force the modernisation of China. Instigated in 1978, the one-child policy has created a generation known as "singletons" or "little emperors" (xiao huangdi 小皇帝). "The Chinese state enforced a rapid fertility transition designed to cultivate a generation of "high-quality" people with resources and ambition to join the global elite." These little emperors are expected to compete with the first-world countries having no siblings to compete with for parental investment. Normally with modernisation and urbanisation smaller or nuclear families evolve as the result. China has switched this logic, hoping that creating the culture of the nuclear family with the one-child policy it will produce modernisation.

At the beginning of the 21st century, China is still in the process of modernisation. In 2010 it had the third greatest GDP and GDP (PPP) in the world with the world's largest labour force, and is acknowledged as the world's second largest economy. In 2010 its economy was still increasing in growth at 10.3%. China has also successfully joined the largely Western international arena with its membership of the UN in 1971, the WTO in 2001, and hosted the Olympics in 2008. China's goal is to continue modernising until it joins the first-world and becomes the core instead of the semi-periphery or periphery, from the core-periphery model.

The modernisation of China through urbanisation, industrialisation, and economic policy has benefited the country economically as it rises as a world power in the 21st century. However it now is experiencing the problems associated the other modern countries and capitalism. These problems include the growing disparity between the rich and poor, urban vs. rural and migration, and ecological issues.

==== South Korea ====
Modernisers in South Korea in the late 19th century were torn between the American and the Japanese models. Most of the Koreans involved were educated Christians who saw America as their ideal model of civilisation. However, most used Japan as a practical model - as an example of how a fellow East Asian country, which 30 years before was also backward, could succeed in modernising itself. At the same time, reformists' nationalist reaction against the domineering, colonial behaviour of the Japanese in Korea often took the form of an appeal to international (Western) standards of civilisation. The Western-oriented worldview of the early Christian nationalist reformers was complex, multilayered, and often self-contradictory - with 'oppressive' features not easily distinguishable from 'liberational' ones. Their idealised image of the West as the only true, ideal civilisation relegated much of Korea's traditional culture to a position of 'oriental'.

The self-image of Koreans was formed through complex relationships with modernity, colonialism, Christianity, and nationalism. This formation was initiated by a change in the notion of 'civilisation' due to the transformation of 'international society' and thereafter was affected by the trauma of Japanese colonisation. Through the process of transition from a traditional Confucian notion of civilisation to a Western notion of acceptance and resistance, Koreans shaped their civilisation as well as their notions of the racial, cultural, and individual modern self. Western Orientalism, in particular, accompanied the introduction of the Western notion of civilisation, which served as the background for forming the self-identity of Koreans. The fact that the Japanese version of Orientalism emerged from the domination of Korea by Japan played a critical role in shaping the self-identity of Koreans. Consequently, Korea still maintains an inferiority complex toward Western culture, ambivalent feelings toward Japanese culture, and biased - positive or negative - views of their own cultural traditions. Thus both modernisation and colonisation have shaped the formation or distortion of self-consciousness of non-Western peoples.

The US launched a decades-long intensive development starting in 1945 to modernise South Korea, with the goal of helping it become a model nation-state and an economic success. Agents of modernisation at work in Korea included the US Army, the Economic Cooperation Administration, the UN Korean Reconstruction Agency, and a number of nongovernmental organisations, among them the Presbyterian Church, the YMCA, Boy Scouts and the Ford Foundation. Many Koreans migrated to California and Hawaii, and brought back firsthand accounts of modern business and governmental practices that they sought to adapt to Korean conditions.

==== Japan ====
Modernisation theory was generally supported by American scholars and opposed by Japanese Marxists. After industrialisation and economic modernisation, a democratic society did appear in Japan, but was followed in the 1930s by an aggressive authoritarian fascist state, up until the Allied Forces defeated Japan in the Second World War after which it became and since remained a democratic state. There were almost no democratic principles or practices in pre-war Japanese politics. Prior to the liberation of Japan by the United States from its military government, the Japanese always honoured obedience and hierarchy, while despising individualism and liberty.

Japan had already modernised and became an industrialised country during its Meiji period, which happened long before Japan's defeat in the Second World War. Japan was the first country in Asia that industrialised successfully. It quickly became one of the imperialist and colonial powers. Japan defeated the Qing dynasty of China in 1894, and subsequently defeated Russia in 1905. Korea and Taiwan were annexed by the Japanese Empire. When Japan invaded China in 1931, it had already finished its industrialising process and had enough industrial power to wage a war itself. Japan's navy was among the world's most advanced navies.

The democratic performance of Japan after the Second War was promoted by the U.S. and welcomed by a great majority.

Japan rapidly went through numerous changes concerning modernisation after their defeat. This happened starting with United States quickly intervening with Japan internally. American demilitarisation and democratisation was accepted by the people of Japan without strong resistance.

Under the occupation of United States, SCAP (Supreme Commander for the Allied Powers) was established, which was an institution in charge of formulating policies. The goal of SCAP was to dissolve the army and navy, and also to punish responsible leaders, and it established the New constitution of 1946. SCAP could not function without the assistance of Japanese government because the language barrier was too high. However, this actually helped make bigger changes in creating demilitarisation and democratisation. SCAP helped people to gain freedoms of speech, press, and the right to organise labour or farmer unions.

As such, the new constitution created by SCAP granted civil and political rights to the people; consequently, leading to modernisation. It also allowed freedom of speech and association, right to organise labour association and movements, or create unions; and implemented grounds for civil rights for women.

The government held a pivotal role in modernising Japan. Japan concentrated on their industry and technology to achieve growth for which the state gave assistances to several industries and adopted protectionism policies. The government served as a lender, as facilitator of access to foreign exchange, raw materials, or technology licenses, and as rescuer when problems arise. To illustrate, the most important guiding agency was the Ministry of International Trade and Industry. In addition, through the 1960s, Japanese government used economic policies such as tariffs to obstruct imports and protect Japanese firms from foreign competitors in its domestic market in order to become a modernised country.

==== Turkey ====
Turkey, under Kemal Atatürk in the 1920s and 1930s, engaged in a systematic modernisation programme called "Kemalism". Hundreds of European scholars came to help. Together with Turkish intellectuals they developed a successful model of development.

=== Latin America ===
Since independence, modernisation has been a driving force for Chile's political elites. Ree (2007) analyses projects of modernisation that have been implemented from above since 1964. Despite their ideological differences and varying understanding of modernity, these projects shared key characteristics in their construction and implementation, such as the use of developmental theories, their state-orientation, the prominent role of technocrats and state-planning, and the capacity of adaptation in sight of civil unrest. These projects have produced patterns of modernity that have proven particularly stable.

=== Africa ===
Modernisation has been attributed with creating positive development around the world, but in the modern era, specifically in Africa, the perception of modernisation theory has changed. The application of western modernisation in Africa is recognised as something beneficial to non-western African countries. Modernisation theory, where instituted, is often regarded with exploiting domestic processes of non-western nations under colonial rule.

Modernisation has led to problems in Nigeria by bringing in private, foreign owned oil companies that have been exploiting the natural resource wealth of the country. Since the oil companies are generally owned by a different nation, the profits are exported from Nigeria with only one fifteenth of the wealth produced in the region returning to it. While profits from Shell, an oil company operating in Ogoniland, Nigeria has helped the country develop and industrialise on a small scale, it has also challenged the sovereignty and autonomy of Nigeria.

Prominent scholars view modernisation essentially as westernisation where western institutions are brought into existing cultures where their application is unnecessary. Along with modernisation comes a loss of culture and society, and the individual is strengthened. An African tribe known as the Ik was forced to change their habits due to modernisation and the creation of individual countries caused by colonialism. Nationalisation, as a tool of modernisation, was imparted on Africa by colonialists who wanted to westernise and modernise tribal Africa. The creation of individual countries made life for the tribal Ik more difficult because they were forced out of their nomadic lifestyle into a settlement based around a newly founded national park that practically destroyed their livelihood by restricting their hunting grounds to specific non-park areas. The creation of national parks have increased cultivation, which can be seen as good development because people no longer depend solely on livestock. This creation of a new sort of livelihood has mixed improvements, because the tribal setting is not removed, but is put into a single place.
