= View of the World from 9th Avenue =

Illustration by Saul Steinberg

- Saul Steinberg's March 29, 1976 View of the World from Ninth Avenue cover of The New Yorker
- Artist: Saul Steinberg
- Year: 1976
- Type: Ink, pencil, colored pencil, and watercolor on paper
- Dimensions: 28 by 19 inches (71 cm × 48 cm)
- Location: Private collection

View of the World from 9th Avenue (sometimes A Parochial New Yorker's View of the World, A New Yorker's View of the World or simply View of the World) is a 1976 illustration by Saul Steinberg that served as the cover of the March 29, 1976, edition of The New Yorker. The work presents the view from Manhattan of the rest of the world showing Manhattan as the center of the world. The work of art is an artistic representation of distorted self-importance relative to one's true place in the world that is a form of perception-based cartography humor.

View of the World has been parodied by Columbia Pictures, The Economist, Mad, and The New Yorker itself, among others. The parodies all reassign the distorted self-importance to a new subject as a satire. The work has been imitated and printed without authorization in a variety of ways. The film poster for Moscow on the Hudson led to a ruling by the United States District Court for the Southern District of New York in Steinberg v. Columbia Pictures Industries, Inc. in favor of Steinberg because of copyright violations by Columbia Pictures.

The illustration was regarded in 2005 as one of the greatest magazine covers of the prior 40 years, and is known as the most famous The New Yorker cover as well as Steinberg's most famous work. Similarly themed perception-based cartoons had preceded Steinberg, notably a pair by John T. McCutcheon were published on the front page of the Chicago Tribune in the early 20th century. The 1922 McCutcheon work is regarded as an inspiration for this work. This type of humor descends from Manifest Destiny-themed artwork.

== Background ==
Saul Steinberg was born in Romania, received architecture training in Italy and fled the Holocaust to settle in New York City in 1942. He created 85 covers and 642 internal drawings and illustrations for The New Yorker, including its March 29, 1976, cover, titled "View of the World from 9th Avenue". His works are considered to be on the bridge between modernism and postmodernism. He was best known for his work at The New Yorker.

It is regarded as The New Yorker's most famous cover. It is regarded as his most famous work and is considered an example of unintentional fame: Steinberg has noted that the type of fame that resulted from the work has diminished his significance to "the man who did that poster". The work is sometimes referred to as A Parochial New Yorker's View of the World or A New Yorker's View of the World because it depicts a map of the world as seen by self-absorbed New Yorkers. At one point The New Yorker applied for a copyright from the United States Copyright Office for the work. It assigned the copyright to Steinberg and subsequently reproduced posters of the painting. Among Steinberg's other works are precursors and derivatives of this work.

== Inspiration ==
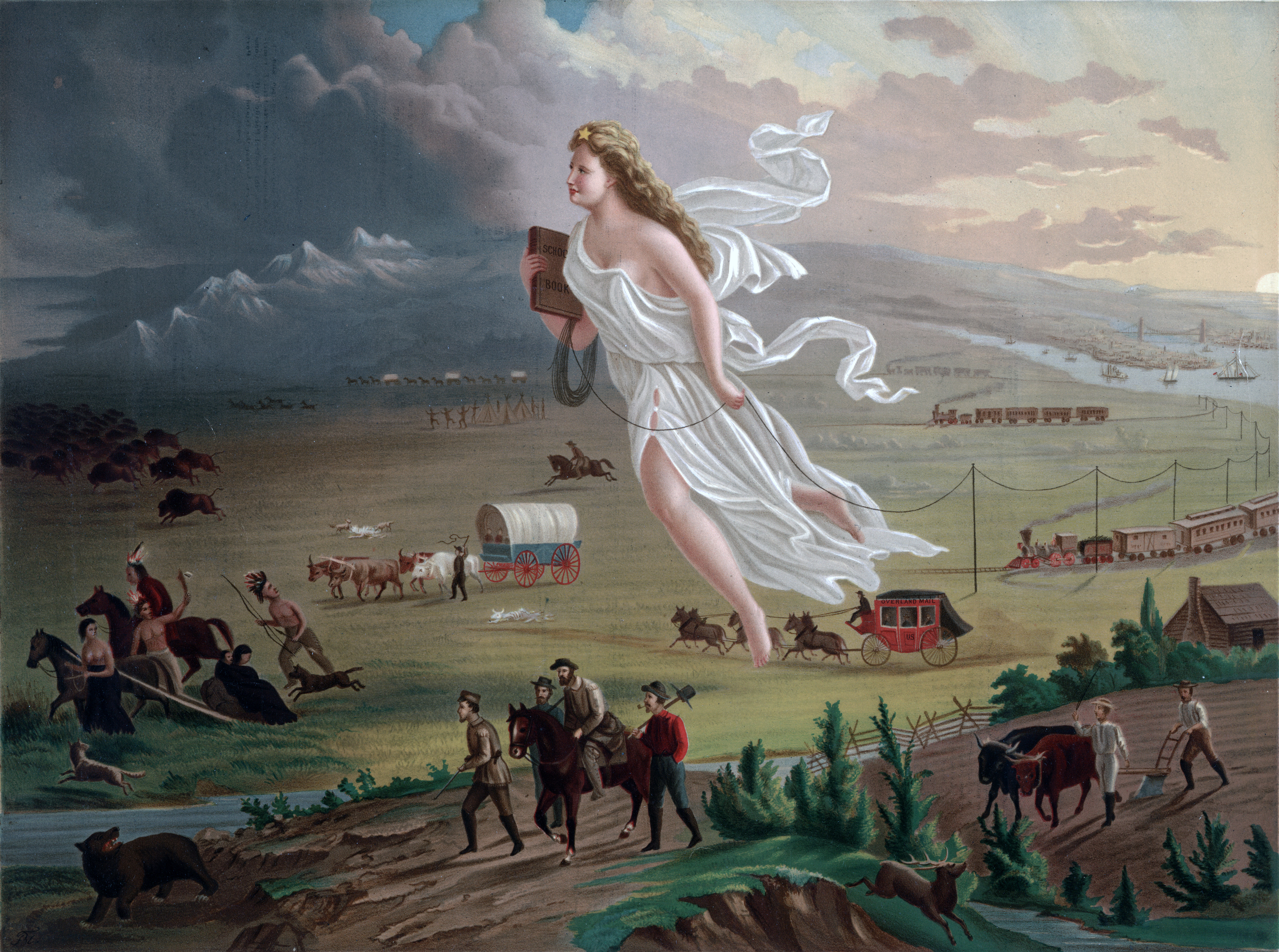
American Progress by John Gast, 1872

Seminal comparable depictions of geographic compression of the United States can be found in early American landscape art embodiment of the Manifest destiny cultural belief. Typical representations of the East depict cultural sophistication from the 19th century perspective, while representations of the West show a landscape anticipating redevelopment for municipal progress. The 1872 painting, American Progress, by John Gast however depicted the illuminated eastern port cities beaming light westward with telegraph wires and the transportation of the day (covered wagon, stagecoach, and train) connecting to the as yet unlit West with foreboding clouds towards which Native Americans and bison are pushed out of the scene. The whole scene is under the flight of a Liberty Goddess.

John T. McCutcheon perception-based cartography humor

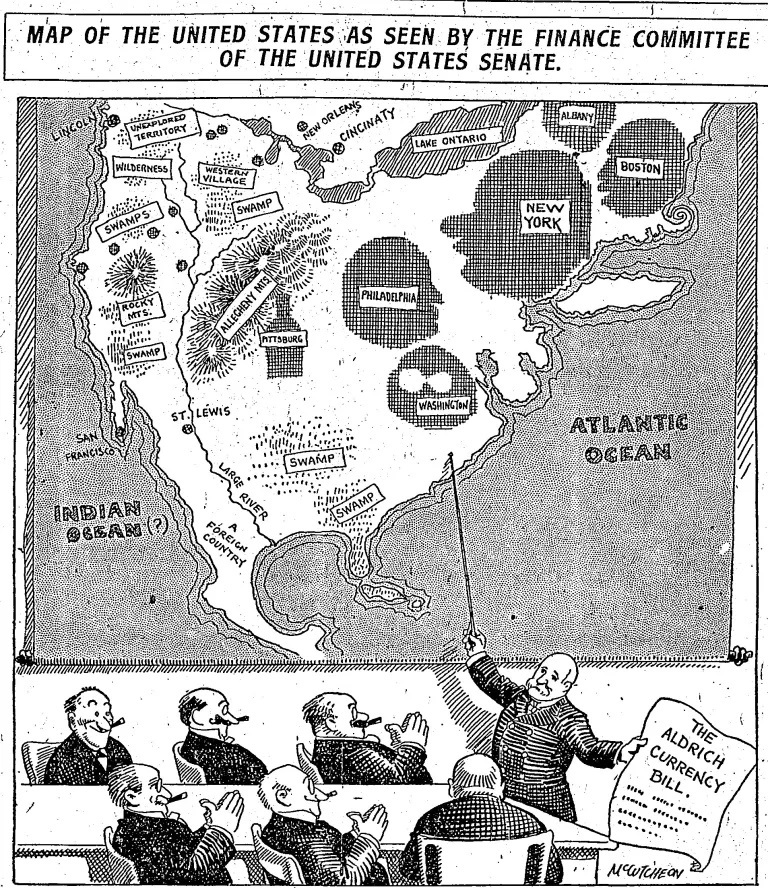
January 16, 1908 Chicago Tribune front page cartoon

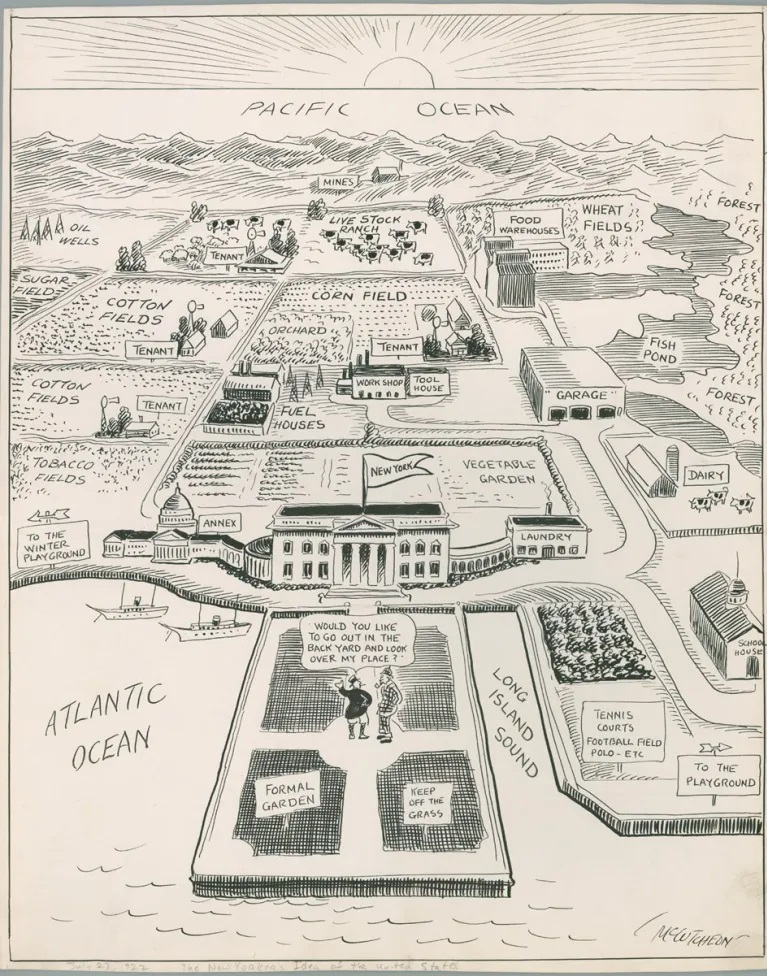
July 27, 1922 Chicago Tribune front page cartoon

Two prominent perception-based cartography cartoons that preceded Steinberg's and are in the public domain. The 1922 cartoon shows similar satirical "exaggerated regional chauvinism" of New Yorkers.

The New York Times geography editor, Tim Wallace, notes that perception-based map humor has existed since at least a January 16, 1908 Chicago Tribune front page cartoon by John T. McCutcheon, titled "Map of the United States as seen by the Finance Committee of the United States Senate". That cartoon depicts big eastern cities (Washington, DC, Philadelphia, New York City, Boston, and Albany, New York) as the main focus of bald, old, cigar-smoking white men in the United States Senate as they temporarily resolved the Panic of 1907 with the Aldrich-Vreeland Act until they could work out the Federal Reserve Act a few years later. It shows Chicago's location near a depiction of Lake Michigan as a "western village", which may be a midwestern dig at Congressional attention focused on the East Coast of the United States.

Various authors state that McCutcheon presaged Steinberg with his July 27, 1922 Chicago Tribune front page cartoon titled "The New Yorker’s Map of the United States", The prototypical New Yorker is depicted dressed like Mr. Monopoly or British aristocracy in tweed clothing and a deerstalker hat. By playing host in the work, he invites the audience to observe from his viewpoint. In McCutcheon's work, the rest of America is New York City's backyard including Detroit (the home of the automobile industry) depicted as the garage and Chicago (with Union Stock Yards) as the food warehouses both situated correctly along the Great Lakes that are presented as a fish pond.

New England is his schoolhouse and farmers are his "tenants". Washington is depicted as an ancillary wing to the building that represents New York City, while livestock ranches symbolize the West, mines symbolize California and oil wells symbolize Texas, all showing that the rest of America exists for the benefit of New York, which likely inspired Daniel Wallingford. Of the various New Yorker satirizations, this map, with its sharp criticism, is perceived to have the most socio-political commentary.

"The New Yorker’s Map of the United States" is falsely titled in a digital edition of the Chicago Tribune article as "The New Yorker’s Idea of the United States," which is a separate 1930s perception-based humor map by Wallingford. In Wallingford's parody, which he self-published in 1932, and which was professionally published by Columbia University Press in 1936, Minneapolis and Indianapolis are depicted as the Twin Cities. It depicts Manhattan and Brooklyn both on a scale larger than most states and portrays Wilmington, Delaware as if it is in the West. Wallingford's map, which makes a similar statement to Steinberg's, is presented in a style that evokes memories of early European exploration maps. Although originally a black-and-white work, it is now produced with colorization. It was republished several times with some sources showing 1937 and 1939 publication dates.

In 2015, Bloomberg News presented another stereotypical self-centered view of New York City from 1970 that depicts Manhattan as 80% of the world and the other four boroughs as another 10%. The South is reduced to references to Texas, Miami and Washington DC. It eliminates the Midwest by melding New Jersey with the West Coast, and presents only trivial foreign depictions. The authorship of this rendition is anonymous.

Steinberg most likely was inspired by McCutcheon's 1922 map although people commonly trace it back to Wallingford. Even someone expert enough to be a senior geography editor for The New York Times thought Wallingford was the inspiration until he stumbled upon McCutcheon.

== Detail ==
The illustration is split in two parts, with the bottom half of the image showing Manhattan's Ninth Avenue, Tenth Avenue, and the Hudson River (appropriately labeled), and the top half depicting the rest of the world. It is a westward view from Ninth Avenue. Buildings along Ninth Avenue are shown in detail, with those between Ninth Avenue and the river also shown but in less detail; individual cars and trucks are drawn along the streets, and pedestrians are drawn along the sidewalks.

The rest of the United States is the size of the three New York City blocks and is drawn as a rectangle bounded by North American neighbors Canada and Mexico, with a thin brown strip along the Hudson representing "Jersey", the names of five cities (Los Angeles; Washington, D.C.; Las Vegas; Kansas City; and Chicago) and three states (Texas, Utah, and Nebraska) scattered among a few rocks for the United States beyond New Jersey, which is in bolder font than the rest of the country beyond the Hudson. Washington, D.C. is depicted as a remote location near Mexico.

The Pacific Ocean, slightly wider than the Hudson, separates the United States from three flattened land masses labeled China, Japan and Russia. The image depicts the world with a back turned to Europe. Everything beyond the Hudson River is shown without significant distinguishing characteristics. The description by The New Yorker publisher Condé Nast was "A birds eye view from 9th Avenue, showing an abbreviated landscape for the rest of the country and everything beyond Manhattan and the Hudson River."

According to the Saul Steinberg Foundation, View of the World from 9th Avenue is a 1976 work composed in ink, pencil, colored pencil, and watercolor on paper and measures 28 by 19 inches (71 cm × 48 cm). According to an International Journal of Comic Art 2007 review of the exhibition that stopped at the Morgan Library and Museum, Smithsonian American Art Museum, Cincinnati Art Museum and Vassar College, the work is a 1975 wax crayon and graphite on paper composition.

When exhibiting this work along with alternate versions and sketches, the University of Pennsylvania summarized the work as a "bird's-eye view of the city from Ninth Avenue in a straight line westward, with space becoming ever more condensed..." They also described the work as a tongue-in-cheek view of the world. New York interpreted the New York-centric mind's view of the rest of the world as a set of outer boroughs as iconic.

National Post journalist Robert Fulford described the perspective as one in which the entire world is a suburb of Manhattan. The theme that New York City is a cultural mecca that is "the centre of things" had pre-existed this work in various forms of media such as John Dos Passos' 1925 novel Manhattan Transfer, Leonard Bernstein's 1944 song "New York, New York" or Boogie Down Productions' subsequent hip hop song "South Bronx".

The work has become the quintessential example of overestimated or exaggerated self-importance. As such, it is cited as the referent for the topic in journals, especially the arrogance, or chauvinism of New Yorkers. The work is sometimes presented as an example of how one's perspective may trivialize a distant region that seems insignificant. The work is also considered the prominent example of the fact that a map is a subjective work with individual choice regarding the subject, orientation and perspective. The work also is a prime example of how a properly structured parody of a map can become a famous good joke despite its topological displacements. The work's presentation of distorted mental perception that everyplace else is superfluous is regarded as a "comic virtue".

== Parodies and derivatives ==
View of the World has been imitated without authorization in a variety of ways. The work has been imitated in postcard format by numerous municipalities, states and nations. Steinberg had stated that he could have retired on royalties from the many parodies made of the painting, had they been paid, a motivation for his eventual copyright lawsuit for the Moscow on the Hudson use. The illustration—humorously depicting New Yorkers' self-image of their place in the world, or perhaps outsiders' view of New Yorkers' self-image—inspired many similar works, including the poster for the 1984 film Moscow on the Hudson; that movie poster led to a lawsuit, Steinberg v. Columbia Pictures Industries, Inc., 663 F. Supp. 706 (S.D.N.Y. 1987), which held that Columbia Pictures violated the copyright Steinberg held on his work.

Fulford, writing in 2005 in The National Post, noted that the metaphor of the world as a suburb of Manhattan was "understood and borrowed" by the whole world. Local artists, especially poster artists, presented similarly compelling depictions of their own provincial perceptions. Fulford demonstrated the prominence of this work by mentioning that a high school in suburban Ottawa made imitating View of the World an assignment in its graphic arts class. He also noted that the result of this assignment was a worldwide variety of global foci from which the students viewed the world.

According to Art on Paper, the December 12, 2001 "New Yorkistan" cover of The New Yorker by Maria Kalman and Rick Meyer which reorients and renames the neighborhoods and boroughs of New York City for humorous effect was an homage View of the World from 9th Avenue. The cover was later satirized by Barry Blitt for the cover of The New Yorker on October 6, 2008. The cover featured Sarah Palin looking out of her window seeing only Alaska, with Russia in the far background.

The March 21, 2009, The Economist included a story entitled "How China sees the World" that presents a parody that is also an homage to the original image, but depicting the viewpoint from Beijing's Chang'an Avenue instead of Manhattan. A caption above the illustration reads "Illustration by Jon Berkeley (with apologies to Steinberg and The New Yorker)". It accompanied an article that discussed the burgeoning Chinese economy at the time of Great Recession. The October 1, 2012, cover of Mad Magazine satirized the problems with the September release of Apple Inc.'s iOS 6 mobile operating system which included Apple Maps, a replacement for Google Maps. The work presents what View of the World might look like if one had relied upon the September 2012 version of Apple Maps to locate various landmarks. Other parodies have depicted the view from Massachusetts Route 128 technological corridor, Princeton University, Tel Aviv, Jerusalem, various European cities, and various other locations worldwide.

David Runciman has described Elon Musk as if this artwork depicts how his mind works claiming that Musk sees big Tesla, Inc. factories and only minor details between them and outer space. After the Democratic Party gained control of the US House and Senate in the 2026 United States midterm elections, The New York Times wrote that the election results "look a little like the famous map called View of the World From Ninth Avenue", given that the Democratic leaders of both chambers (Chuck Schumer in the Senate and Hakeem Jeffries in the House) hailed from New York.

== Reception ==
In October 2005, the American Society of Magazine Editors unveiled its list of the greatest 40 magazine covers of the prior 40 years and ranked View of the World from 9th Avenue in fourth place. The listing stated that the work "...has come to represent Manhattan's telescoped perception of the country beyond the Hudson River. The cartoon showed the supposed limited mental geography of Manhattanites." Chicago Tribune writer Steve Johnson describes the work as the best expression of "New Yorkers' maddeningly internalized sense of superiority about their place of residence". Even Chicago's Newberry Library considers Steinberg's satirization of pretentious New Yorkers to be the grandest presentation of the subject.

A 2011 scholarly review in View published by Library of American Landscape History, Inc. shows that while much is made of the New York City as focal point of this world view by critics who consider it facetious, the New York perspective of the rest of America is worth equal attention: significant places to the south (Washington, Texas and Los Angeles) all being adjacent to Mexico, no rivers except the Hudson River and essentially nothing worth distinguishing from the plains except for the plush development of Las Vegas, a few named places and some geological configurations. The work may be more about the viewer it depicts, who is a West Side, Manhattan rooftop or skyscraper window person who considers New York to be a cultural nexus, and the rest of the country to be a flyover country or a wasteland.
