= A View of the World =

A View of the World may refer to:

- View of the World from 9th Avenue, an iconic cartoon by Saul Steinberg
- A View of the World, selected travel writings by Norman Lewis
