= Moscow on the Hudson =

1984 American film by Paul Mazursky

- Theatrical release poster
- Directed by: Paul Mazursky
- Written by: Paul Mazursky; Leon Capetanos
- Produced by: Paul Mazursky
- Starring: Robin Williams; María Conchita Alonso; Cleavant Derricks
- Cinematography: Donald M. McAlpine
- Edited by: Richard Halsey
- Music by: David McHugh
- Production company: Delphi Premier
- Distributed by: Columbia Pictures
- Release date: April 6, 1984 (US)
- Running time: 115 minutes
- Country: United States
- Languages: English; Russian
- Budget: $13 million
- Box office: $25,068,724

Moscow on the Hudson is a 1984 American comedy-drama movie with a romance subplot. It was written and directed by Paul Mazursky. Moscow on the Hudson was released by Columbia Pictures on April 6, 1984.

The movie stars Robin Williams as Vladimir Ivanov, a Soviet circus musician who defects while on a visit to the United States. It co-stars María Conchita Alonso (as Lucia Lombardo, a love interest of Ivanov's) in her first film role, and Cleavant Derricks (as Lionel Witherspoon, a Bloomingdale's security guard, and Ivanov's first American friend). Also featured are Elya Baskin (as the circus clown), Savely Kramarov (as one of two KGB apparatchiks), and Alejandro Rey (as Ivanov's immigration attorney).

The film received positive reviews from critics and grossed $25,068,724 against a $13 million budget.

== Plot ==
Vladimir Ivanov, a saxophonist with the Moscow circus, lives in a crowded apartment with his extended family. In the grim living conditions and lack of personal freedom in the Soviet Union, he stands in lines for hours to buy toilet paper and a pair of shoes.

When Boris, the apparatchik assigned to the circus, criticizes Vladimir for being late to rehearsal, and warns him that he may miss the approaching trip to New York City, Vladimir gives Boris a pair of shoes from the queue that made Vladimir late.

While Ivanov is riding in his friend Anatoly's Lada, Anatoly stops to buy fuel for his car from a mobile black-market gasoline dealer. While the friends wait for the gasoline seller to fill Anatoly's jerrycans, the two practice their English.

The circus troupe is sent to perform in New York City.

Anatoly, who has talked of little else but defecting, cannot bring himself to go through with it; Vladimir, who had opposed the scheme as reckless and foolhardy, suddenly decides to do it while at Bloomingdale's, shopping for blue jeans. He runs from his Soviet controllers and hides behind a perfume counter at the Bloomingdale's under the skirt of the clerk, Lucia Lombard.

When the NYPD and the FBI arrive, Vladimir stands up to his controllers and defects with news cameras rolling. Vladimir is left with nothing but the clothes on his back, the money in his pocket, and the pair of blue jeans that he had planned to buy for his girlfriend in Moscow.

Lionel Witherspoon, a security guard who protected Vladimir from his Soviet handlers during the defection, takes him home to Harlem to live with Lionel's mother, unemployed father, sister, and grandfather—a living arrangement noticeably similar to Vladimir's family back in Moscow.

With the help of a sympathetic immigration attorney and Cuban emigrant, Orlando Ramirez, Vladimir soon adapts to life in the United States. Vladimir attempts to find work despite speaking little English and fearing the threat of his former KGB handlers.

Vladimir manages to find work as a busboy, McDonald's cashier, sidewalk merchant, and limousine driver; although these jobs enable Vladimir to eventually move into his own apartment, he begins to doubt that he will ever play saxophone professionally again.

Vladimir starts a relationship with Lucia, the Bloomingdale's clerk. At a party celebrating Lucia's becoming an American citizen (Lucia originally being an Italian citizen), Vladimir proposes marriage to her; she refuses and, after an argument, breaks up with him. Lionel decides to return to Alabama to be closer to his young son. More bad news comes in a letter from Vladimir's family that his grandfather has died.

Grieving, Vladimir goes to a Russian nightclub in New York to ease his mind. When he returns to his apartment building drunk, he is mugged by two youths. He reports the incident to the police with his attorney Orlando present; the two go to a diner, where Vladimir rants about his misfortunes. During a confrontation with a burly man who makes it known that he is also a Soviet defector, Vladimir comes to appreciate his good fortune of living in the United States.

Soon after, Lucia reunites with Vladimir, telling him that she is not ready for marriage, but would love to live with a fellow immigrant. Lionel moves back from Alabama, and he takes over Vladimir's job driving a limousine.

Vladimir encounters his former KGB handler, who is now a street vendor selling hotdogs. He admits that he had to flee the Soviet Union due to his failure to prevent Vladimir's defection, but has also come to appreciate New York City.

Vladimir soon gets a job in a nightclub, where he again plays the saxophone.

== Cast ==
- Robin Williams as Vladimir Ivanov
- María Conchita Alonso as Lucia Lombardo
- Cleavant Derricks as Lionel Witherspoon
- Alejandro Rey as Orlando Ramirez
- Elya Baskin as Anatoly Cherkasov
- Savely Kramarov as Boris
- Oleg Rudnik as Yuri
- Yakov Smirnoff as Lev

== Production ==
According to film director Paul Mazursky, the idea for the film came from Mazursky's grandfather, who emigrated from Ukraine, then part of the Russian Empire, nearly 80 years before. When developing the script, the director contacted the Russian immigrant community in New York City and made his first trip to the Soviet Union.

"Most Russians", noted the director at the time, "are just trying to survive. Yet, all Russians who leave their country leave behind something they treasure and love. It's a terrible conflict for them, so the act of bravery is overwhelming."

After considering many locations for the Moscow portion of the film, Mazursky settled on Munich, Germany, based on the flexibility that Bavaria Studios offered him, with full control over an authentic "Eastern European street".

Robin Williams learned to speak some of the Russian language for the film in a crash course, and he also learned to play the saxophone.

=== Lawsuit ===
The poster, depicting a bird's eye view of New York, with Moscow and the Soviet Union beyond, prompted a lawsuit by artist Saul Steinberg. Steinberg alleged that the movie poster infringed his copyright image, View of the World from 9th Avenue, he had created for the cover of a 1976 issue of The New Yorker. The district court agreed, and awarded summary judgment to Steinberg in Steinberg v. Columbia Pictures Industries, Inc., 663 F. Supp. 706 (S.D.N.Y. 1987).

== Reception ==
The film was moderately successful at the box office, bringing in $25 million in ticket sales.

On the review aggregator website Rotten Tomatoes, 74% of 77 critics' reviews are positive. The website's consensus reads: "With Robin Williams' affecting portrayal as a Russian immigrant at the center of its fish-out-of-water story, Moscow on the Hudson soars with an abundance of laughs and heart." On Metacritic, it has a score of 67%, based on 11 reviews.

Vincent Canby of The New York Times said that the film "isn't ill conceived; rather, it seems unfinished, not yet thought through." Canby considered the scene of Vladimir's defection inside of Bloomingdale's to be the film's funniest; a "tumultuous sequence, in which prissy floorwalkers, members of the Soviet secret police, the store's public-relations personnel, New York City policemen and Federal Bureau of Investigation agents all are working at cross purposes".

Pauline Kael of The New Yorker wrote that Moscow on the Hudson was "a wonderful comedy about a tragedy", and that the movie is "imaginative and mellow," it "displays Mazursky's distinctive funky lyricism at its best", although "the film's comic rhythm (though not its mood) falters in the last third".

For his role as Vladimir Ivanov, Robin Williams was nominated for a Golden Globe Award for Best Actor in a Motion Picture – Musical or Comedy at the 1985 42nd Golden Globes Awards.
