= Dolphin Encounters =

Dolphin facility

Dolphin Encounters - Blue Lagoon Island
- Interactive map of Dolphin Encounters - Blue Lagoon Island
- 25.099°N 77.2674°W
- Date opened: 1989
- Location: Nassau, Bahamas
- Website: www.dolphinencounters.com

Dolphin Encounters is a natural seawater dolphin facility located on Blue Lagoon Island, (Salt Cay), Nassau, Bahamas. The company started as a rescue facility in 1989. The beach scenes in the movie Splash were taped on Blue Lagoon Island and the facility houses Atlantic bottlenose dolphins and California sea lions. Dolphin Encounters is owned and operated by a local family. The facility has received a Cacique Award from the Bahamas Ministry of Tourism. In 2003, Dolphin Encounters and Project B.E.A.C.H. received the Cacique Award from the Bahamas Ministry of Tourism.

== History ==
Blue Lagoon Island, a private island previously known as Salt Cay, was used by pirates and privateers in the 19th century. From 1916 to 1979, the island was owned by John T. McCutcheon, an American political cartoonist and Pulitzer Prize winner. In October 1979, L.A. Meister became the 6th owner.

Dolphin Encounters began in Nassau, Bahamas when two dolphins from a closed aquarium were rescued and relocated to a large seawater habitat in Abaco, Bahamas. Soon after, six more dolphins were imported into the facility on Salt Cay. A few years later, the marine park on Blue Lagoon Island opened. In 1995, after a multimillion-dollar expansion, the operation was renamed Dolphin Encounters.

== Location and facilities ==
Dolphin Encounters is located on Blue Lagoon Island, 1 mile from Paradise Island and Nassau, Bahamas. The only way to access Dolphin Encounters is by boat. The island encompasses over 3 acres of natural saltwater habitat, research & educational center with classrooms, photo & video lab, gift shops, restaurant, and guest services.

Dolphin Encounters has waterproof wheelchairs for handicapped visitors to interact with dolphins.

== Hollywood connection ==
In 1996, Universal Studios used three Dolphin Encounter owned dolphins in the movie Flipper. Some of the dolphins also starred in the Mary Kate & Ashley Olsen adventure film, "Holiday in the Sun." A couple of the sea lions have starred as the lead in the movies "Andre" and "Slappy and the Stinkers." In 2013, Dolphin Encounters served as the location for Beyoncé's H&M promo video "Standing on the Sun."

== Professional affiliations ==
- Member of the International Marine Animal Trainers Association (I.M.A.T.A)
- Member of the Alliance of Marine Mammal Parks and Aquariums (A.M.M.P.A)
- Member of the Bahamas National Coastal Awareness Committee (NCAC)

== Educational programs ==
The facility offers education and marine conservation programs to local schools and underprivileged children.

== Interactive programs ==
The facility offers several interactive programs to the public as well as a Program Observation. Interactive programs include Dolphin Swim, Dolphin Encounter, Sea Lion Encounter, Stingray Swim, and Beach Day on Blue Lagoon Island.

== Non-profit ==
A non-profit element of the marine park called Project B.E.A.C.H (Bahamas Education Association for Cetacean Health) hosts and organizes the annual coastal cleanup event in the Bahamas, a worldwide volunteer effort led by Ocean Conservancy. The facility has participated in the Make-A-Wish Foundation program and research programs involving the dolphins and dolphins in the wild to help scientists learn more about marine mammals.

== Awards ==
In 2003, Dolphin Encounters and Project B.E.A.C.H were awarded the Cacique Award - the Bahamas Ministry of Tourism's highest honour for excellence in tourism.

In 2009, Dolphin Encounters on Blue Lagoon Island became the first member of the International Marine Animal Trainers’ Association (IMATA) to receive accreditation for their animal trainer program. In 2009, Dolphin Encounters earned re-accreditation for Excellence in Mammal Care by the Alliance of Marine Mammal Parks and Aquariums (AMMPA), an international association representing marine life parks, aquariums, zoos, research facilities, and professional organizations dedicated to the highest standards of care for marine mammals and to their conservation in the wild through public education, scientific study, and wildlife presentations.

== Marine mammals ==
=== Dolphins and sea lions ===
All of the dolphins at the facility are native to Bahamian waters. The original group of sea lions were displaced following Hurricane Katrina in Gulfport, Mississippi.
