= Steinberg v. Columbia Pictures Industries, Inc. =

1987 lawsuit

- Court: United States District Court for the Southern District of New York
- Full case name: Saul Steinberg v. Columbia Pictures Industries, Inc., et al.
- Decided: June 24, 1987
- Docket nos.: 84 Civ. 9208; 87 Civ. 1750
- Citation: 663 F. Supp. 706

Court membership
- Judge sitting: Louis L. Stanton

Steinberg v. Columbia Pictures Industries, Inc., 663 F. Supp. 706 (S.D.N.Y. 1987) was a federal case in which artist Saul Steinberg sued various parties involved with producing and promoting the 1984 movie Moscow on the Hudson, claiming that a promotional poster for the movie infringed his copyright in a magazine cover, View of the World from 9th Avenue, he had created for a 1976 issue of The New Yorker.

== Procedural posture ==
The case was heard in the Southern District of New York in front of Judge Louis L. Stanton. The defendants, including Columbia Pictures Industries, Inc., RCA Corporation, and several major newspapers, denied Steinberg's allegations of copyright infringement and asserted the affirmative defenses of (1) fair use as a parody, (2) estoppel, and (3) laches. Both parties moved for summary judgment.

== Outcome ==
The court granted summary judgment to Steinberg on the issue of copyright infringement, finding that the defendants failed to prove any of their defenses.

== The two images ==
The View of the World from 9th Avenue cover

Movie poster for Moscow on the Hudson

The subject of the controversy was a drawing by Steinberg known as View of the World from 9th Avenue or A Parochial New Yorker's View of the World. The drawing, which appeared on the cover of the March 29, 1976 issue of The New Yorker, depicts four city blocks of Manhattan in great detail, with the rest of the United States and the world sketched sparsely in the background. The horizon is marked by a red line, and a thin blue wash of color at the top denotes the sky. At the top is the name of the magazine, in its characteristic font.

The New Yorker registered the image with the United States Copyright Office and assigned the copyright to Steinberg. About three months later, the magazine made an agreement to print and sell posters of the image.

The Moscow on the Hudson poster featured the movie's lead actor Robin Williams and his two co-stars at the bottom of the frame, with a highly detailed depiction of four city blocks of Manhattan behind them. In the background is a blue stripe representing the Atlantic Ocean, three landmarks denoting cities in Europe, and a set of Russian-looking buildings labeled "Moscow". Again, the horizon is marked by a red line, and the sky by a thin blue wash of color. At the top is the name of the movie, in the same font used by The New Yorker. The poster image was published as an advertisement in many newspapers across the country.

== The issue of copying ==
The court states the rule for infringement as follows: "To succeed in a copyright infringement action, a plaintiff must prove ownership of the copyright and copying by the defendant." As there was no dispute over whether Steinberg owned a valid copyright in his image, the only issue to be decided was whether the defendants had copied the image when they created the movie poster.

To determine whether the defendants had copied the image, the court turned to circumstantial evidence of access and substantial similarities between the two works. The court found ample evidence of the defendants' access to the copyrighted work; indeed, the defendants admitted at trial that they had used Steinberg's poster as inspiration for their own. As to the question of "substantial similarity" between the two works, the court asked "whether an average lay observer would recognize the alleged copy as having been appropriated from the copyrighted work."

Although it acknowledged that the idea of drawing a world map "from an egocentrically myopic perspective" could not be copyrighted, the court nevertheless held that the defendants had gone far beyond copying merely the idea of the Steinberg poster and had in fact copied its expression. As examples, the court cited the angle, layout, and details of the four city blocks depicted; the use of color on the horizon and sky; the distinctive lettering used in both for place names as well as the title at the top; and the overall stylistic impression of the two works. The court rejected the argument that any similarity between the works involved unprotectable scènes à faire, or standard themes common to any depiction of New York.

== Defenses ==
The court held that the Moscow on the Hudson poster was not a parody because it was not meant to satirize the Steinberg image itself, but merely satirized the same concept of the parochial New Yorker that was parodied by Steinberg's work. Because the copyrighted work was not an object of the parody, the appropriation of the image was not fair use.

The defendants also argued that Steinberg was estopped from defending his copyright on the grounds that he had taken no action over a period of eight years to stop others from counterfeiting his posters and adapting his idea to other locations, and had not acted in response to newspaper ads promoting the movie. The court rejected this argument, holding that the defendants had not proved any of the elements of estoppel: (1) a representation in fact; (2) reasonable reliance thereon; and (3) injury or damage resulting from denial by the party making the representation. While the defendants argued that Steinberg had made a representation of his acquiescence to their use of his image in the movie poster by not complaining about the ads in the newspaper, the judge rejected this line of reasoning and noted that the defendants had continued to use the infringing advertisements even after becoming aware of Steinberg's objections. Further, there was no existing relationship between the parties that could give rise to estoppel.

Finally, the defendants claimed the affirmative defense of laches, asserting that Steinberg had waited over six months to complain to Columbia Pictures about the alleged infringement in order to increase his award in the eventual lawsuit. The court dismissed this allegation on the grounds that Steinberg had registered his complaint with the defendants within weeks of beginning their advertising campaign, and that a six-month delay between publication of the allegedly infringing work and instigation of a lawsuit was not sufficient to establish a claim of laches.

== Test for copyright infringement ==
The court states the test for copyright infringement as copying an item that is the subject of a valid copyright, making no mention of improper appropriation of protectable elements, or in fact any distinction between protectable and unprotectable elements of Steinberg's drawing. This is in contrast to the 2nd Circuit's prior opinion in Nichols v. Universal Pictures Corp., 45 F.2d 119 (1930), that infringement occurs only when there is copying and improper appropriation. The Nichols decision held that appropriation was not improper when the alleged infringer copied only unprotectable elements of the original work. Therefore, while it is appropriate to look at both protectable and unprotectable elements of a work to determine whether copying has occurred, only the protectable elements are relevant when it comes to determining improper appropriation.
