= Shaw McCutcheon =

American cartoonist (1921–2016)

Howard Shaw McCutcheon (October 11, 1921 – July 6, 2016) was an American editorial cartoonist.

== Early life and education ==
Howard Shaw McCutcheon was born in Chicago, Illinois, in October 1921 to Evelyn (Shaw) and John Tinney McCutcheon. Shaw's father, John T. McCutcheon, was an American newspaper editorial cartoonist, war correspondent, and combat artist who worked for the Chicago Tribune from 1903 until his retirement in 1946 and won a Pulitzer Prize for his 1931 editorial cartoon, "A Wise Economist Asks a Question."

McCutcheon had two brothers, John McCutcheon Jr. and Barr McCutcheon. A sister, Evelyn McCutcheon, died in childhood. The McCutcheon family's primary residence was in Lake Forest, Illinois.

Shaw McCutcheon graduated from Harvard University with a degree in mathematics in 1943. After serving in the United States military during World War II, he returned to his study of art at the Chicago Academy of Fine Arts.

== Career ==
McCutcheon spent thirty-six years (1950–1986) as an editorial cartoonist for the Spokesman-Review in Spokane, Washington. Examples of his work are in the permanent collection of the Northwest Museum of Art & Culture in Spokane.

== Death ==
McCutcheon died on July 6, 2016, in Spokane, Washington, at the age of 94.

== Links ==
- Original cartoons by McCutcheon
