= Mary Shaw McCutcheon =

American anthropologist, lecturer, researcher and pilot (born 1947)

- Born: July 13, 1947 (age 79); Chicago, Illinois
- Occupation: Anthropologist
- Relatives: John T. McCutcheon (grandfather) Howard Van Doren Shaw (great grandfather) John T. McCutcheon Jr. (father) Susan Dart (mother)

Mary Shaw McCutcheon (born July 13, 1947) is an American anthropologist whose primary research has been in Palau, Micronesia.

== Education ==
She graduated from Milton Academy in 1965, Rice University in 1969, and received a PHD in Anthropology from the University of Arizona in 1981.

== Career ==
She has held teaching positions at the University of Maryland, the University of Guam, and George Mason University She has worked in various museums, including the Smithsonian

== Aviation ==
She has flown as a pilot for humanitarian and environmental organizations such as SouthWings, Pilots N Paws, Wings of Appreciation, Young Eagles, and Angel Flight, and has held Chair and Secretary positions in the Old Dominion chapter of the Ninety-Nines.
