= Blue Lagoon Island =

Private island in The Bahamas

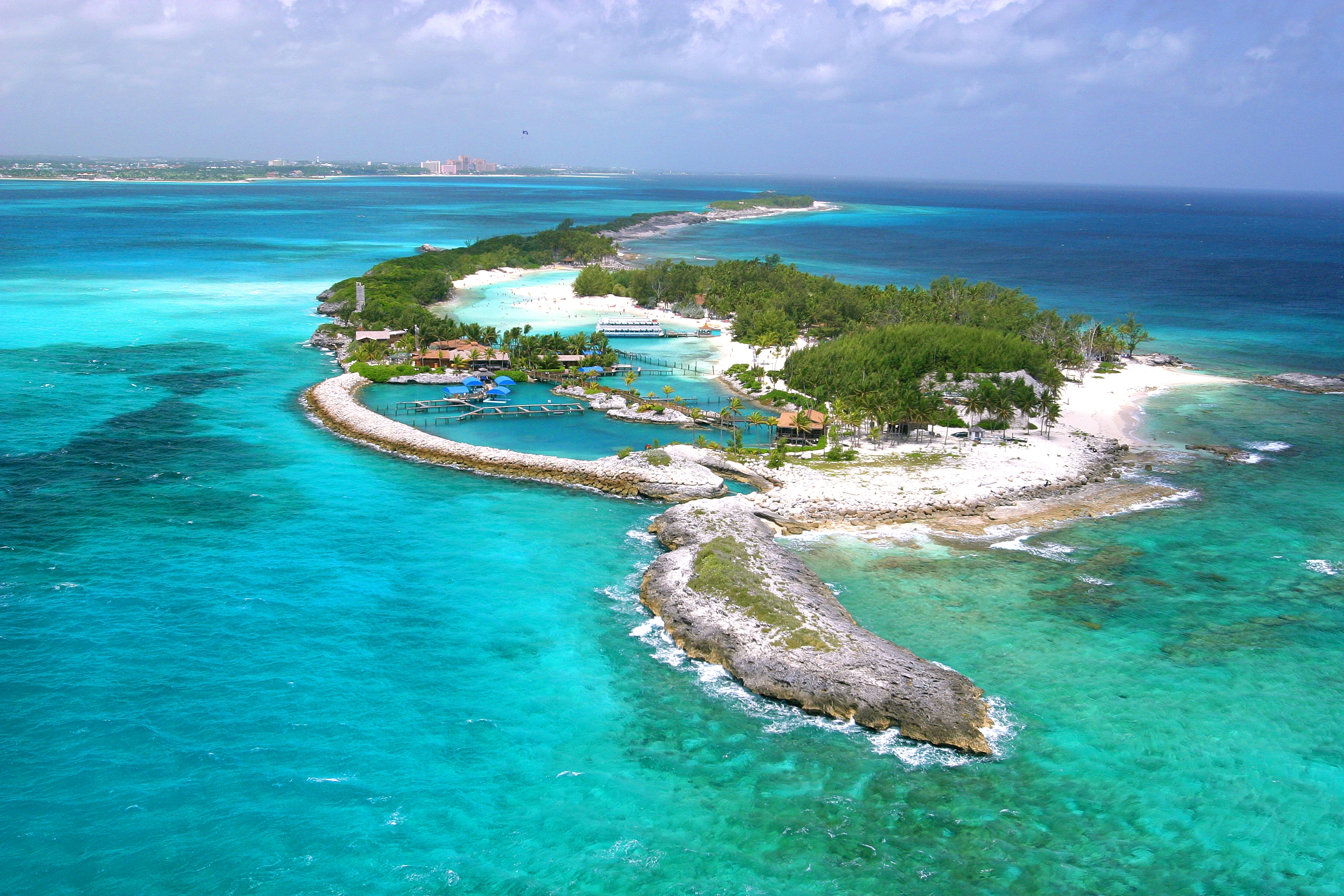
- Interactive map of Blue Lagoon Island

Geography
- Location: Caribbean
- Coordinates: 25°05′54″N 77°16′16″W
- Archipelago: Bahamas
- Total islands: 1
- Major islands: Blue Lagoon Island

Administration
- Bahamas

Demographics
- Population: 0 (2000)

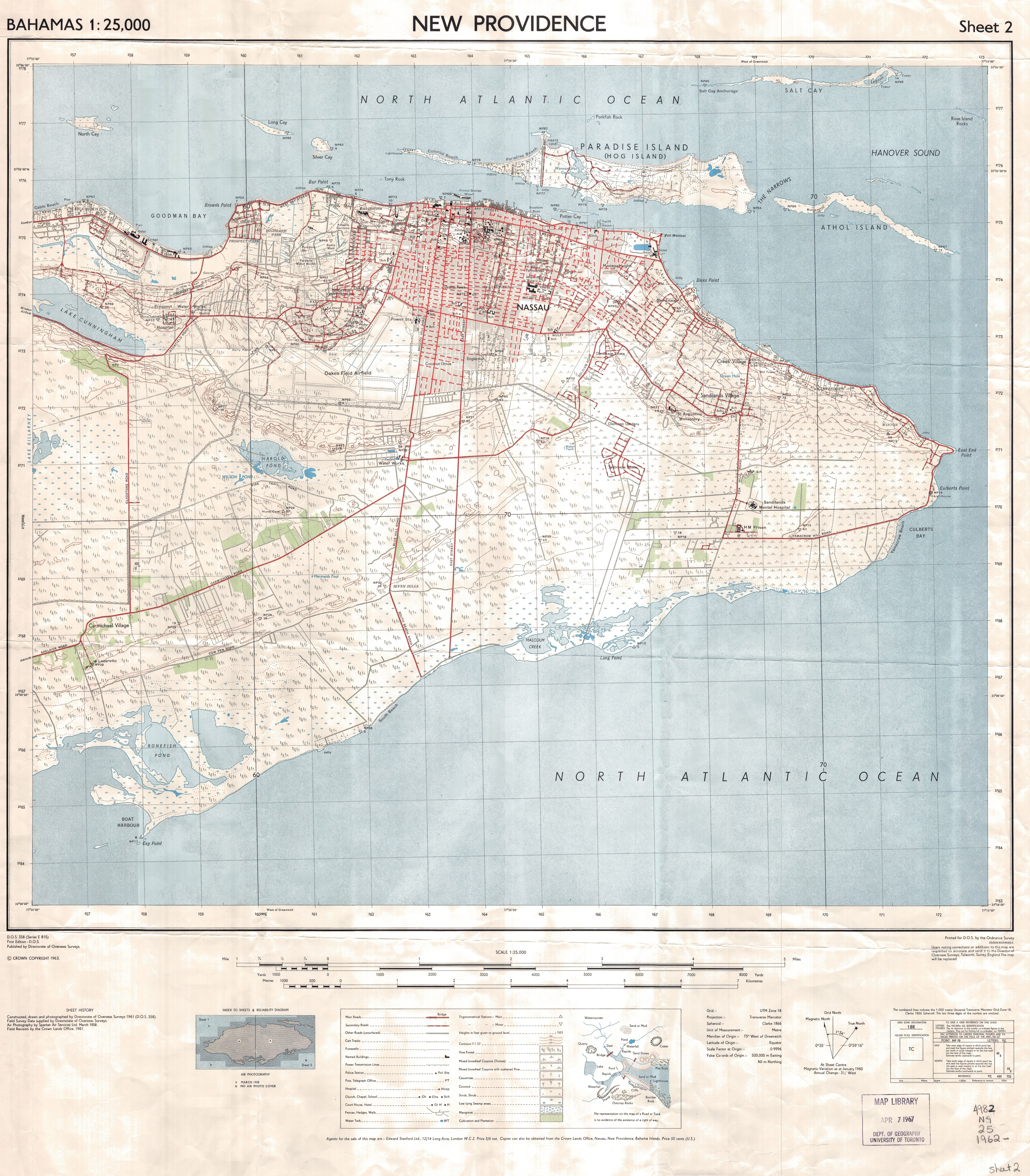
Salt Cay on top of the topographic map sheet of 1962

Blue Lagoon Island is a private island located 5 km (3.1 mi) from Nassau, Bahamas, and serves as a local tourist attraction.

== History ==
=== Early history ===
Prior to the late 19th century the island's lagoon was a salt marsh and was referred to legally as Salt Cay. The Island became a stopover for pirates and privateers who used the island to cull salt from the lagoon to preserve their food and as a rest stop while they waited for permission to enter Nassau Harbour.

=== 1875–1939 ===
In 1875, Charles King-Harman, an Englishman who was later knighted and became Governor of Cyprus, bought the island from the British Crown for £35. He owned it for 11 years, until he sold it to a Bahamian, Sir Augustus John Adderley, for £105. Adderley kept it for six years. Two Americans who wanted to cultivate corn and vegetables offered him £145. The farming effort failed and in 1902 they sold it to Abraham Van Winkle for a £10 loss (£135).

Van Winkle hired hundreds of laborers to dredge out the salt marsh and blasted a cut into the lagoon from the sea, planted 5,000 palm trees and built over a mile of meandering concrete paths. He later imported a zoo of monkeys, peacocks, turkeys, pheasants, parrots, and iguanas to populate the paradise garden. He shared the island with the public by bringing guests over on his boat at a rate of $1 per person.

From 1916 to 1979 (63 years) the island was owned by the McCutcheon family. John T. McCutcheon was the chief foreign correspondent of the Chicago Tribune, a Pulitzer Prize winner, and political cartoonist. He purchased the island (Salt Cay) by mail sight unseen for $17,500 from the estate of Van Winkle, a New Jersey manufacturer who had died. He called it Treasure Island and for decades it was known under that name in the Bahamas.

Part of the charm of the island was the primitive living conditions.

=== World War II training base ===
During World War II, the island was requisitioned for a year by the Allies for use as a secret training base for three teams of British and American underwater demolition squads who would swim the seven miles (11 km) around the island every day. Explosives and depth charges were blown up regularly around the island, and in the evenings, they would toss hand grenades over the cliff. It was thought that the concussions weakened the cliff so much that it caused the small fort to collapse.

=== Post-war ===
In October 1979, L. A. Meister purchased the island.

In 1991, a storm cut the island in two at the northwestern corner of the lagoon where a bridge is now located. On a sunny, clear, windless day, the island experienced 9 metres (30 ft) swells generated by the storm over 2,000 km (1,200 mi) away.

In 1993, Dolphin Encounters, a marine mammal facility, began educational and commercial programs on Blue Lagoon Island.

In 1995, Dolphin Encounters on Blue Lagoon Island underwent a multimillion-dollar expansion which enlarged the dolphin habitat to over three acres in surface space and created depths of up to 25-feet.

On 21 November 2023, a Blue Lagoon Island tourist ferry capsized and sank, resulting in the death of a 75-year old female passenger.

== Bibliography ==
- McCutcheon, H. Shaw (2001). A Family Island - A Short History of Salt Cay, Bahamas. Salt Cay Publishing. p. 114. ISBN 0-9715260-0-1
