= Satirical cartography =

Political artwork

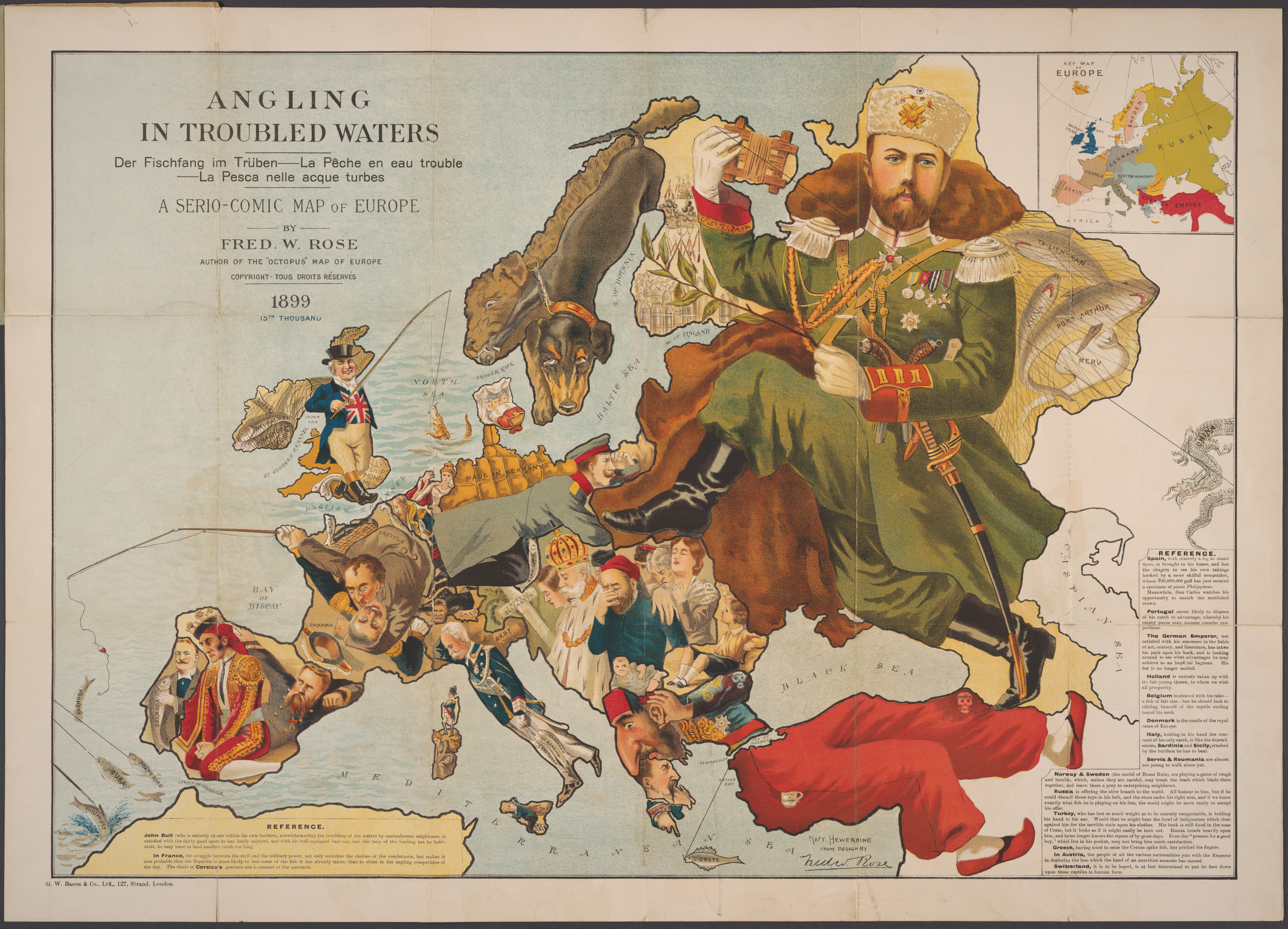
"Angling in Troubled Waters", a satirical map of Europe by Frederick W. Rose, from 1899

Satirical cartography is a form of art, exposing stereotypes and political messages with comical geopolitical illustrations. Satirical cartography dates back to the late 18th century and the early 19th century. Hannah Humphrey and Frederick W. Rose are among the earliest pioneers in cartoonish maps.

== Description ==
In some cases, satirical cartography is meant to critique places and peoples or alternatively the stereotypes forming around given places and peoples. They are often used as a way to communicate a message or influence ideas, rather than present objective geographic features. Satirical cartography has also been used as a justification for war, leading multiple satire maps depicting World War I to be created.

== See also ==
- View of the World from 9th Avenue
