= John T. McCutcheon =

American cartoonist (1870–1949)

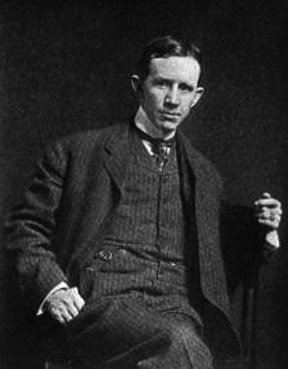
- McCutcheon, 1902
- Born: May 6, 1870; Tippecanoe County, Indiana, US
- Died: June 10, 1949 (aged 79); Lake Forest, Illinois, US
- Resting place: Graceland Cemetery
- Education: Purdue University (BS)
- Occupations: Newspaper cartoonist, author, and war correspondent
- Spouse: Evelyn (Shaw) McCutcheon
- Children: 4, including Shaw
- Relatives: George Barr McCutcheon (brother) Mary Shaw McCutcheon (granddaughter)
- Writing career
- Notable awards: Pulitzer Prize

John Tinney McCutcheon (May 6, 1870 – June 10, 1949) was an American newspaper political cartoonist, war correspondent, combat artist, and author who won a Pulitzer Prize for his 1931 editorial cartoon, "A Wise Economist Asks a Question", and became known even before his death as the "Dean of American Cartoonists". He moved to Chicago, Illinois, in 1890 to work as an artist and occasional writer for the Chicago Morning News (later named the News Record, the Chicago Record, and the Record-Herald). His first front-page cartoon appeared in 1895 and his first published political cartoon was published during the U. S. presidential campaign of 1896. McCutcheon introduced human interest themes to newspaper cartoons in 1902 and joined the staff of the Chicago Tribune in 1903, remaining there until his retirement in 1946. McCutcheon's cartoons appeared on the front page of the Tribune for forty years.

Among his best-known works are "Injun Summer", considered one of the best in his "boy" series of cartoons; his series of "Bird Center" cartoons, which depicted daily life in a fictional small town; and "The Colors", one of his most famous wartime cartoons. His autobiography, Drawn from Memory (1950), was published posthumously. As a war correspondent and combat artist, McCutcheon covered the Spanish–American War, the Battle of Manila Bay and the Philippine–American War, and the Second Boer War in South Africa. He also reported from Europe during World War I, beginning with his eyewitness account of the German invasion of Belgium. In addition, McCutcheon, made several trips to Asia, Mexico, Africa, and the Bahamas, where he owned a private island called Salt Cay.

== Early life and education ==
John Tinney McCutcheon was born on May 6, 1870, near South Raub in rural Tippecanoe County, Indiana, to Captain John Barr McCutcheon and Clara (Glick) McCutcheon. McCutcheon's father was an American Civil War veteran, a farmer, stock raiser, and sheriff of Tippecanoe County. The McCutcheon family moved to Lafayette, Indiana, in 1876, when John Barr McCutcheon was named the first director of Purdue University's farming operations.

McCutcheon had two brothers and one sister. His older brother was journalist and novelist George Barr McCutcheon (1866–1928), who authored Graustark (1901) and its related books, as well as other literary works. Ben Frederick McCutcheon, the youngest brother, became a columnist for the Chicago Tribune and, after 1905, its commercial editor. Ben McCutcheon also headed in publishing company. All three brothers wrote and did drawings during their youth. Their sister was Jessie (McCutcheon) Nelson.

John McCutcheon attended Purdue University and graduated in 1889 with a Bachelor of Science degree in industrial arts. While a college student at Purdue, he became a founding member of the campus's Sigma Chi fraternity chapter and worked with typographer Bruce Rogers on the Exponent, the student newspaper that McCutcheon helped to establish. McCutcheon also co-edited Purdue's first yearbook, the Debris.

== Marriage and family ==
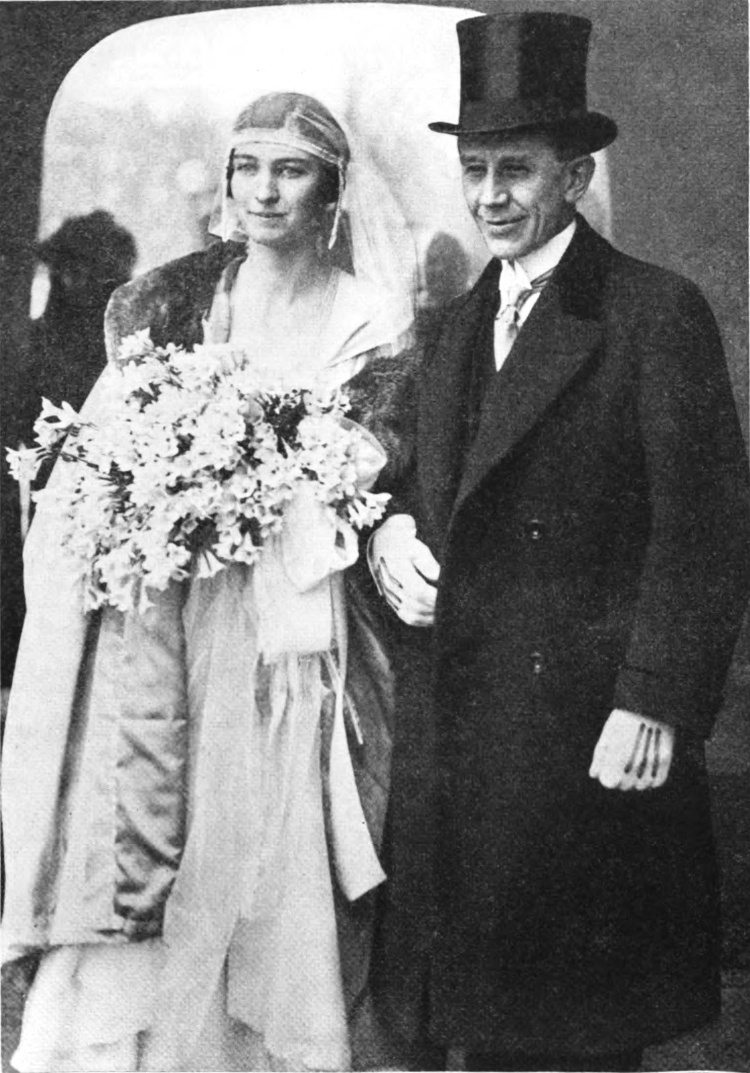
John T. and Evelyn (Shaw) McCutcheon

On January 20, 1917, McCutcheon married Evelyn Shaw, the daughter of his friend Howard Van Doren Shaw, despite being twenty-four years older than her. The McCutcheons were the parents of three sons, John Jr., Howard Shaw, and George Barr. A daughter, Evelyn, died in childhood. Shaw McCutcheon became an editorial cartoonist and worked for The Spokesman-Review in Spokane, Washington, for thirty-six years.

The McCutcheon family maintained a home in Lake Forest, Illinois, and from 1916 to 1979, owned Salt Cay, a private island in the Bahamas. McCutcheon introduced Carl Sandburg to the Bahamian song, "The John B. Sails," which subsequently became a standard.

== Career ==
=== Early years ===
In his early years in Indiana, McCutcheon wrote a weekly column of local news for the Lafayette Journal. He moved to Chicago, Illinois in 1890, after graduating from Purdue, to work as an artist for the Chicago Morning News (later named the News Record, the Chicago Record, and finally the Record-Herald).

He sketched images of major news events and occasionally wrote feature stories and news articles. McCutcheon urged George Ade, his friend and Sigma Chi fraternity brother, to join him at the newspaper and the two were roommates in Chicago for a few years. (Ade later became a well-known author, journalist, and playwright.)

In 1892, McCutcheon and Ade collaborated on "All Roads Lead to the Fair," which were illustrated stories about the World's Columbian Exhibition in Chicago. McCutcheon also illustrated Ade's series of stories about everyday life in Chicago called "Stories of the Streets and the Town". Collections of Ade's articles and McCutcheon's illustrations were published in a series of books from 1894 to 1900.

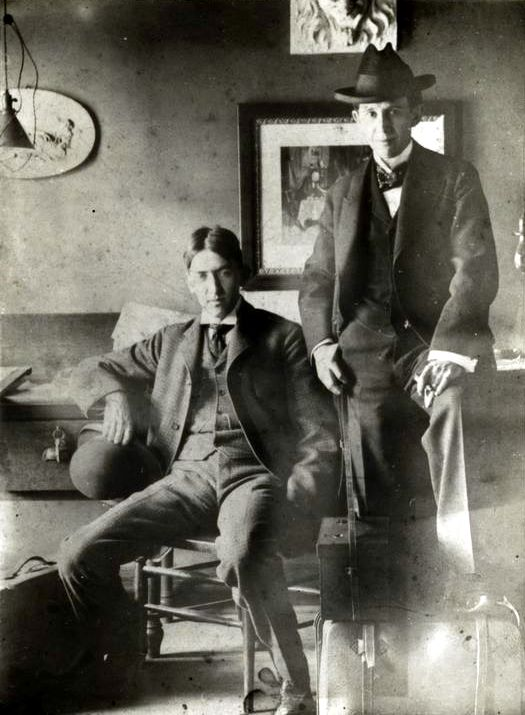
George Ade (left) and McCutcheon, c. 1894/95

McCutcheon's first front-page cartoon appeared in 1895. His artistic style also transitioned from illustrator to cartoonist beginning with his first published political cartoons during the William McKinley–William Jennings Bryan presidential campaign of 1896. McCutcheon's five-column work for the front page of the Record-Herald featured humorous cartoons, not merely illustrations of news stories. A signature part of his cartoons also included the regular appearance of a non-descript dog, which became popular with his audience. In 1902 McCutcheon introduced a new type of cartoon that featured human-interest themes. He also began his famous series of boy-themed cartoons. Another series reported on Prince Henry of Prussia's American tour.

=== Chicago Tribune cartoonist ===
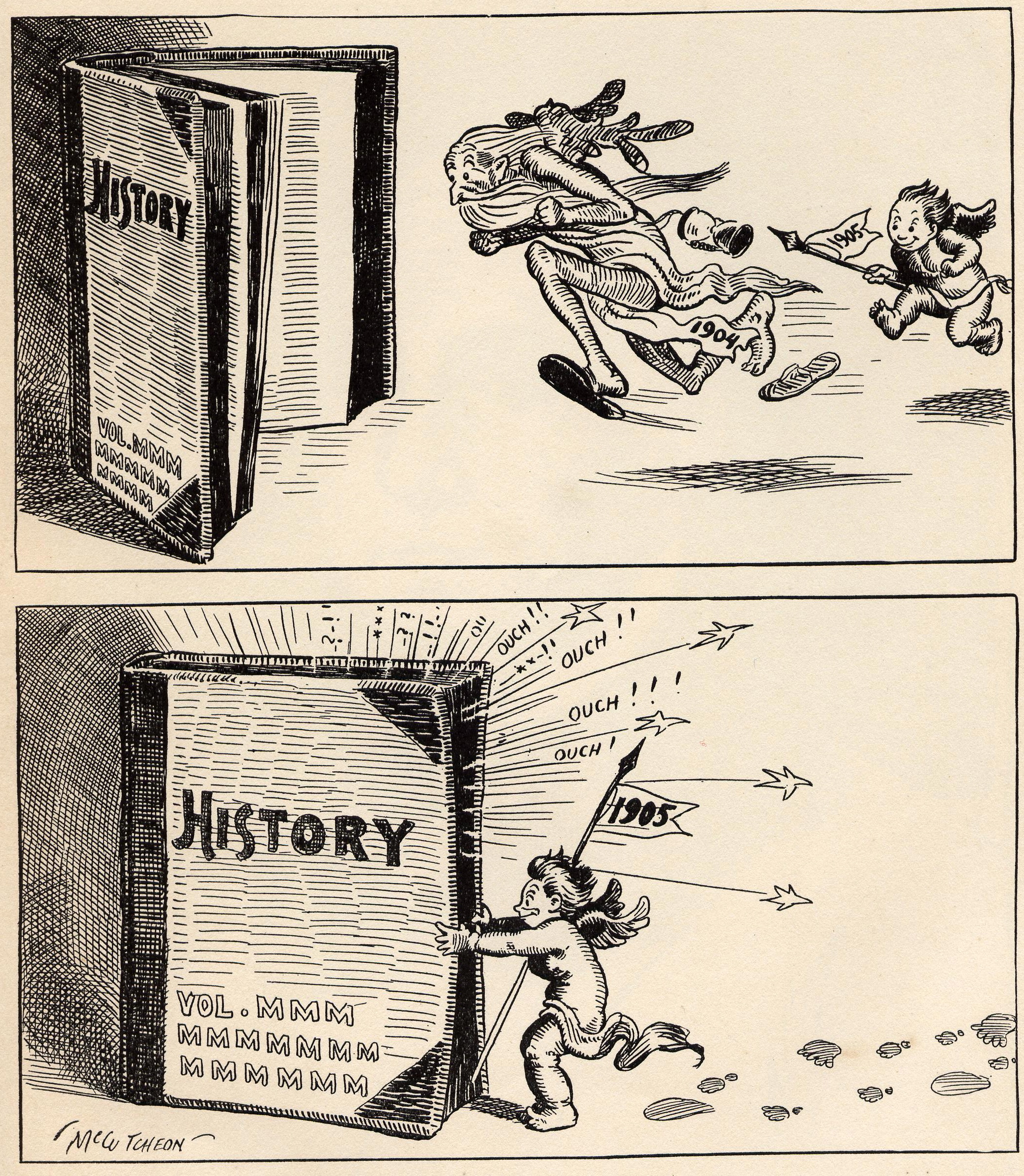
Baby New Year 1905 chases old 1904 into the history books in this John T. McCutcheon cartoon.

McCutcheon left the Record-Herald in 1903 and moved to the Chicago Tribune where he remained until his retirement in 1946. McCutcheon brought along his boy-theme cartoons, as well as his signature dog illustration, but he also introduced another human-interest series. In describing his reason for creating his human interest-themed cartoons, McCutcheon said, "I always enjoyed drawing a type of cartoon which might be considered a sort of pictorial breakfast food. It had the cardinal asset of making the beginning of the day sunnier." McCutcheon's "Bird Center" cartoons depicted a fictional small town that included a stereotypical cast of characters. A collection of his work from the series was published as Bird Center Cartoons: Chronicle of Social Happenings at Bird Center (1904).

McCutcheon's cartoons appeared on the front page of the Chicago Tribune for forty years and included many memorable works such as "A Boy in Springtime" and "Injun Summer" (considered one of the best in this "boy" series). McCutcheon won the Pulitzer Prize for his 1931 editorial cartoon, "A Wise Economist Asks A Question."

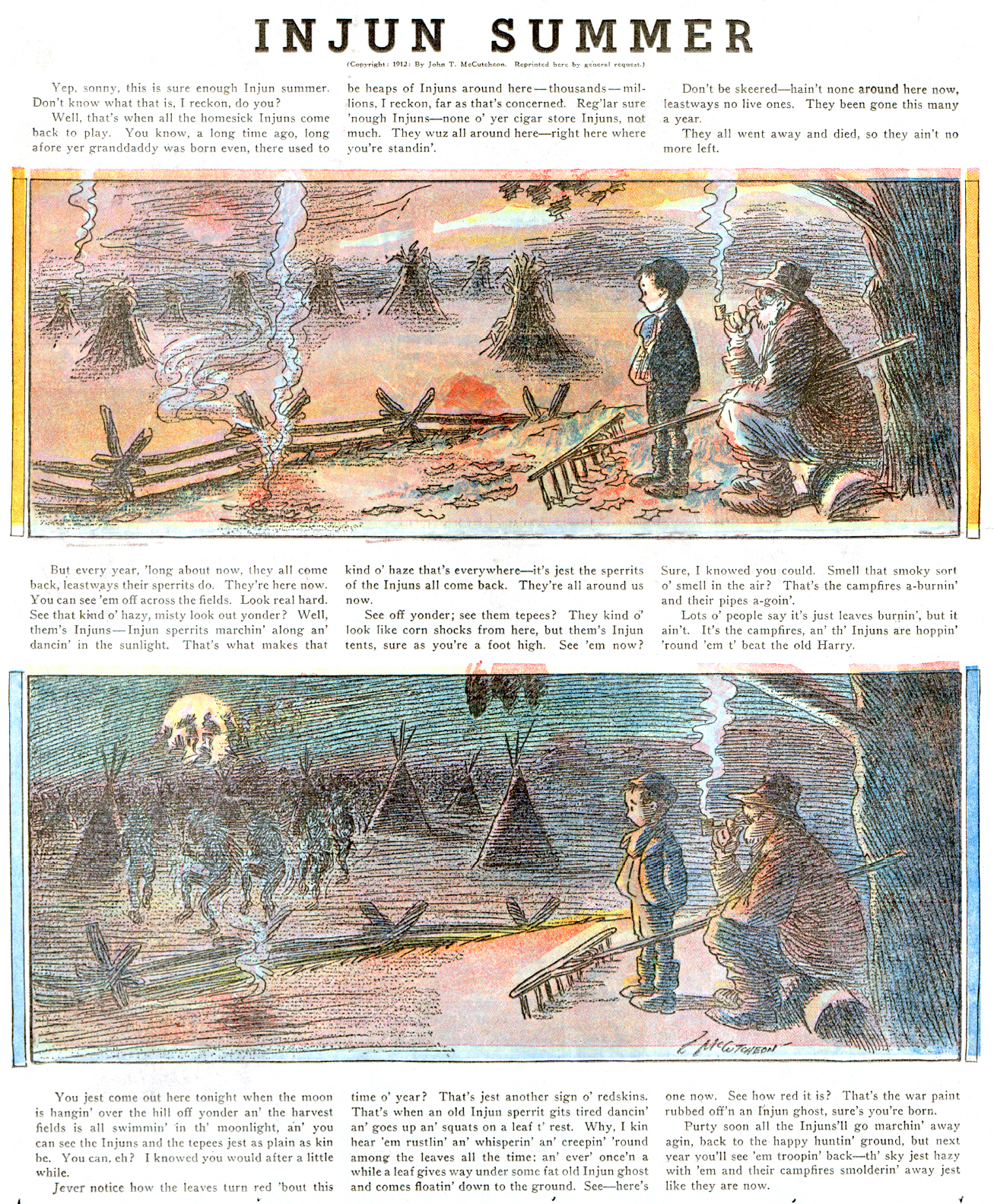
"Injun Summer", 1907

His famous "Injun Summer" cartoon was first published on September 29, 1907, and was reprinted in the Tribune in 1910. It also appeared annually in the fall from 1912 until 1993. It became one of the most popular cartoon features in the Tribune's history. McCutcheon's inspiration for the cartoon came from his boyhood years in Indiana. In addition to annual reprints in the Tribune, a high-quality print was published in a Sunday edition in 1919. The cartoon was also featured in an Indiana State Fair exhibit in 1928 and as a lifesize diorama and a fireworks display at the Century of Progress International Exposition in 1933–34. The Indiana Society of Chicago presented a dramatized version of "Injun Summer" in 1920 with McCutcheon's son, John Jr., portraying the young boy.

Despite its popularity, the Tribune began receiving letters of criticism in the 1970s for publishing what some considered as an "ethnically insensitive feature that misrepresented" Native Americans in the United States. Douglas Kneeland, a Tribune editor, called the cartoon "a relic of another age" and "a museum piece." Annual publication of "Injun Summer" was discontinued in 1993.

=== Correspondent, combat artist, and world traveler ===
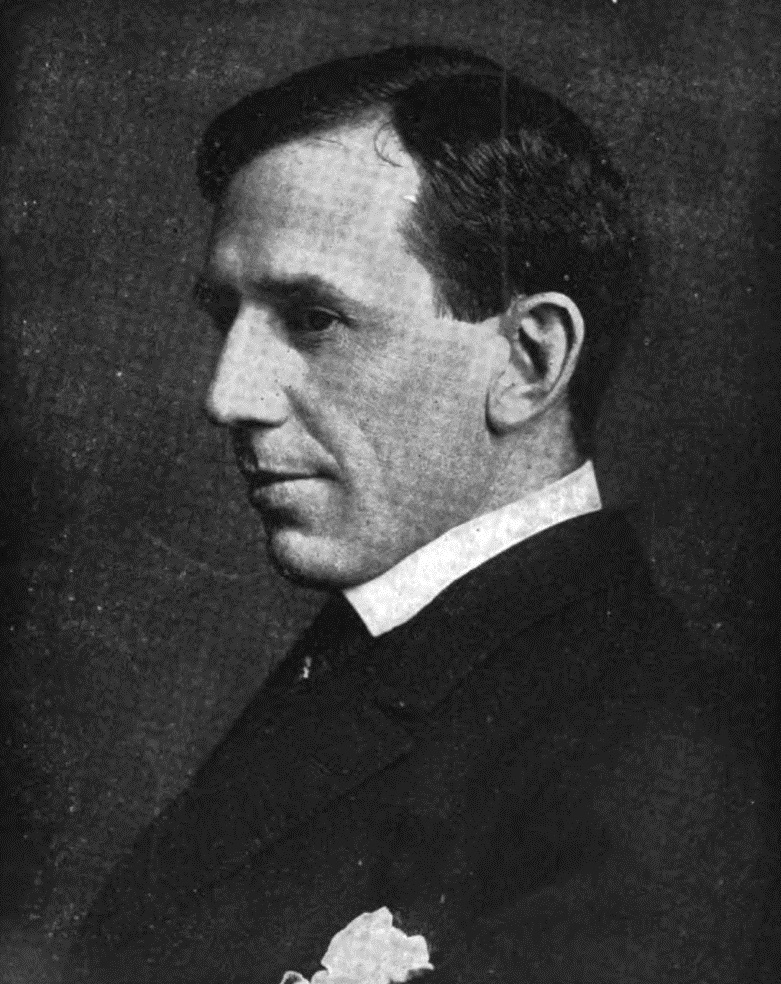
John T. McCutcheon

In addition to his work as a newspaper cartoonist, McCutcheon became a war correspondent and combat artist who covered the Spanish–American War, the Philippine–American War, and the Second Boer War in South Africa, as well as Europe during World War I. He also became a world traveler. McCutcheon and his friend, George Ade, went to Europe in 1895 to collaborate on illustrated stories for the Chicago News. A collection of their work was later published as a book, What a Man Sees Who Goes Away from Home (1896). On January 8, 1898, McCutcheon began an around-the-world cruise aboard the McCulloch as a guest of the U.S. Treasury Department. He visited Malta, Singapore, and Hong Kong before transferring to the USS Olympia. McCutcheon was an eyewitness to the Battle of Manila Bay on May 1, 1898, and remained in the Philippines for several months to report on war before resuming his travels.

McCutcheon's adventures included trips to Africa to report on the Boer War in 1900. He later returned to Africa in 1909–10 to take part in big-game hunting and spent some time on safari with Theodore Roosevelt. In 1914, McCutcheon traveled to Mexico, where he met and drew a portrait of Pancho Villa. During a trip to Europe in 1914–16 as a war correspondent, McCutcheon was an eye-witness to the German invasion of Belgium at the beginning of World War I. He also covered the war in England and France before returning to his work as a cartoonist in Chicago.

== Later years ==
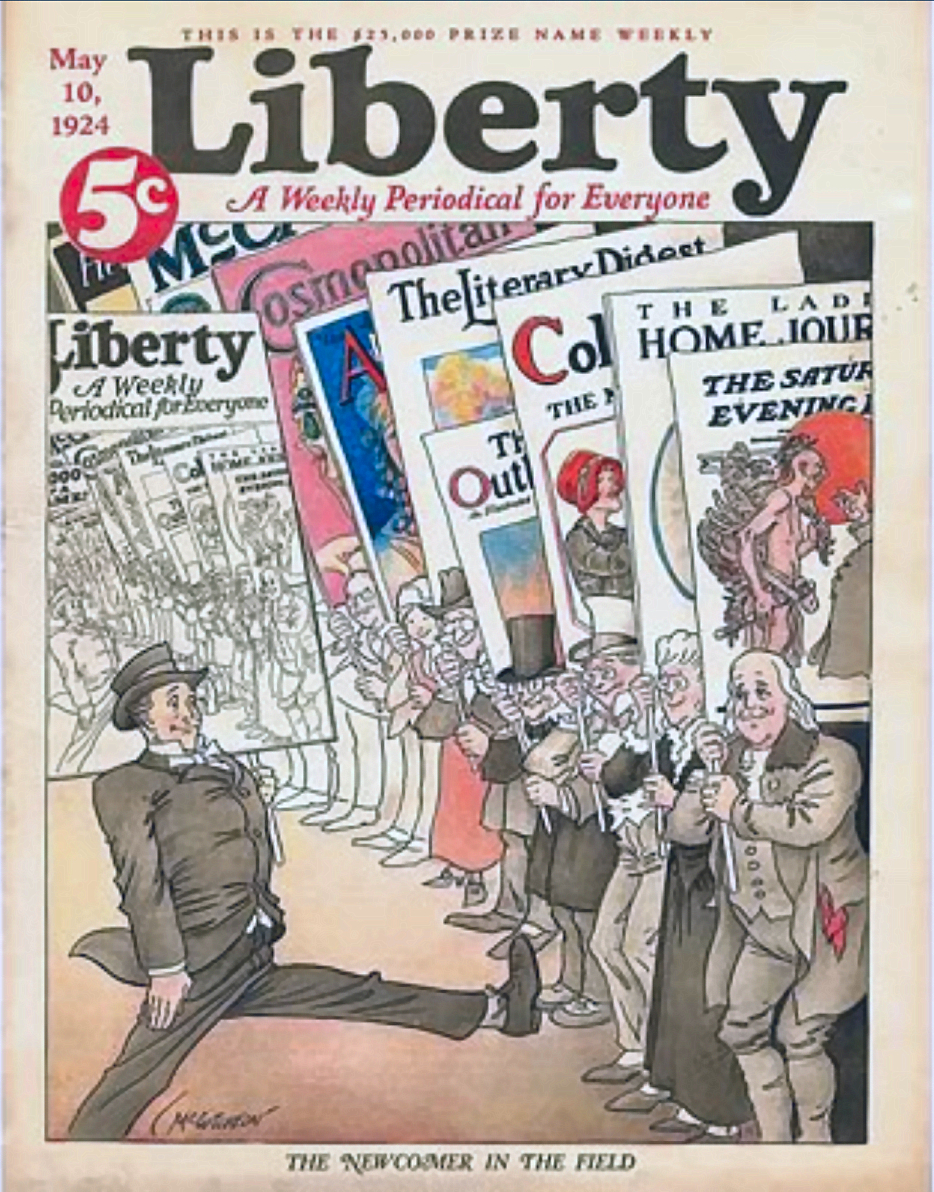
McCutcheon drew the cover art for the first issue of Liberty magazine in 1924.

From 1921 until 1948, McCutcheon served as the first president of the Chicago Zoological Society, overseeing the construction, opening, and early years of Brookfield Zoo. There was talk of renaming the zoo after him, but he refused the offer.

During his sixty-year career as an artist, McCutcheon became one of the highest paid cartoonists in the United States. He also supplemented his income with freelance work and publishing numerous books. In addition, McCutcheon was considered the "Dean of American Cartoonists" even before his death in 1949. Although he drew fewer cartoons in his later years, McCutcheon's work appeared on the front page of the Sunday edition of the Chicago Tribune until his retirement in 1946. He also continued traveling the world, an activity he had enjoyed throughout his life and took frequent trips to his island home in the Bahamas. McCutcheon also began work on his autobiography, but he died before completing it.

== Death and legacy ==
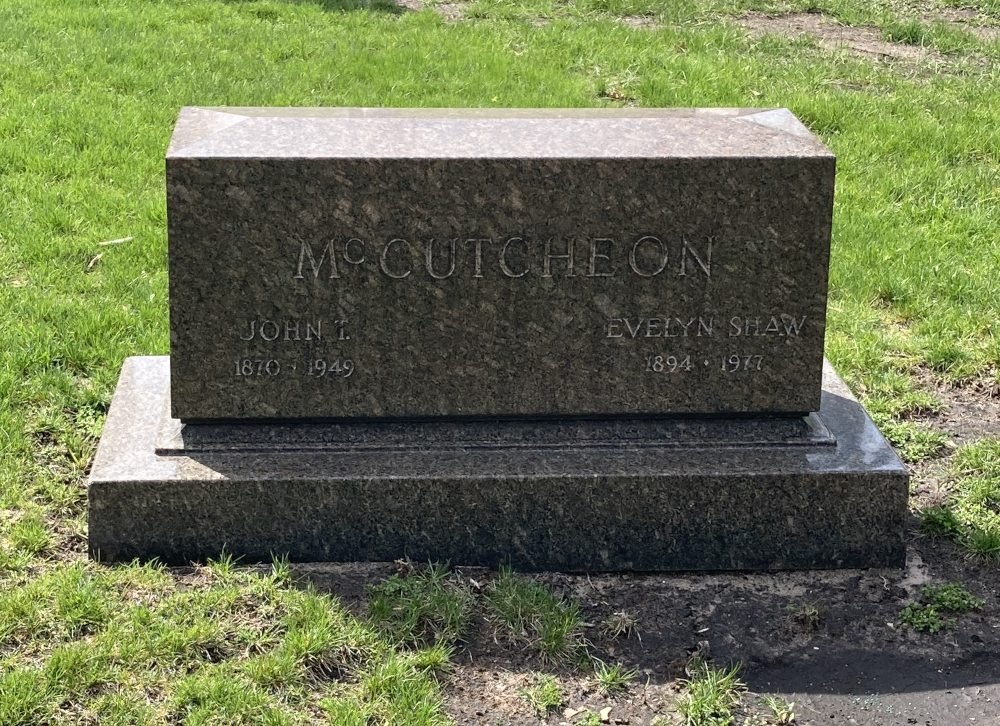
McCutcheon's grave at Graceland Cemetery

McCutcheon died in his sleep at his home in Lake Forest, Illinois, on June 10, 1949. He was buried at Graceland Cemetery in Chicago. Evelyn McCutcheon completed her husband's unfinished autobiography, Drawn from Memory, which was published posthumously in 1950. She also disbursed his collection of original drawings.

Examples of McCutcheon's work are in the Archives and Special Collections of Purdue University at West Lafayette, Indiana; the Indiana Historical Society's collections at Indianapolis; the Chicago History Museum, the Chicago Public Library, and The Newberry Library in Chicago, Illinois; at Syracuse University in Syracuse, New York; and in the collections of the University of Missouri Libraries.

Best known for his political cartoons, McCutcheon was also a noted war correspondent of the early twentieth century. Chicago Daily News managing editor Charles H. Dennis called McCutcheon's "The Battle in Tilad Pass", a report on the Filipino Insurrection, "the finest piece of war reporting” that he had known." Carey Orr, a McCutcheon successor as editorial cartoonist at the Chicago Tribune called him "the father of the human-interest cartoon".

McCutcheon was also famous for the folksy cartoons of rural life at the fictional town of Bird Center. Syndicated columnist O. O. McIntyre once wrote of McCutcheon: "No cartoonist of his or any other time has so influenced public thought and clarified it for better thinking about affairs at home and abroad." Among his most famous cartoons were the 1931 Pulitzer Prize –winning editorial cartoon, "A Wise Economist Asks a Question" and "The Colors", one of his most famous wartime cartoons, which depicts in four panels the scenes of a peaceful harvest, dead soldiers on a battlefield, a group of mourners, and the soldiers' gravestones that is accompanied by his four-line poem. Other memorable cartoons are "Mail Call", which depicts a soldier who did not receive mail standing in the middle of a crowd of happy soldiers who did, and "The Mysterious Stranger", about Missouri's defection from the Democratic ranks of the Solid South to join the Republicans.

== Honors and awards ==
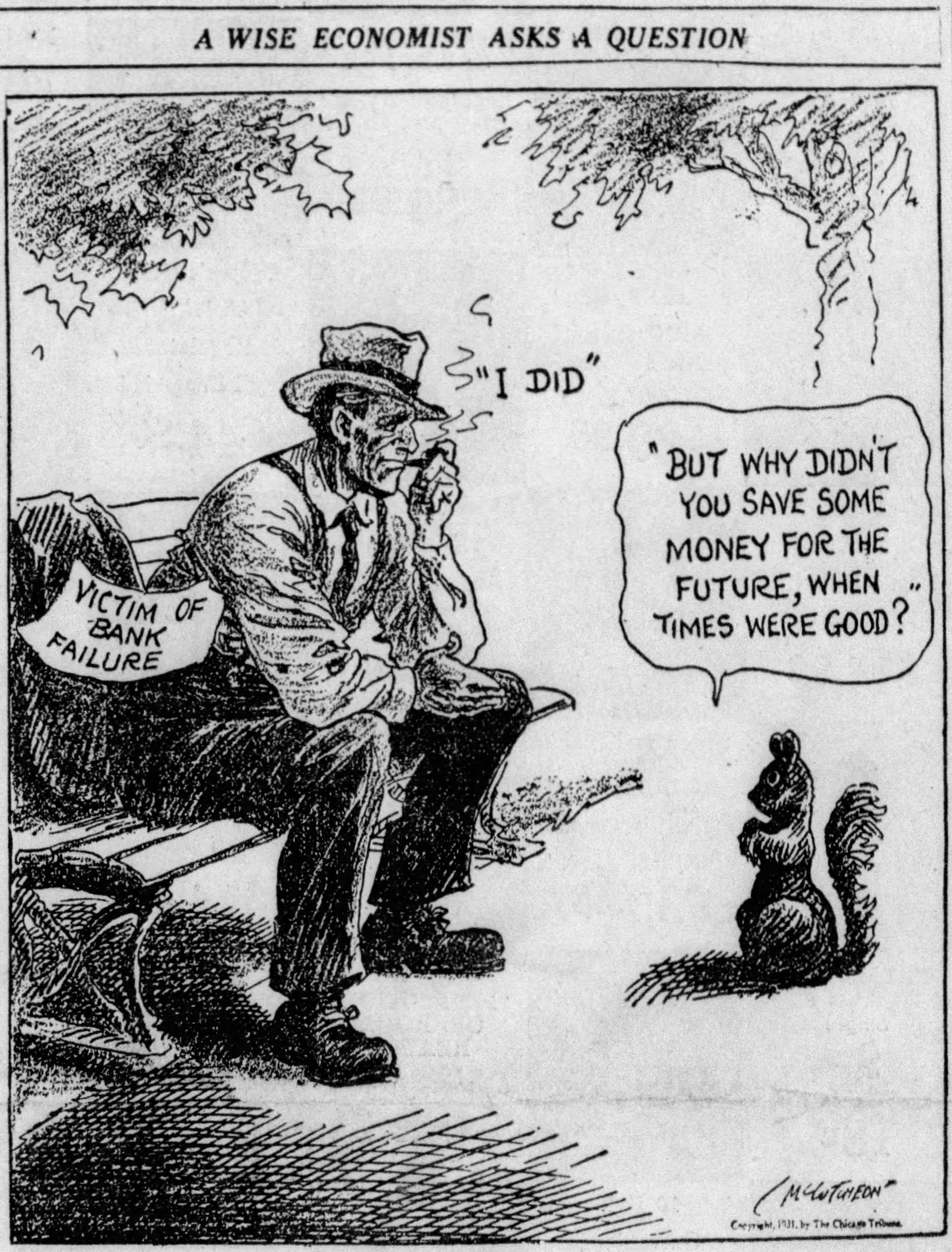
McCutcheon received the Pulitzer Prize for Editorial Cartooning for "A Wise Economist Asks a Question".

- In 1927 McCutcheon and other American cartoonists that included Kin Hubbard (creator of the Abe Martin comic strip), Gaar Williams, Harold Gray (famous for the Little Orphan Annie comic strip), and Fontaine Fox (creator of the Toonerville Folks comics) had their work featured in the annual Hoosier Salon art exhibition.
- McCutcheon's 1932 Pulitzer Prize–winning editorial cartoon, "A Wise Economist Asks a Question", was a Great Depression-era cartoon about a victim of bank failure.
- McCutcheon High School at Tippecanoe County, Indiana, (his home county) is named in his honor.
- McCutcheon is memorialized in a coeducational dormitory named McCutcheon Hall on the Purdue University campus in West Lafayette, Indiana. The lobby displays an original of one of his drawings, a nearly life-size drawing of a young man.
- Travel Plaza 1, Mile Post 22, at Portage, Indiana, on the Indiana Toll Road is named after McCutcheon.

== Selected published works ==
- Stories of Filipino Warfare (1900)
- Boy Calendar (1903)
- Cartoons: A Selection of One Hundred Drawings (1903) with introduction by George Ade
- Army Song Book (1918)
- Bird Center Cartoons: Chronicle of Social Happenings at Bird Center (1904)
- The Mysterious Stranger and Other Cartoons (1905)
- Congressman Pumphrey, the People's Friend (1907)
- What Does Christmas Really Mean? (1908) with J. L. Jones
- Injun Summer (1907)
- Doing the Grand Canyon (1909) illustrated with cartoons by the author
- In Africa: Hunting Adventures in the Big Game Country (1910)
- T.R. in Cartoons (1910)
- History of Indiana (1911)
- Dawson ’11, Fortune Hunter (1912)
- The Restless Age (1921)
- An Heir At Large (1923)
- The Island Song Book (1927) illustrated with photographs and cartoons by the author
- Drawn from Memory: The Autobiography of John T. McCutcheon (1950)

In addition to his own work, McCutcheon illustrated newspaper and magazine stories and books for George Ade, as well as providing illustration for his brother, novelist George Barr McCutcheon.

== Sources ==
- Banta, R. E., compiler (1949). Indiana Authors and Their Books, 1816–1916. Crawfordsville, Indiana: Wabash College. OCLC 1044959.
- Benzkofer, Stephan (October 16, 2011). "Class cartoon had life of its own". Chicago Tribune. Chicago, Illinois.
- Culver, Nina (July 6, 2016). "Former longtime SR editorial cartoonist Shaw McCutcheion dies at 94". The Spokesman-Review. Spokane, Washington.
- Gascoine, Kelly (2008). John T. McCutcheon Collection, 1883–1943 (Bulk 1914–1929) Collection Guide (PDF). Indianapolis: Indiana Historical Society.
- Gugin, Linda C.; St. Clair, James E., eds. (2015). Indiana's 200: The People Who Shaped the Hoosier State. Indianapolis: Indiana Historical Society Press. ISBN 978-0-87195-387-2.
- Harvey, R. C. (December 6, 2012). "John T. McCutcheon, Dean of American Cartoonists: Adventurer and Inventor of the Slow Ball". The Comics Journal.
- "John T. McCutcheon Cartoons". Chicago Public Library.
- "John T. McCutcheon Cartoons Collection". Chicago History Museum. July 8, 2015.
- "John T. McCutcheon Papers". Syracuse University.
- "John T. McCutcheon Papers, 1834–1996". The Newberry Library.
- "John Tinney McCutcheon Collection of Editorial Cartoons". University of Missouri Libraries. Archived from the original on July 19, 2011.
- "McCutcheon, John T. (John Tinney), 1870–1949". Purdue University Archives and Special Collections.
- Simkin, John (September 1997). "John McCutcheon". Spartacus-educational.com.
