= American Progress =

Painting by John Gast

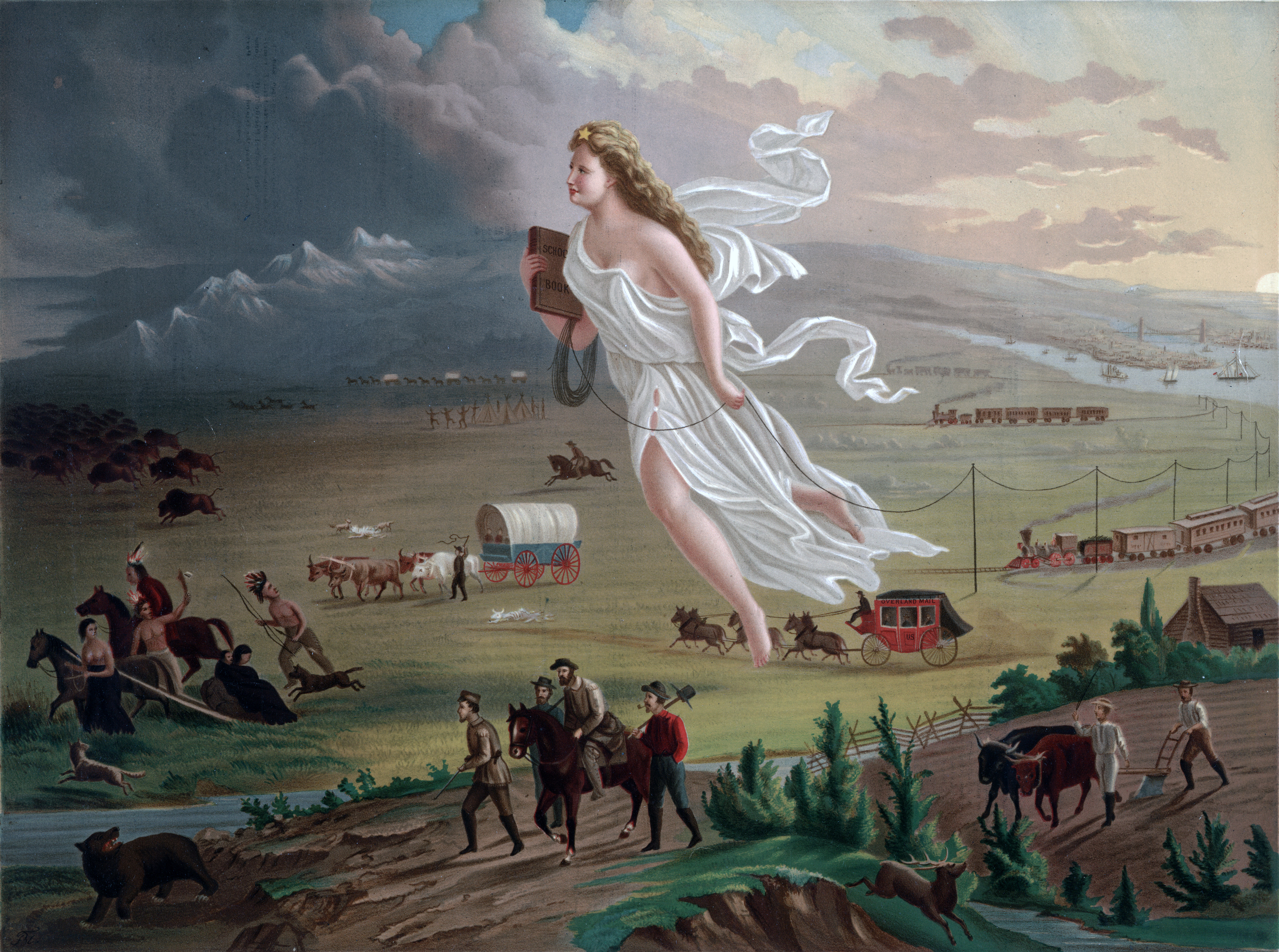
- Artist: John Gast
- Year: 1872
- Medium: Oil on canvas
- Subject: Manifest destiny, Settler colonialism
- Dimensions: 11 1/2 in × 15 3/4 in. (29.2 cm × 40 cm)
- Location: Autry Museum of the American West, Los Angeles, California
- Owner: Autry Museum of the American West
- Accession: 92.126.1
- Website: Exhibit website

American Progress is an 1872 painting by John Gast, a Prussian-born painter, printer, and lithographer who lived and worked during the 1870s in Brooklyn, New York. American Progress, an allegory of manifest destiny, was widely disseminated in chromolithographic prints. It is now held by the Autry Museum of the American West in Los Angeles, California.

== Description ==
The original painting has a size of 11.50 by 15.75 inches (29.2 cm × 40.0 cm). It was commissioned in 1872 by George Crofutt, a publisher of American Western travel guides.

The painting depicts a landscape of North America in the 19th century. The right side of the picture portrays locations on the east coast, which are already settled by Europeans. There, New York City can be seen, along with various ships around the coast of Manhattan. Also illustrated is the Brooklyn Bridge, which started construction just 2 years earlier and would not be completed until 1883 – 11 years later.

In the midpoint of the painting is Columbia, a female personification of the United States. On her head is what Crofutt calls "The Star of the Empire". She lays a telegraph wire with one hand and carries a school book in the other. Columbia represents the movement of civilization from the already well-settled east to the more sparsely populated west, leading settlers either on foot or by stagecoach, horseback, Conestoga wagon, wagon train, or riding steam trains.

To the left of the painting is depicted the western part of North America. The landscape is drawn to be much darker than the places already settled by Europeans with large dark clouds hanging over the distant mountains. A herd of American bison and group of indigenous people can be seen to be running into the dark, away from the approaching people.

In the foreground, Gast depicts a group of settlers, heading West, where a bear appears to growl at them, while behind them stands an already established farm with a person tilling the fields and another herding livestock, representing the Midwest.

== Significance ==
Much of the west was still occupied by Native Americans in 1872; Gast portrays the idea that America was destined to expand to this area as part of Manifest Destiny. The US Department of Homeland Security used the image with the heading "A Heritage to be proud of, a Homeland worth Defending" in a post on social media in August 2025.

The piece has been critiqued by Indigenous artists Klee Benally and Charles Hilliard in their respective works "The Dark Mark of Manifest Destiny" and "Reversing Manifest Destiny".
