= John Gast (painter) =

American painter & lithographer (1842–1896)

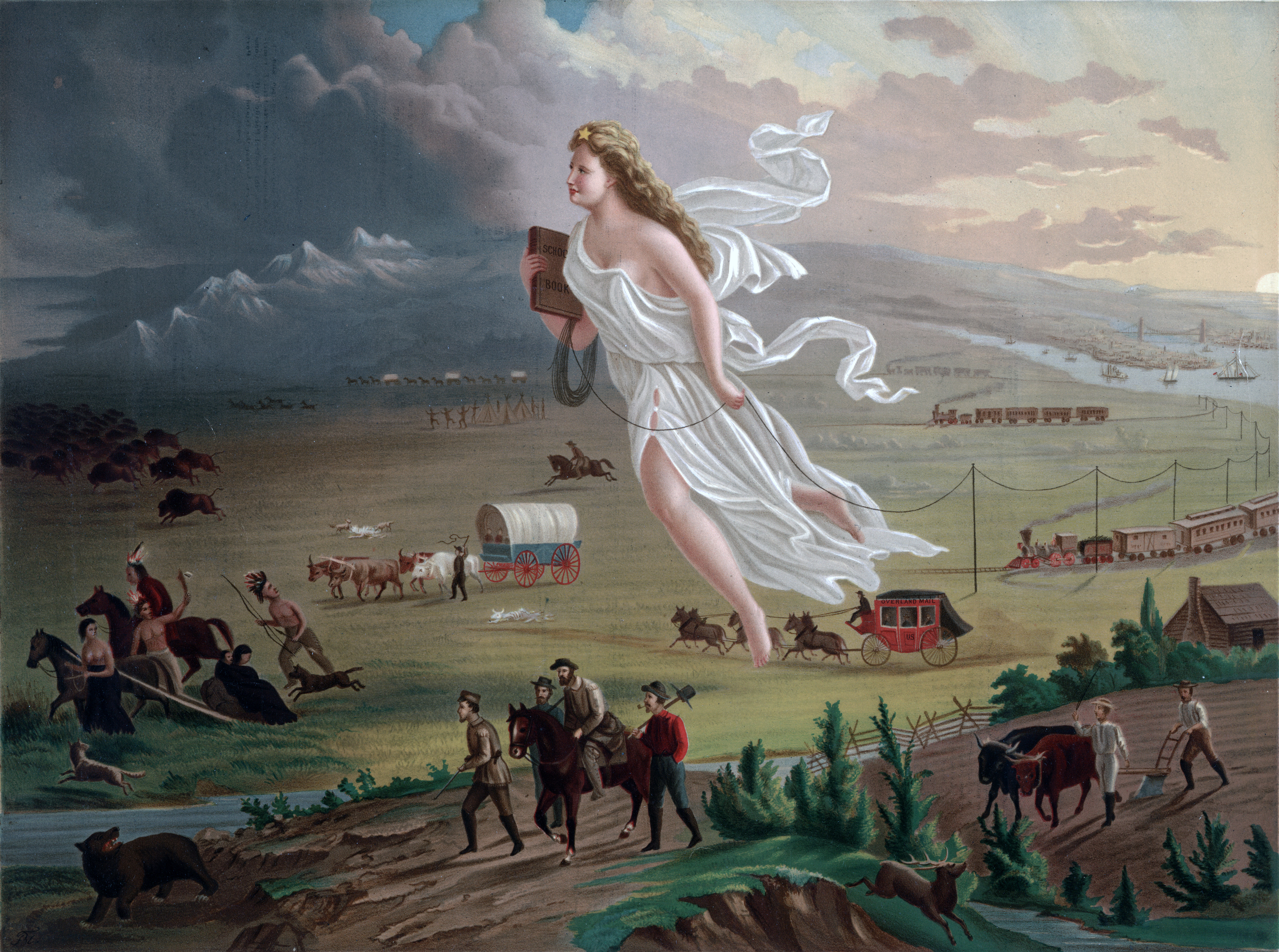
American Progress, 1872

John Gast (21 December 1842 in Berlin – 26 July 1896 in Brooklyn) was a Prussian-born American painter and lithographer.

His most famous work is American Progress (1872); this painting and many of his drawings are found in the Autry Museum of the American West in Los Angeles.

== Family in St. Louis ==
He was the son of Heinrich Konrad "Leopold" Gast and Bertha Pauline Henriette Volkmann. The family emigrated from Berlin to central Missouri wine country (present day Hermann, Missouri) before 1850. From there, the family moved to St. Louis a few years later. Leopold was a master lithographer, and with his brother August established the August Gast Banknote and Lithograph Company. It was a prominent printing house, making financial documents for governments, letterhead designs for industry, ornate certificates for churches, and many other paper documents for customers across the United States. The company exists today and its historic products are popular among collectors. John's brother Paulus became a prominent business and political leader in St. Louis. He established the Gast Winery in the Baden neighborhood after discharge from the Union Army in the Civil War in 1865, and this evolved into the Gast Brewery by 1900. The wine was shipped across the country and the brewery lasted into the 1940s.

== Education in Europe ==
Like his father, John became a lithographer. He left for Berlin in 1860 to finish his education during the Civil War. He earned a degree from the Royal Academy there and returned to St. Louis to work at his father's company. After three years, about 1867, he went to Paris to study art. The 1870 Census shows him living with his parents in St. Louis but within a year, he was working in New York. His drawings from Paris, Missouri, and New York at this time are in the Autry Museum collection.

== Life and career in New York ==
He married Augusta Marie Catherine Stohlmann (1841-1924) of New York about 1870. The couple resided at 297 Adelphi Street in Brooklyn. They had at least three children. Son John survived only a year, son Karl married but died in his 20s, and daughter Mary Louise Katherine Gast (1879-1940), survived into full adulthood.

In New York, John Gast helped launch the New York Daily Graphic, a newspaper that had a special lithographic section. He worked at the paper for about five years, but went on to establish his own lithograph firm, Gast and Company. John received patents for several lithograph processes and equipment, such as a special lithograph screen that enabled color printing. His company became the Photo-chrome Company and later Grey and Company. He is considered the inventor of the three-color lithograph process. Failing health required him to step back from his business ventures. He died of liver cancer in 1896 at age 53.

== Artistic works ==
His most famous painting was American Progress that was commissioned by George Crofutt, a publisher who reproduced the painting in his many travel guides to the American West. The painting glorified westward expansion and is considered the American equivalent to Eugène Delacroix's Liberty Leading the People (1830). Some of Gast's other paintings include: Bluffs on the Mississippi Below the Arsenal (1865), Angel Sitting on Mountain Top (1871), untitled (mother adjusting a blanket...) (1870s), American Prostonewares (1872), and Homeward (a ship sailing under dark skies, painted March 24, 1896, a few months before his death and perhaps his last work). His works are generally signed and dated.

== Bibliography ==
- Obituary in the Brooklyn Eagle, July 27, 1896, p. 7, c. 2.
