= Saul Steinberg =

Romanian-born American cartoonist (1914–1999)

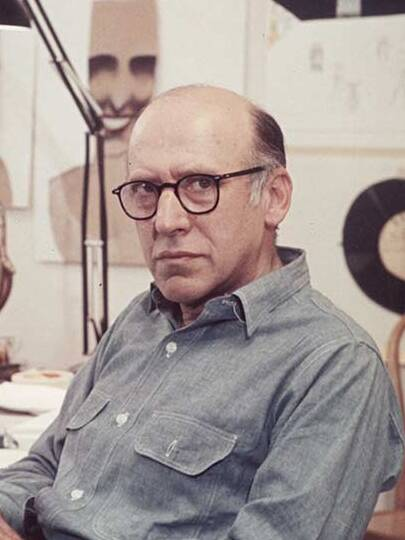
- Steinberg in his studio, 1970
- Born: Saul Erik Steinberg; June 15, 1914; Râmnicu Sărat, Kingdom of Romania
- Died: May 12, 1999 (aged 84); New York City, U.S.
- Education: Polytechnic University of Milan; University of Bucharest
- Known for: The New Yorker
- Style: Conceptual art
- Spouse: Hedda Sterne (m. 1944; sep. 1960)

Saul Steinberg (June 15, 1914, Rm. Sărat, Romania – May 12, 1999, New York City) was a Romanian-born American artist, best known for his work for The New Yorker, most notably View of the World from 9th Avenue. He described himself as "a writer who draws".

== Biography ==
Steinberg was born in Râmnicu Sărat, Buzău County, Romania to a family of Russian Jewish descent. In 1932, he entered the University of Bucharest. In 1933, he enrolled at the Polytechnic University of Milan to study architecture; he received his degree in 1940. In 1936, he began contributing cartoons to the humor newspaper Bertoldo. Two years later, the antisemitic racial laws promulgated by the fascist government forced him to start seeking refuge in another country.

In 1941, he fled to the Dominican Republic, where he spent a year awaiting a US visa. By then, his drawings had appeared in several US periodicals; his first contribution to The New Yorker was published in October 1941. Steinberg arrived in New York City in July 1942; within a few months he received a commission in the US Naval Reserve and was then seconded to the Office of Strategic Services (OSS). He worked for the Morale Operations division in China, North Africa, and Italy. Shipped back to Washington in 1944, he married the Romanian-born painter Hedda Sterne.

After World War II, Steinberg continued to publish drawings in The New Yorker and other periodicals, including Fortune, Vogue, Mademoiselle, and Harper's Bazaar. At the same time, he embarked on an exhibition career in galleries and museums. In 1946, he was included in the critically acclaimed "Fourteen Americans" show at The Museum of Modern Art, New York, exhibiting along with Arshile Gorky, Isamu Noguchi, and Robert Motherwell, among others.

Steinberg had more than 80 one-artist shows in galleries and museums in the US, Europe, and South America. He was affiliated with the Betty Parsons and Sidney Janis galleries in New York and the Galerie Maeght in Paris. A dozen museums and institutions have in-depth collections of his work, and examples are included in the holdings of more than eighty other public collections.

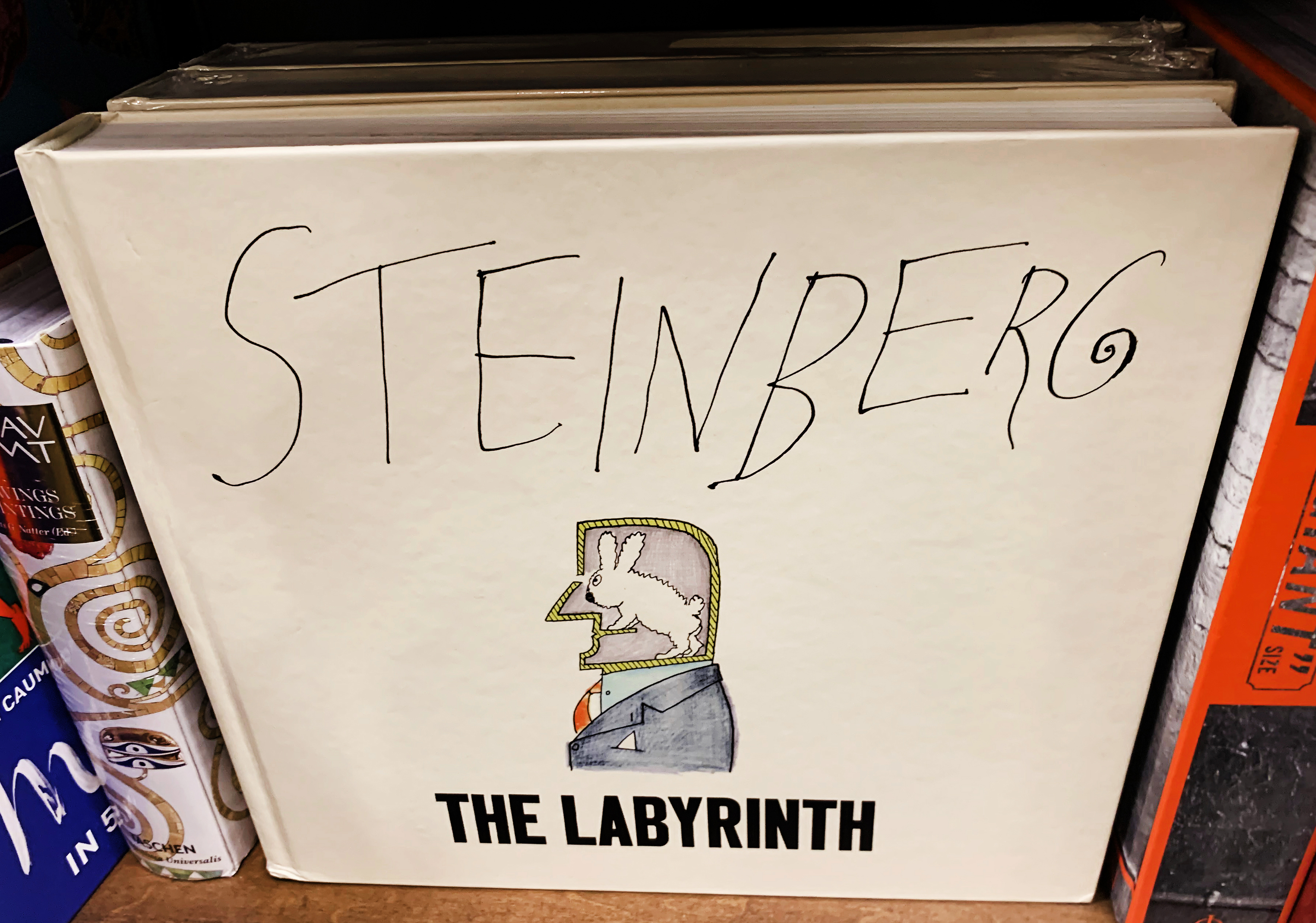
The Labyrinth by Saul Steinberg (1960)

He and Sterne separated in 1960, but remained close friends. However, toward the end of Sterne's life, she called their marriage license “the first of Saul’s phony documents, maybe.”

Steinberg's long, multifaceted career encompassed works in many media and appeared in different contexts. In addition to magazine publications and gallery art, he produced advertising art, photoworks, textiles, stage sets, and murals. Given this many-leveled output, his work is difficult to position within the canons of postwar art history. He himself defined the problem: "I don't quite belong to the art, cartoon or magazine world, so the art world doesn't quite know where to place me."

He is best described as a "modernist without portfolio, constantly crossing boundaries into uncharted visual territory. In subject matter and styles, he made no distinction between high and low art, which he freely conflated in an oeuvre that is stylistically diverse yet consistent in depth and visual imagination."

After Steinberg's death on May 12, 1999, The Saul Steinberg Foundation was established in accordance with the artist's will. The Foundation's mission is "to facilitate the study and appreciation of Saul Steinberg's contribution to 20th-century art" and to "serve as a resource for the international curatorial-scholarly community as well as the general public".

== Bibliography ==
- The Saul Steinberg Foundation website, “Selected Bibliography."
- Joel Smith, with an introduction by Ian Frazier, Steinberg at The New Yorker. New York: Harry N. Abrams, 2005.
- Iain Topliss, The Comic Worlds of Peter Arno, William Steig, Charles Addams, and Saul Steinberg. Baltimore: The Johns Hopkins University Press, 2005.
- Joel Smith, with an introduction by Charles Simic, Saul Steinberg: Illuminations. New Haven and London: Yale University Press, 2006.
- Saul Steinberg: L'Écriture visuelle. Strasbourg: Musée Tomi Ungerer, 2009.
- ’’Saul Steinberg: cartoons’’ New York, Penguin Books, 1947
- Mario Tedeschini Lalli, "Descent from Paradise: Saul Steinberg's Italian Years, 1933-1941." Published in Issues in Contemporary Jewish History, no. 2, October 2011.
- Bair, Deidre. Saul Steinberg: A Biography. Nan A. Talese/Doubleday (2012)
- Corrections to Deirdre Bair, Saul Steinberg: A Biography
- Melissa Renn, Andreas Prinzing, Iain Topliss, et al., Saul Steinberg: The Americans. Cologne: Museum Ludwig, 2013
- Will Norman, Transatlantic Aliens: Modernism, Exile, and Culture in Midcentury America. Baltimore: Johns Hopkins University Press, 2016. Chapter 5, "Saul Steinberg's Vanishing Trick."
