= Bombing of Nuremberg in World War II =

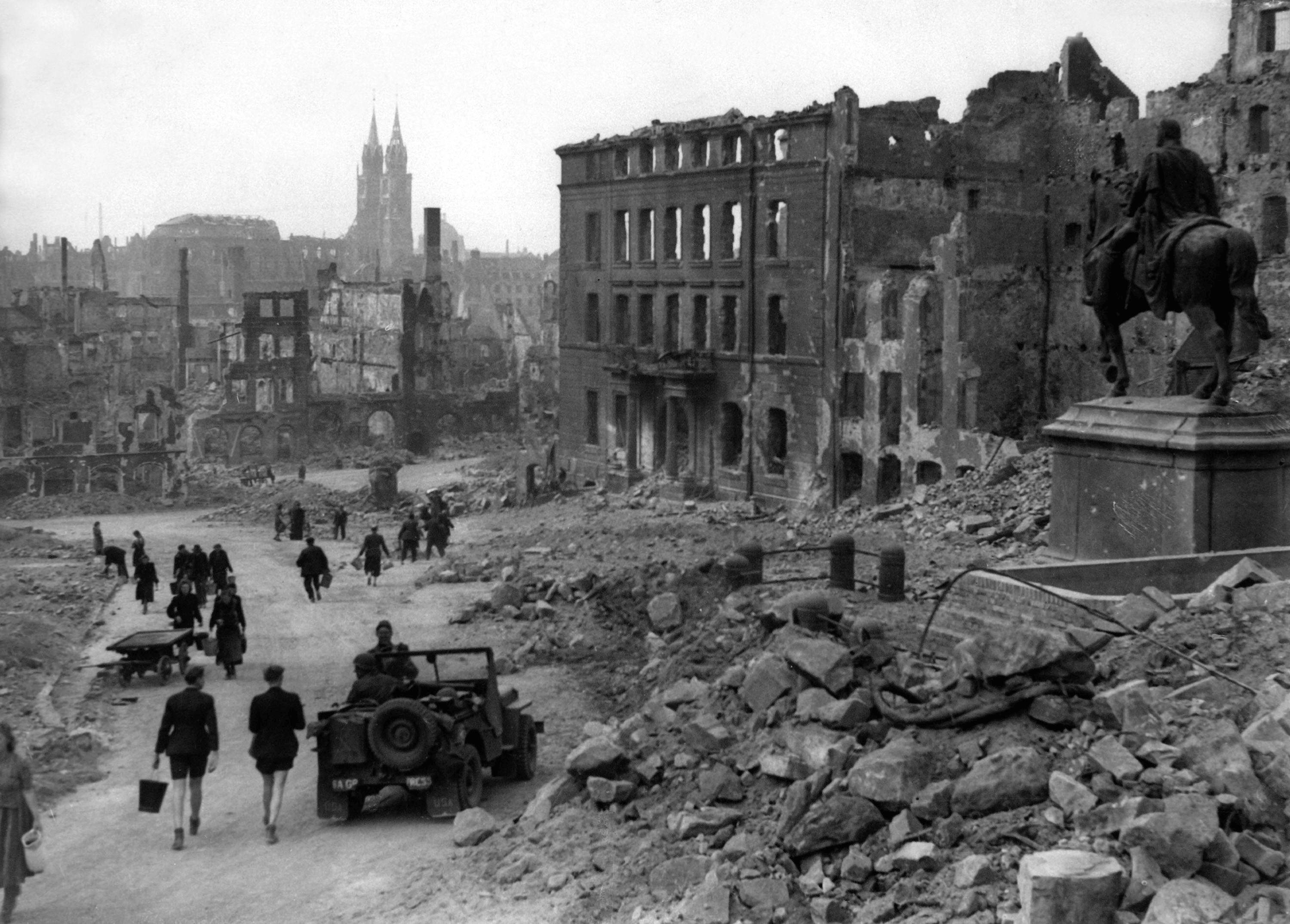
Image of the destroyed old city; in the background the Lorenzkirche (1945)

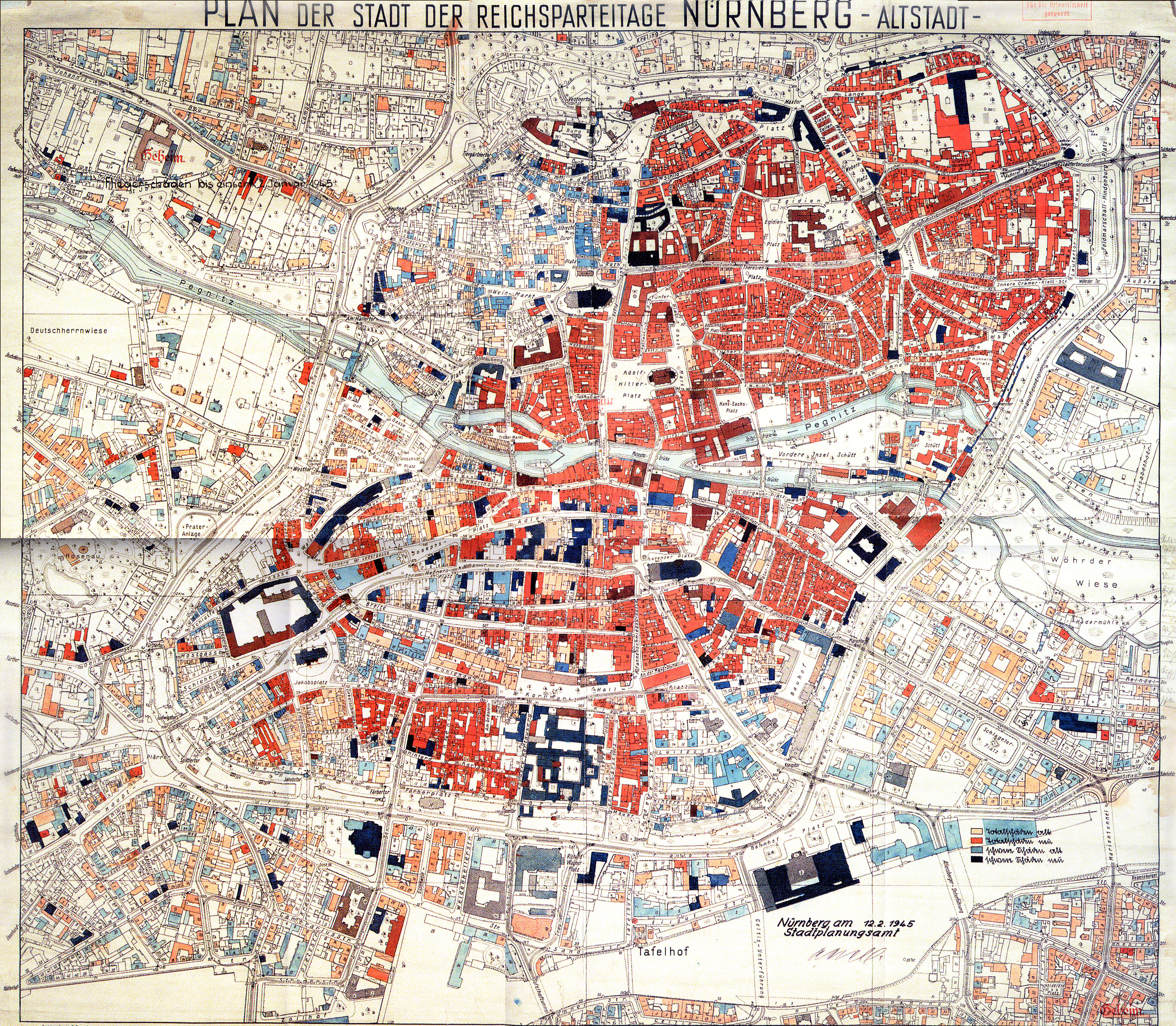
Damages from air raids after 2 January 1945

The bombing of Nuremberg was a series of air raids carried out by allied forces of the Royal Air Force (RAF) and the United States Army Air Forces (USAAF). It caused heavy damage throughout the city from 1940 through 1945. Nuremberg was a favored point of attack for allied bombers because it was a strong economic and infrastructural hub. It also had symbolic importance as the "City of the Nuremberg Rally".

The greatest damage was inflicted on 2 January 1945 when 521 RAF bombers dropped 6,000 high-explosive bombs and one million incendiary devices. More than 1,800 died and 100,000 people lost their homes. Nuremberg's old town was almost completely destroyed, and the city as a whole was badly damaged. After Würzburg, Nuremberg was one of Bavaria's cities that suffered the most damage in the war and was one of the most devastated cities in Germany.

The eastern half of the city (north of the Pegnitz river) was known as the steppe after the destruction and during the clearing of the rubble. The air raids ceased on 11 April 1945. On 20 April, after the Battle of Nuremberg, the city was occupied by units of the 7th US Army.

== Nuremberg as a military target ==
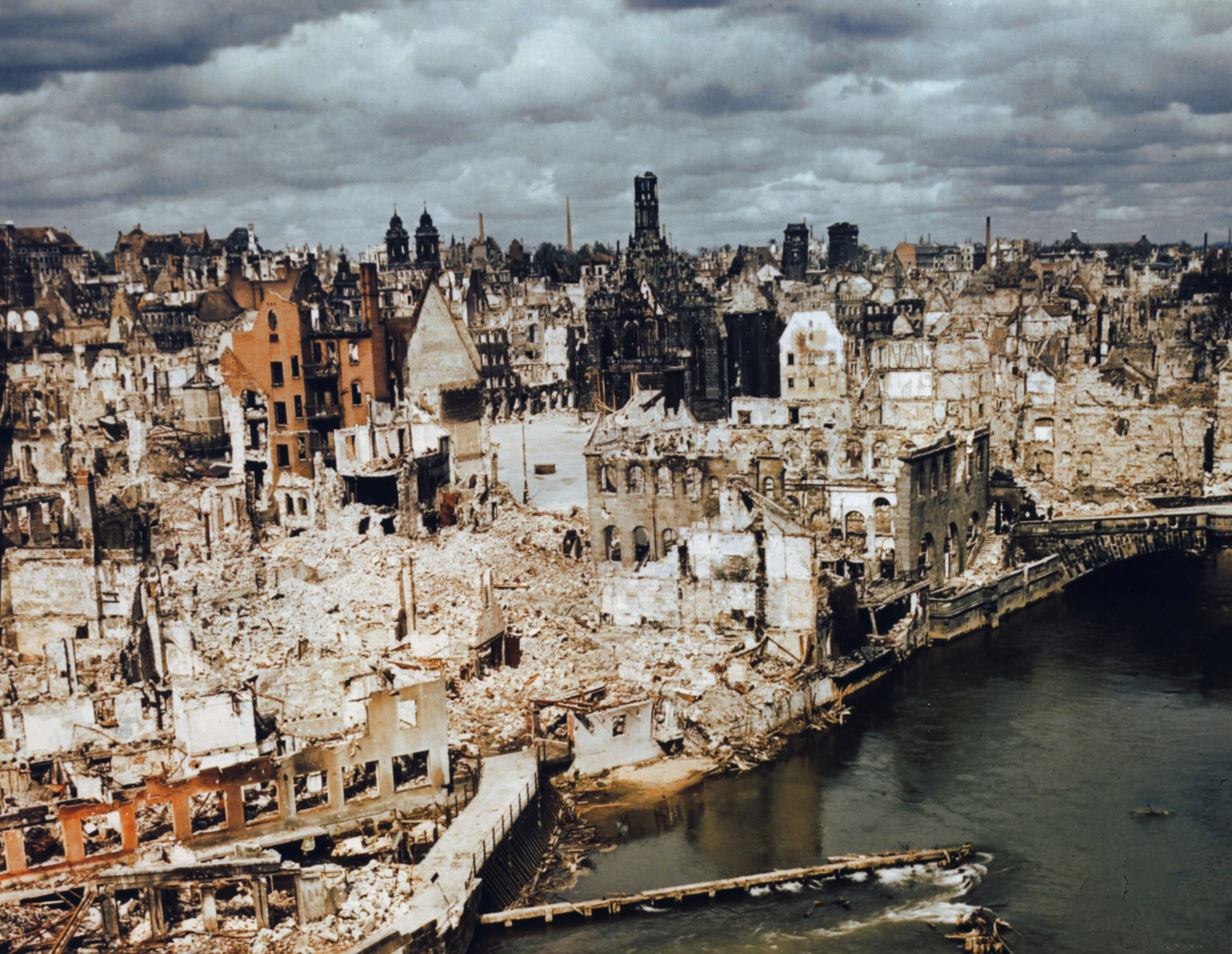
Ruins of Nuremberg,c. 1945

Nuremberg was an important production location for armaments and the densely populated medieval old town was a well-suited destination for the purposes of the area bombing directive of the Royal Air Force (RAF). The attacks would have considerable symbolic effect because Nuremberg was officially nicknamed "City of the Nuremberg Rally" during the Nazi era.

Its inner city had a high proportion of half-timbered houses especially vulnerable to the combination of explosive and incendiary bombs. The purpose was to ignite a firestorm to increase the effect of this weaponry. Daytime attacks on industrial and infrastructure targets were mostly carried out by the technically better equipped US Army Air Forces as part of the division of labor of the Allied air fleets in order to achieve a high degree of accuracy, which was technologically only possible to a limited extent. Nighttime bombardments were mostly flown by the RAF's Pathfinder Force.

The city's old town was most severely affected by the attack of 2 January 1945. Its urban surrounds had numerous military targets. The factories of MAN in the south of the city built diesel engines for submarines and components for Panther tanks. Other important companies were Siemens-Schuckert, TeKaDe, Nüral (Nürnberger Aluminiumwerke, now Federal-Mogul), and Diehl. In addition the bombers targeted the Nuremberg motorcycle industry (Zündapp/Neumeyer, Hercules, Triumph, Victoria) and 120 other armament and companies that employed forced labor as well as the facilities of the German Reichsbahn: the marshaling yard in the south of the city and the main railway lines running over Nuremberg.

== Timeline of the attacks ==
Until 1942, there were only minor attacks. From 1942 to 1944 there was a fight for air supremacy over Germany which was won by the Allies in large parts. From autumn 1944, airfields of the Allies had moved close enough that it was possible to deploy low-flying aircraft. The following table is based on the information provided by G. W. Schramm.

Date	Aircraft	Bomb load(t)	Description of the air raid	Casualties and damages
1940				
7 August			Bombs on Fürth/Burgfarrnbach	
20/21 December			Bombs on Nazi party rally grounds	
1941				
12/13 October	152 RAF bombers, esp. Wellington and Whitley		Only 20 high-explosive and 14 incendiary devices hit target; minor damage to Nuremberg but severe damage to Schwabach	9 casualties; 50 destroyed houses in Schwabach
1942				
28/29 August	RAF bombers		South-west of the city park and the southern city, Alte Kongresshalle/Luitpoldhalle in the Luitpoldarena, die Nuremberg castle	136 casualties; 152 destroyed houses, 220 fires
thereafter	4 air raid warnings			
1943				
25/26 February	337 four-engined RAF bombers		Due to low visibility bombs were dropped on the surrounding Knoblauchsland, northern parts of the city, the Dynamit AG plant in Stadeln/Fürth and the fortified church in Kraftshof	27 casualties; 44 large, 8 medium and 10 minor fires
8/9 March starting 11:00 p.m.	335 four-engined RAF bombers	358 t high-explosive, 412 t incendiary bombs	Southern old town: Mauthalle; Nuremberg Castle, Siemens-Trafowerk, marshaling yard	343 casualties; 171 large, 339 minor and 1746 minor fires; time-bombs
10/11 August 00:48	653 four-engined RAF bombersF: Lancaster, Stirling, Halifax	878 t high-explosive, 878 t incendiary bombs	North, southern old town, Wöhrd; St. Sebald, St. Lorenz; u. a. Germanisches Nationalmuseum, the last remaining hop hall on the Kornmarkt. Fürth, Fischbach and Feucht	585 casualties; 1732 destroyed, 1156 severely damaged 2386 moderately damaged buildings
27/28 August	674 four-engined RAF bombers		Darkness, strong flak and night fighters disturbed the target approach, many bombs fell on southern suburbs. In Nuremberg: Maxfeld, Nordostbahnhof, southern old town, Laufamholz; the companies Neumeyer and MAN	56 casualties; 458 destroyed, 361 moderately damaged buildings and 1704 with minor damages
1944				
25 February 12:47 p.m.	172 USAAF Liberator		Target was Fürther Flugzeugwerk Bachmann von Blumenthal &amp; Co.	138 casualties, 122 injured
31 March	795 RAF bombers: 572 Lancaster, 214 Halifax, 9 Mosquitos	910 t high-explosive, 1176 t incendiary bombs	"The Nuremberg Raid": The attackers suffered heavy losses: 95 bombers were shot down. In Nuremberg the attack was classified as "moderately severe", further damage in the eastern neighboring towns (Röthenbach an der Pegnitz, Behringersdorf, Lauf an der Pegnitz).	In Nuremberg: 74 casualties and 122 injured; 130 destroyed, 879 moderately damaged buildings and 2505 with minor damages
10 April 10:48 a.m.	233 B-17G and 241 USAAF escort fighter planes		Fürth, Nürnberger armament companies: MAN, TEKADE	82 casualties, 366 injured; 211 destroyed, 214 severely damaged, 1365 moderately damaged buildings and 1800 with minor damages
	13 air raid warnings			
3 October 11:15 a.m.	454 USAAF B-17		Targeted were the MAN facilities but low visibility due to clouds. Instead hit by the bombs: Weinstadel, Viatishaus, 62 Patrician houses	353 casualties, 1033 injured; 518 destroyed, 738 severely damaged, 1097 moderately damaged buildings and 4109 with minor damages
19/20 October	263 RAF Lancaster and 7 Mosquitos		Southern city and old town. Gustav-Adolf church, MAN, Siemens, marshaling yard	237 casualties, 10,383 shelterless
	62 air raid warnings			
25/26 November	RAF Mosquitos		Small interference attack, one train and multiple houses hit	over 60 casualties
until 24 December	RAF Mosquitos		Small interference attacks; dubbed "Mosquitos on siren tours" in Britain	
1945				
2 January, evening	514 RAF Lancaster and 7 Mosquitos	1825 t high-explosive, 479 t incendiary bombs	Complete destruction of the Nuremberg old town with irrecoverable damage to the historic building structure. Attacks on MAN, TEKADE, Nüral, Nürnberger Schraubenfabrik	1835 casualties, over 3000 injured, 100,000 shelterless; 4553 destroyed, 2047 severely damaged, 2993 moderately damaged buildings and 7000 with minor damages; 1 conflagration and 2 block fire, 1194 major, 851 medium and 1070 small fires
January and February	RAF Mosquitos		Small interference attacks	
20 February 12:30 p.m.	831 USAAF B-17 and 360 B-24		Already on the approach, the B-24 had to turn around because of thunderstorms. Because of cloud cover over the target the bombs were thrown blind and distributed over the whole city; accumulations at railway facilities and in the southern part of town.	see below
21 February 10:40 a.m.	1205 USAAF bombers		Targeted were the main station and marshaling yards, but Gostenhof and St. Johannis were also hit.	1356 casualties and 70,000 shelterless
February/March			2 interference attacks	
16 March 8:53 p.m.	301 RAF Lancaster und 40 Mosquitos		Severe damages in the southern part of the city: Steinbühl and Galgenhof, St. Peter, Gostenhof; Muggenhof, Thon, Schnepfenreuth and Poppenreuth	517 casualties
19 March			Störangriffe	
5 April	254 USAAF B-17		Targeted were the main station and marshaling yards, but mostly hit were southern residential areas	see below
5 April	72 USAAF B-17		Fürth and Unterschlauersbach air base	197 casualties
8 April	89 USAAF B-24		Targeted was the Bachmann von Blumenthal & Co. air plane factory in Fürth	
5–10 April	Low-flying aircraft		Rail transports, anti-aircraft positions around Zollhaus, railroad repair plant in Gostenhof	
11 April, afternoon	143 RAF bombers		Marshaling yards and surrounding residential areas	74 casualties

== Destruction ==
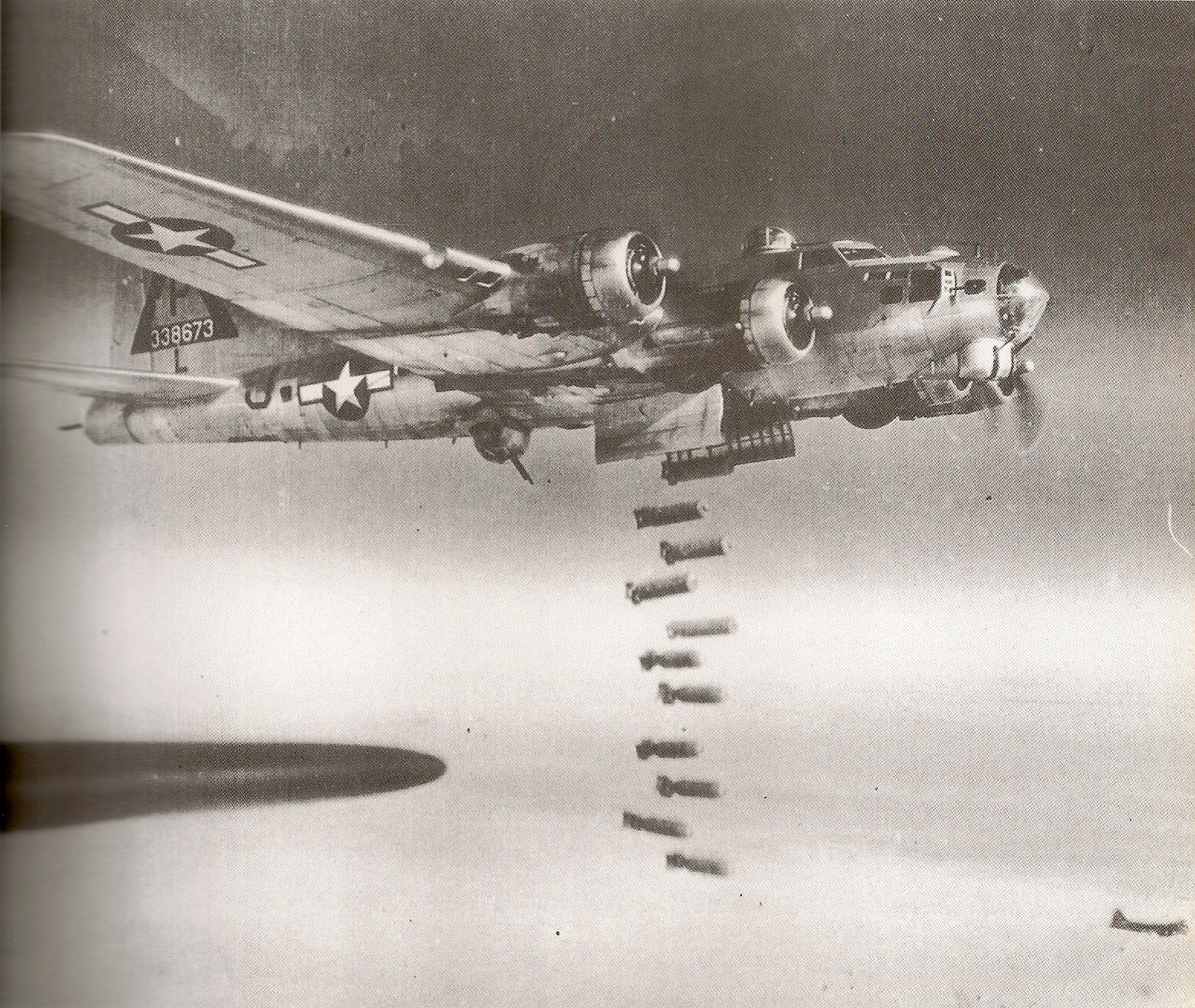
US B-17 via Nuremberg Feb 1945

Nuremberg's old town was largely destroyed. The southern parts of the city, St Johannis and other neighbourhoods were also hit hard. After Cologne, Dortmund and Kassel, Nuremberg had the largest amount of rubble per inhabitant among the major German cities. The population of Nuremberg decreased from 420,349 in 1939 to 195,000 by the end of the war. Half of its dwellings were destroyed, and many others were damaged.

== Reconstruction ==
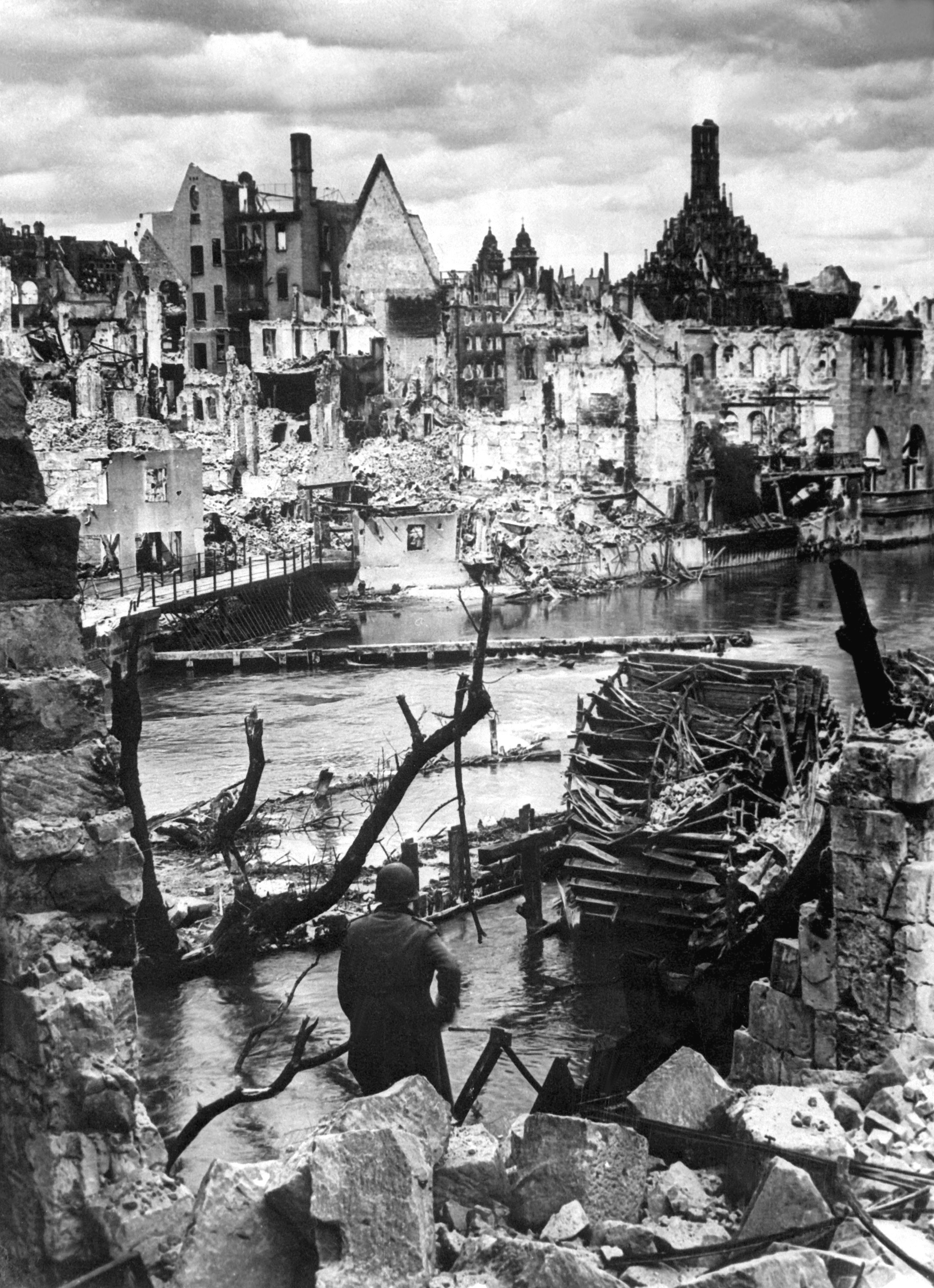
Nuremberg in ruins, summer of 1945

In 1947, ideas for reconstruction were collected in an urban planning competition. The board of trustees for the Reconstruction of Nuremberg (Kuratorium für den Wiederaufbau Nürnbergs) advised the city administration on questions of reconstruction. A simplified reconstruction was agreed upon.

It was at this time that the organisation Old Town Friends Nuremberg (Altstadtfreunde Nürnberg) was set up to advocate a faithful, accurate reconstruction of the old town. The association supports the preservation and restoration of the existing historical old town houses and other architectural monuments in Nuremberg that are worth preserving.

By 1955 most of the reconstruction work had been completed or at least begun. From 1956 to 1960 the Nuremberg Town Hall (Wolffscher Bau and Rathaussaalbau) was rebuilt. Until 1957 the St Sebaldus church was repaired. The largest restoration project was the city walls of Nuremberg with its 4-kilometre-long (2.5 mi) double wall and the moat.

The Katharinenkloster Nuremberg, today called Katherinenruine, which was completely destroyed during the air raids in 1945, was not rebuilt but secured as a ruin in 1970/71. Since then it has served as a memorial to the war and as a venue for events.

== Bombs found after World War II ==
Since the end of the war, unexploded bombs have been, and continue to be, found in Nuremberg, as throughout Germany. They are often discovered by chance. The explosive ordnance clearance service (Kampfmittelräumdienst) is responsible for defusing aircraft bombs, sometimes ordering large-scale evacuations before doing so.

== See also ==
- Nuremberg
- Battle of Nuremberg (1945)
- List of air operations during the Battle of Europe

== General references ==
- Die Zerstörung (2nd ed.). Verlag A. Hofmann. 1988. ISBN 3-87191-124-0. OL 57892295M.
- Bomben auf Nürnberg. Luftangriffe 1940 - 1945. Hugendubel Heinrich. 1988. ISBN 978-3880343948.
- Der Luftkrieg gegen Nürnberg. Stadt Nürnberg. 2004. ISBN 3-87707-634-3.
- Michael Diefenbacher, Rudolf Endres (Hrsg.): Stadtlexikon Nürnberg. 2., verbesserte Auflage. W. Tümmels Verlag, Nürnberg 2000, ISBN 3-921590-69-8 (online).
- Martin Middlebrook: Die Nacht, in der die Bomber starben. Der Angriff auf Nürnberg und seine Folgen für den Luftkrieg ("The Nuremberg raid"), Ullstein Verlag, Frankfurt am Main 1979, ISBN 3-548-33005-3
- Peter Schneider: 30./31. März 1944. Tod am Meisbach: Absturz der Lancaster ND441 bei Dotzlar. In: Wittgenstein. Blätter des Wittgensteiner Heimatvereins, 2007, pp. 130.

== Sources ==
- Eichhorn, Ernst; Schramm, Georg Wolfgang; Görl, Otto Peter (1990). 3x Nürnberg. Nürnberg: A. Hofmann. ISBN 978-3-87191-124-8. OCLC 611919428.
  - Schramm, Georg Wolfgang. "Die Zerstörung". In Eichhorn, Schramm & Görl (1990).
  - Görl, Otto Peter. "Der Wiederaufbau". In Eichhorn, Schramm & Görl (1990).
- Eisenack, Gabi (2 January 2013). "Nürnberger erinnert sich an Bombenangriff vom 2. Januar 1945". Nordbayern (in German). Nürnberger Presse.
- Friedrich, Jörg (2002). Der Brand: Deutschland im Bombenkrieg 1940–1945 (in German) (11th ed.). Munich: Propyläen Verlag. ISBN 3-549-07165-5. LCCN 2003425287. OCLC 186484412. OL 26639576M. Wikidata Q131292409.
- Martin, Eleonore (2007). "Dr. Hellmut Kunstmann". Fränkische Schweiz - Verein e.V (in German). Archived from the original on 30 December 2007.
- Pelke, Nikolas (12 June 2017). "'Es ist wirklich ein magisches Ort'". Hilpoltsteiner Kurier (in German). Archived from the original on 5 December 2018.
- Willy Prölß, Clemens Wachter. Wiederaufbau (in German). pp. 1178–1179.
- Georg Wolfgang Schramm, Udo Winkel. Rüstungsindustrie (in German). pp. 915.
