= Bombing of Bamberg =

Series of World War II aerial bombing attacks on Bamberg, Germany

Bombing of Bamberg during World War II
- Part of Strategic bombing during World War II
Date	1944 – 1945
Location	Bamberg
Result	4.4% of the city destroyed, 378 deaths

Belligerents
United Kingdom; United States	Germany

Strength
9 aerial bombing attacks	

The bombings of Bamberg are a series of British and American aerial bombing attacks on the city of Bamberg during World War II. A total of nine attacks were carried out by the Royal Air Force (RAF) and United States Army Air Forces (AAF) in 1944 and 1945 as part of the Allied campaign of strategic bombing of Germany. However, unlike nearby Nuremberg, the city itself escaped major damage. Today, the historical city centre is a UNESCO Heritage Site.

== Background ==
Unlike the nearby industrial hub of Nuremberg, which was also an important city propaganda-wise for Adolf Hitler and the Nazi Party due to the huge yearly propaganda rallies held there each year, Bamberg was strategically irrelevant to the Allies and escaped any bombing raids for the majority of the war. In 1939, the city had a total of 59,466 inhabitants.

== Attacks ==
The first attack on Bamberg happened on 31 March 1944, by British forces. However, the city was not a deliberate target: the RAF dropped unused bombs on the urban area after an attack on Nuremberg, causing minor damage to two houses on Kirschäckerstraße. On 2 January 1945, the RAF dropped unused or emergency bombs once more on the urban centre of Bamberg after an attack on Nuremberg, killing one and injuring several people. The attack also caused significant damage to houses in the Hainstraße, Sodenstraße and Schützenstraße. Another bombardment occurred on 16 January when an AAF bomber dropped its unused payload on the city, damaging houses on Hainstraße and Ottostraße.

On 14 February, AAF airplanes targeted the railway station with high-explosive and incendiary bombs, destroying or damaging residential buildings between the Moosstraße, Zollnerstraße and Pödeldorfer Straße and killing 94 people, including many schoolchildren waiting for their bus at the nearby bus station. The reason for the attack was that not all Allied aircraft had reached the actual target of Dresden due to bad weather and chose Bamberg as an alternative target.

However, the biggest and deadliest bombing happened over a week later on 22 February 1945. In the afternoon, AAF planes attacked the Bamberg railway station and surroundings with bombs. Because of poor visibility, the bombs were also dropped over residential houses, killing a total of 216 civilians and causing many houses between Oberer Stephansberg and Oberer Kaulberg to be either damaged or destroyed as a result. The inner city was also hit, particularly in the Obstmarkt, Lange Straße, Grüner Markt and Keßlerstraße. Three significant landmarks in the city were hit: the Church of the Redeemer (Erlöserkirche) at the Kunigundendamm which was almost completely destroyed (only the tower remained), the historic Altane on the Grüner Markt and the Alte Maut (lit. 'Old Toll'). A follow-up attack was planned for 23 February, but ultimately cancelled due to bad weather. After that, low-flying Allied aircraft continued to attack Bamberg, threatening large gatherings of people and sometimes also dropping leaflets mocking National Socialism and its propaganda. Another 67 people died as a result of these attacks.

By then, Bamberg was declared a front area within the Jura Line by the Nazi commanders, in order to protect the city of Nuremberg for propagandistic reasons. As a result, Volkssturm units, anti-tank barriers and anti-tank ditches were also meant to stop the advance of the Americans. In line with Hitler's Nero Decree, the plan was to destroy important German infrastructure before handing them over to the Allies. Such plans were also put in place for Bamberg, but never carried out. Nevertheless, German troops blew up all the bridges in Bamberg between 10 and 13 April in order to stop the Allied advance or to at least prevent them from obtaining any useful infrastructure. Despite the destruction of the bridges and a fanatical general of the Waffen-SS, American forces entered Bamberg with little resistance and by 14 April had taken it over fully.

== After the war ==
Besides Bamberg being a strategically irrelevant target, there were also other reasons why the city was not heavily destroyed by Allied bombs. Church representatives like Auxiliary bishop Landgraf negotiated for surrender, and the confusion of the military command structures at the tail end of the war thanks to the dissolution of the Wehrmacht and party hierarchy also likely played an important part in the city being largely spared. A memorial stone has since been erected at the E.T.A. Hoffmann school, and an annual commemoration is held to remind everyone of the air raid on 22 February 1945.

On 22 February 2015, 70 years after the attack on the city, an exhibition titled Spared from war? The end of the Second World War in Bamberg in 1945 was held in the Stadtarchiv Bamberg. Around 100 historical recordings were displayed, showing the levels of destruction of the 22 February attack.

== Destruction ==
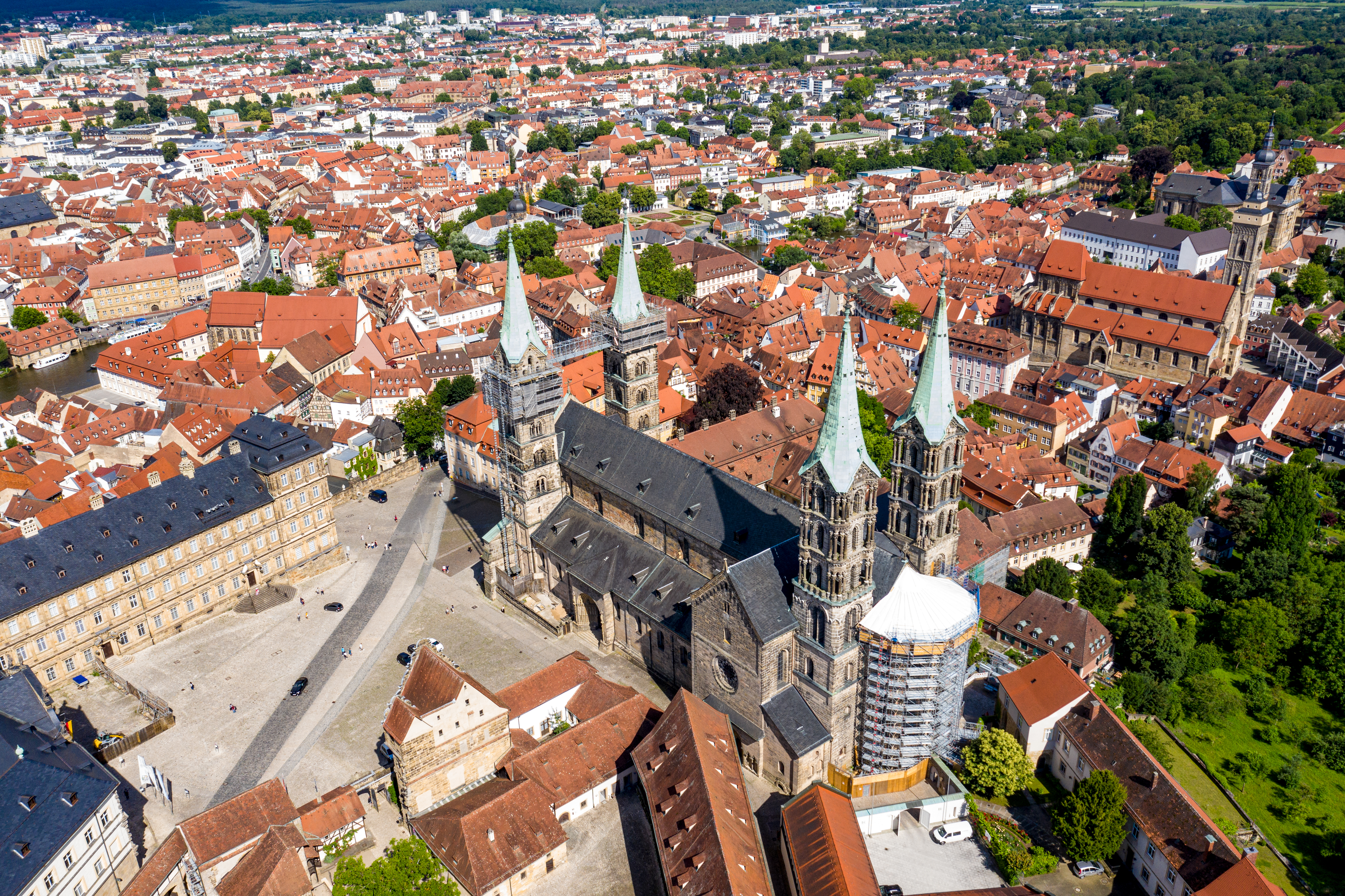
Aerial view of the historical city centre of Bamberg in 2020. The city centre is a UNESCO Heritage Site.

After the war ended, a reconstruction commission was put in place in 1946 by the city with little influence, putting an emphasis on traditional architecture. In 1947, the first reconstruction efforts began. Bamberg station was eventually restored to its original state, as was the Erlöserkirche in 1950. The houses that were damaged during the bombing attacks were reconstructed in the original style, predominantly in the inner city, while the destroyed houses were built anew in the post-war style typical for that time, putting an emphasis on traditional styles. Most houses around the railway station were however not rebuilt, nor were any of the historical buildings like the Altane and Alte Maut and the bridges gracing the rivers of the city, with the exception of the Obere Brücke near the historic city hall. 362 buildings were destroyed in total, with another 4000 being damaged. 2500 apartments were lightly hit and another 1700 of the 16,000 apartments were severely damaged during World War II. In total, 4.4% of the city ended up being destroyed. Besides the material damage, a total of 378 civilians also died during the bombing attacks.

== See also ==
- Strategic bombing during World War II
- Bombing of Nuremberg in World War II
