= Jörg Friedrich (author) =

German author and historian (born 1944)

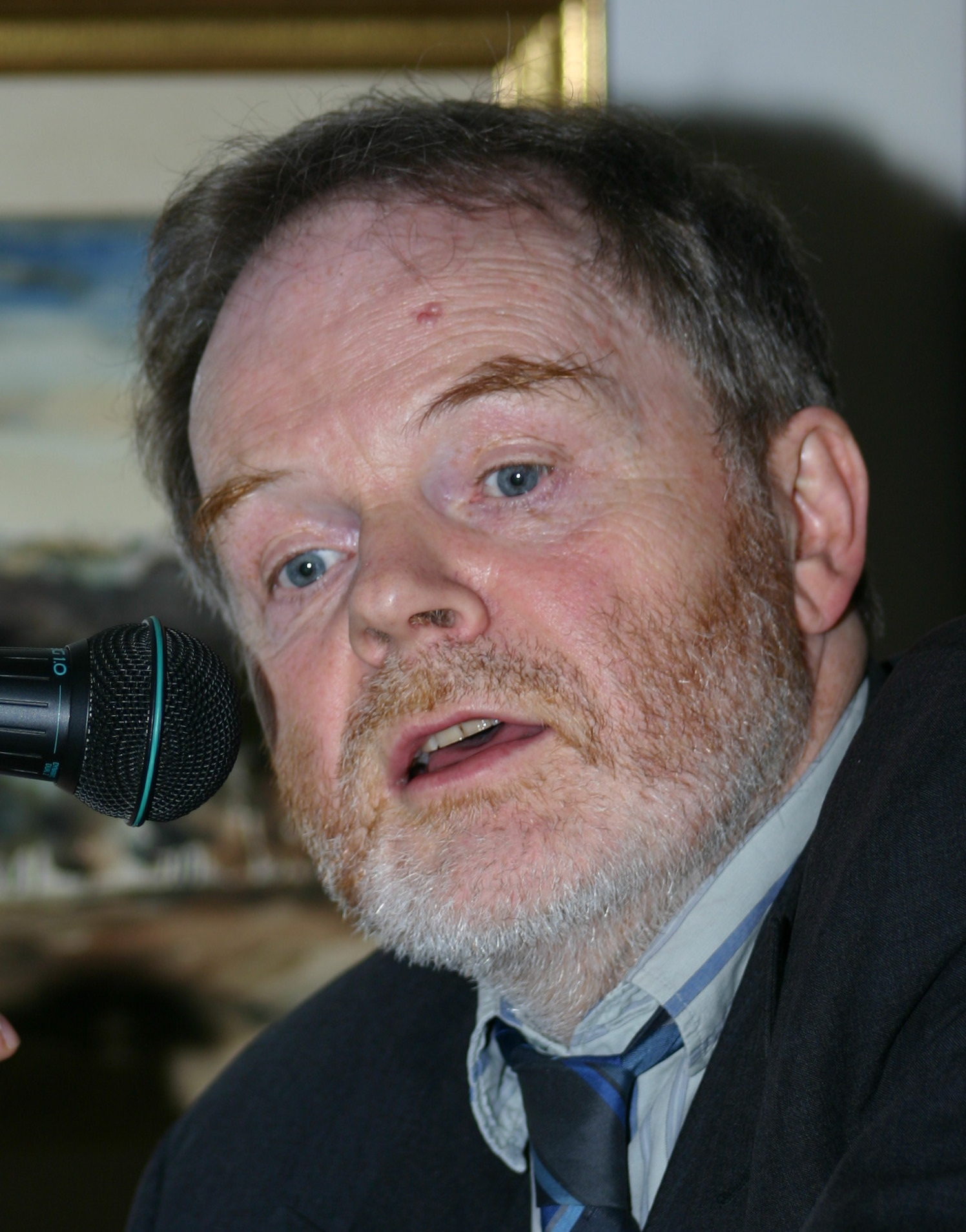
Jörg Friedrich (Historian)

Jörg Friedrich (sometimes spelled Joerg or Jorg in English) (born 17 August 1944 in Kitzbühel) is a German author and historian. Friedrich is best known for his publication The Fire (2002, German: Der Brand), in which he portrays the Allied bombing of civilian targets during World War II as systematic and in many ways pointless mass murder. An English translation was published in 2006 by Columbia University Press and met with widespread critical approval. For example, the New York Times said it "describes in stark, unrelenting and very literary detail what happened in city after city as the Allies dropped 80 million incendiary bombs on Germany..... There is... an edginess to Friedrich's writing and commentary, an emotional power."

Friedrich was formerly considered a left-wing antiwar activist and described as a student Trotskyist. His books have sold hundreds of thousands of copies in Germany, and some have also been translated into English, Dutch, French and many other languages. He is well connected in German political and military circles and is a friend of former German Chancellor Helmut Kohl. He has published interviews with Rudolf Bahro and Raul Hilberg when their books were published. His new book "14/18 Der Weg nach Versailles" focusses on the First World War.

For his work The Law of War: The German Army in Russia Friedrich has been awarded an honorary doctorate by the University of Amsterdam in the Netherlands.

== Life and career ==
Born in Kitzbühel in 1944, he spent his childhood in Essen. Jörg Friedrich became a Trotskyist and, during the Vietnam War, an antiwar protester. Following thereon, he began to write books on the history of the war in Germany and work as an independent historian, researching postwar justice and the Nuremberg Trials. His books have always been controversial and have largely sold through this controversial analysis and the publicity surrounding them.

== Criticism of Friedrich's position ==
As a historian who has written strongly on the horrors committed by the German state under the Nazis, Friedrich's position has always been assumed to be anti-Nazi with antiwar tendencies focused towards Germany's taking responsibility for its actions during the war.

"his previous work examining Wehrmacht crimes and Nazi justice enables him to approach the subject without risking automatic dismissal as a right-wing apologist." (from the Peifer review of Der Brand)

Friedrich admits that Germany initiated bombing of civilians in the UK by bombing London, although he claims the first raid was accidental, thereby leaving Britain as the first nation to deliberately bomb nonmilitary targets. This entirely ignores the German bombing of English cities during the First World War, using Zeppelin and other rigid airships. In April 1937, during the Spanish Civil War (1936–1939), German airplanes bombed the town of Guernica, which had no military use or value.

Less well-known bombings, such as that of the Polish town of Wieluń within the first two hours of the war and prior to any attack on Germany, either by air or land, are left out. Friedrich mentions the British use of explosive weapons followed by incendiary, a mixture designed to create large fires. He also mentions that the technique to create firestorms was a German development first seen in the bombing against British cities, such as the Coventry Blitz (14 November 1940) and the Second Great Fire of London (29/30 December 1940).

Friedrich was persuaded to publish his book of Dresden photographs by former German Chancellor Helmut Kohl, with the condition that equivalent photographs of Polish and British victims should also be shown.

Friedrich has specifically attempted to claim the position of an objective historian, making no judgement about the morality of Allied bombing. Many reviews of his books have pointed out that the language Friedrich uses in his books, with words such as "Einsatzgruppen" (task force in English) used to describe allied pilots and "crematoria" (as in the crematoria of Auschwitz) to describe the air raid shelters in which Dresden residents died.

One explanation offered for Friedrich's recent books and their choice of topics is that he maintains strong antiwar feelings, and with the looming War in Iraq and other global conflicts, he wanted to join in the general German antiwar feelings and implicitly criticise the policy of attacks on foreign nonmilitary targets in Iraq. Friedrich has himself rejected this explanation, stating that he is "dismayed that The Fire has bolstered the pacifist argument against German participation in an Iraq war".

== Other related historians ==
Other German historians closer to the mainstream of historical research have also covered the suffering of the German people during the war. The bombing of Dresden had been covered in detail by Götz Bergander prior to Friedrich's book.

== Influence on German and international debate on the war ==
Friedrich's books have not been well received by some media outlets in Germany. ARD, a public television channel, wrote off "the Fire" ("Der Brand") as a "provocation", and Süddeutsche Zeitung recommended throwing his latest book, Places of Fire, directly into the garbage bin.

Even with these strong criticisms, Friedrich has had considerable public success. The Fire was serialised in the German tabloid Bild and has had a serious influence on German national debate. Friedrich has claimed that this has meant that German civilians who had never previously talked about their wartime experiences have begun to tell about this phase in history, which was previously documented primarily from the point of view of influence on the war. At other times, revision of the outlook on the war has taken place, with Klaus Naumann, a former NATO General and friend of Friedrich's, saying, during a joint promotional interview with Friedrich, that he now doubted the legality and military need for Churchill's decision to attack Dresden, thereby implying that the attacks were war crimes.

Both in Germany and abroad, neo-Nazi groups have seized on the book as proving that the air war was begun by the UK. Claims that the book shows that bombings of German towns in 1940 were the first attacks on civilians of the war, based on the omission of attacks in Poland, are common. The equating of the bombing of Dresden with the Holocaust is made explicit and even inverted (?), with the actions towards Jews described as a decision of Hitler for strategic reasons whilst the needless incineration of hundreds of thousands of defenseless German civilians is reappraised as a war crime and a massacre.

It was not until 15 May 1940, two days after the Rotterdam Blitz, that the British abandoned their policy of using aerial bombing only against military targets and against infrastructure, such as ports and railways west of the Rhine, which were of direct military importance. It is also alleged that Rotterdam was bombed by mistake.

== Bibliography ==
- 14/18. Der Weg nach Versailles. Jörg Friedrich. Propyläen Verlag, Berlin 2014. ISBN 978-3-549-07317-9

The author describes World War I as breakdown of civilization that transformed Europe into a battlefield on which law, humanity, Christian values, political common sense and economic reason were trampled upon on all sides.

- Yalu. An den Ufern des dritten Weltkrieges. Jörg Friedrich. Propyläen Verlag, Munich 2007. ISBN 978-3-549-07338-4

The author discusses the meaning of the Korean War as a pathway to World War III.

- The Fire: The Bombing of Germany, 1940–1945. Jörg Friedrich. Translated by Allison Brown. Columbia University Press, New York, 2006. ISBN 978-0-231-13380-7

The English translation contains a new afterword by the author "for American and British readers".

- Brandstätten (2003) (Places of Fire / Cities of Fire).

Friedrich's next book reproduces photographs taken by municipal authorities of German civilians burned to death in the firebomb raids. It is much more graphic than The Fire. The book created a sense of revulsion among reviewers; even Friedrich said "no normal person would want to gaze upon these photos." It has never been translated into English and is unavailable outside Germany and Austria.

- Jörg Friedrich (2002), Der Brand: Deutschland im Bombenkrieg 1940–1945 (in German), Munich: Propyläen Verlag, ISBN 3-549-07165-5, LCCN 2003425287, OCLC 186484412, OL 26639576M, Wikidata Q131292409

The book which brought Friedrich to fame, and has sold over 186,000 copies, covering the bombing of German cities. Starting with technology and mechanisms but then concentration on effect on the ground and the horror of bombing for the German civilians trapped in it. See reviews below.

- Das Gesetz des Krieges: Das deutsche Heer in Russland, 1941 bis 1945: der Prozess gegen das Oberkommando der Wehrmacht, (The rules of war: The German Army in Russia, 1941 to 1945, the trial of the Wehrmacht High Command.) Jörg Friedrich, Piper, ISBN 3-492-03116-1

A book including strong criticism of the way that the Nuremberg trials have come to be perceived in Germany, placing blame at least partly on the American instigators of the trials.

- Freispruch für die Nazi-Justiz: Die Urteile gegen NS-Richter seit 1948: eine Dokumentation (Rororo aktuell). (Acquittal for Nazi-Justice: The sentencing of NS-Judges since 1948.) Jörg Friedrich, Rowohlt, 1983. ISBN 3-499-15348-3

== Reviews ==
Due to the level of controversy it has raised, a number of reviews of the German edition of The Fire have been written in English and published in English language journals and/or made available on the Internet. These reviews, made shortly after the publication of the book and prior to Friedrich's public statements, have tended to treat the inaccuracies and omissions in Friedrich's books as carelessness, although criticism of the language used has been almost universal.

Comparison of reviews made in Germany with those in the U.S. and the UK is also interesting. Some of the differences may be seen as being due to different points of view; however, specific aspects of the book (for example, the most commonly mentioned failure to provide context) are reliably mentioned in English language reviews whilst being included strongly in some German reviews and missing entirely in others.

- Review: Der Brand: Deutschland im Bombenkrieg, 1940-1945, Douglas Peifer, Air and Space Power Chronicles, Spring 2004

Peifer provides a detailed review of the book, which finds that it is "Highly effective as a literary dirge and lamentation, it comes up short when judged by the standards of the history discipline". Perhaps more importantly he states that the language is "deliberately provocative", that the book's unclear chronology can be misleading and that the lack of clear references included makes it unverifiable. Even given these flaws, Peifer finds that "for those willing to make the effort, reading the piece is worthwhile".

- Review of Jörg Friedrich, Der Brand. Deutschland im Bombenkrieg 1940-1945; A Narrative of Loss, Joerg Arnold, Department of History, University of Southampton,

Perhaps best summarised by its final line, "As a narrative of loss, Der Brand succeeds like few other texts, but as a historical treatment of the allied air war, it is seriously deficient." this review analyses in particular the use of sources within Friedrich's work and also his refusal to apply analysis to the reasons for the bombing. A particularly strong criticism is in Arnold's contrast between Friedrich's overt claim that the bombing had nothing to do with the holocaust and his implicit linkage of the two subjects through his use of the language of the holocaust to describe the effects of the bombings; however, Arnold fails to clarify what exactly he means with 'language of the holocaust' and why it should not be used in relation to atrocities perpetrated against Germans.

- Jörg Friedrich: Der Brand, Franz Kaessl, Öbib online (German Language).

From its opening sentence "The fate of German civilians in the Second World War was treated as a taboo topic for many decades", this review contrasts strongly with most English language reviews. It points to the example of Günter Grass as an author recently discovered the suffering of the war, whilst reviews elsewhere have claimed that Grass's work of the 1960s is actually a far more powerful portrait of the effects of wars on civilians. In the end the review concludes that the book should give a new view on history, not a new assignment of blame.

- The Destruction of Germany, Ian Buruma, in The New York Review of Books
- In a footnote to his article "Targeting the city: Debates and silences about the aerial bombing of World War II", published in the International Review of the Red Cross, Charles Maier (Leverett Saltonstall Professor of History at Harvard University) collates several reviews of Der Brand:
  See the excellent reviews submitted to the H-German network by Joerg Arnold, 3 November 2003, and Douglas Peifer, 4 November 2003, which appropriately address, I believe, the strengths and weaknesses of this work — Peifer's with more emphasis on the military and political issues, Arnold's with greater emphasis on the moral and conceptual problems. Others have also indicated the deficiencies of the book as a scholarly source. See for instance Horst Boogs’ summary list of errors in his contribution to Ein Volk von Opfern? Die neue Debatte um den Bombenkrieg 1940-45, Rowohlt, Berlin, 2003. Obviously many issues are contentious in this debate. The most parochial issues are those that concern historians as such. To what extent can the historian merely report or dissect the differing positions without engaging his own sense of moral judgment? Second, what sort of rhetoric is legitimate in a historical account?

The review on H-German network by Joerg Arnold is online.
