= Ernst Nolte =

German historian (1923–2016)

- Born: 11 January 1923; Witten, Germany
- Died: 18 August 2016 (aged 93); Berlin, Germany
- Occupations: Philosopher, historian
- Known for: Articulating a theory of generic fascism as "resistance to transcendence"; his involvement in the Historikerstreit debate
- Spouse: Annedore Mortier
- Children: Georg Nolte
- Awards: Hanns Martin Schleyer Prize (1985); Konrad Adenauer Prize (2000); Gerhard Löwenthal Honor Award (2011)

Academic background
- Education: University of Münster; University of Berlin; University of Freiburg (BA, PhD); University of Cologne (Dr. phil. hab.)
- Doctoral advisor: Eugen Fink (PhD advisor); Theodor Schieder (Dr. phil. hab. advisor)
- Other advisor: Martin Heidegger

Academic work
- Institutions: University of Marburg (1965–1973); Free University of Berlin (since 1973, emeritus since 1991)

Ernst Nolte (11 January 1923 – 18 August 2016) was a German historian and philosopher. Nolte's major interest was the comparative studies of fascism and communism (cf. Comparison of Nazism and Stalinism). Originally trained in philosophy, he was professor emeritus of modern history at the Free University of Berlin, where he taught from 1973 until his 1991 retirement. He was previously a professor at the University of Marburg from 1965 to 1973. He was best known for his seminal work Fascism in Its Epoch, which received widespread acclaim when it was published in 1963. Nolte was a prominent academic from the early 1960s and was involved in many controversies related to the interpretation of the history of fascism and communism, including the Historikerstreit in the late 1980s. In later years, Nolte focused on Islamism and "Islamic fascism".

Nolte received several awards, including the Hanns Martin Schleyer Prize and the Konrad Adenauer Prize. He was the father of the legal scholar and judge of the International Court of Justice Georg Nolte.

== Early life ==
Nolte was born in Witten, Westphalia, Germany to a Roman Catholic family. Nolte's parents were Heinrich Nolte, a school rector, and Anna (née Bruns) Nolte. According to Nolte in a 28 March 2003 interview with French newspaper Eurozine, his first encounter with communism occurred when he was 7 years old in 1930, when he read in a doctor's office a German translation of a Soviet children's book attacking the Catholic Church, which angered him.

In 1941, Nolte was excused from military service because of a deformed hand, and he studied Philosophy, Philology and Greek at the Universities of Münster, Berlin, and Freiburg. At Freiburg, Nolte was a student of Martin Heidegger, whom he acknowledges as a major influence. From 1944 onwards, Nolte was a close friend of the Heidegger family, and when in 1945 the professor feared arrest by the French, Nolte provided him with food and clothing for an attempted escape. Eugen Fink was another professor who influenced Nolte. After 1945 when Nolte received his BA in philosophy at Freiburg, he worked as a Gymnasium ('high school') teacher. In 1952, he received a PhD in philosophy at Freiburg for his thesis Selbstentfremdung und Dialektik im deutschen Idealismus und bei Marx (transl. Self-alienation and the Dialectic in German Idealism and Marx). Subsequently, Nolte began studies in Zeitgeschichte ('contemporary history'). He published his Habilitationsschrift awarded at the University of Cologne, Der Faschismus in seiner Epoche (transl. fascism in its epoch), as a book in 1963. Between 1965 and 1973, Nolte worked as a professor at the University of Marburg, and from 1973 to 1991 at the Free University of Berlin.

Nolte married Annedore Mortier and they had a son, Georg Nolte, now a professor of international law at Humboldt University of Berlin. Besides his native German, professor Nolte was fluent in English and Italian.

== Fascism in Its Epoch ==
Nolte came to notice with his 1963 book Der Faschismus in seiner Epoche (Fascism in Its Epoch; translated into English in 1965 as The Three Faces of Fascism), in which he argued that fascism arose as a form of resistance to and a reaction against modernity. Nolte's basic hypothesis and methodology were deeply rooted in the German "philosophy of history" tradition, a form of intellectual history which seeks to discover the "metapolitical dimension" of history. The "metapolitical dimension" is considered to be the history of grand ideas functioning as profound spiritual powers, which infuse all levels of society with their force. In Nolte's opinion, only those with training in philosophy can discover the "metapolitical dimension", and those who use normal historical methods miss this dimension of time. Using the methods of phenomenology, Nolte subjected German Nazism, Italian Fascism, and the French Action Française movements to a comparative analysis. Nolte's conclusion was that fascism was the great anti-movement: it was anti-liberal, anti-communist, anti-capitalist, and anti-bourgeois. In Nolte's view, fascism was the rejection of everything the modern world had to offer and was an essentially negative phenomenon. In a Hegelian dialectic, Nolte argued that the Action Française was the thesis, Italian Fascism was the antithesis, and German National Socialism the synthesis of the two earlier fascist movements.

Nolte argued that fascism functioned at three levels, namely in the world of politics as a form of opposition to Marxism, at the sociological level in opposition to bourgeois values, and in the "metapolitical" world as "resistance to transcendence" ("transcendence" in German can be translated as the "spirit of modernity"). Nolte defined the relationship between fascism and Marxism as such:

Fascism is anti-Marxism which seeks to destroy the enemy by the evolvement of a radically opposed and yet related ideology and by the use of almost identical and yet typically modified methods, always, however within the unyielding framework of national self-assertion and autonomy.

Nolte defined "transcendence" as a "metapolitical" force comprising two types of change. The first type, "practical transcendence", manifesting in material progress, technological change, political equality, and social advancement, comprises the process by which humanity liberates itself from traditional, hierarchical societies in favor of societies where all men and women are equal. The second type is "theoretical transcendence", the striving to go beyond what exists in the world towards a new future, eliminating traditional fetters imposed on the human mind by poverty, backwardness, ignorance, and class. Nolte himself defined "theoretical transcendence" as such:

Theoretical transcendence may be taken to mean the reaching out of the mind beyond what exists and what can exist toward an absolute whole; in a broader sense this may be applied to all that goes beyond, that releases man from the confines of the everyday world, and which, as an 'awareness of the horizon', makes it possible for him to experience the world as a whole.

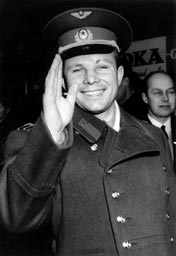
The flight of Yuri Gagarin around the earth in 1961 was used by Nolte in his 1963 book Der Faschismus in seiner Epoche as an example of "transcendence".

Nolte cited the flight of Yuri Gagarin in 1961 as an example of "practical transcendence", of how humanity was pressing forward in its technological development and rapidly acquiring powers traditionally thought to be only the province of the gods. Drawing upon the work of Max Weber, Friedrich Nietzsche, and Karl Marx, Nolte argued that the progress of both types of "transcendence" generates fear as the older world is swept aside by a new world, and that these fears led to fascism. Nolte wrote that:

The most central of Maurras's ideas have been seen to penetrate to this level. By 'monotheism' and 'anti-nature' he did not imply a political process: he related these terms to the tradition of Western philosophy and religion, and left no doubt that for him they were not only adjuncts of Rousseau's notion of liberty, but also of the Christian Gospels and Parmenides' concept of being. It is equally obvious that he regarded the unity of world economics, technology, science and emancipation merely as another and more recent form of 'anti-nature'. It was not difficult to find a place for Hitler ideas as a cruder and more recent expression of this schema. Maurras' and Hitler's real enemy was seen to be 'freedom towards the infinite' which, intrinsic in the individual and a reality in evolution, threatens to destroy the familiar and beloved. From all this it begins to be apparent what is meant by 'transcendence'.

In regard to the Holocaust, Nolte contended that because Adolf Hitler identified Jews with modernity, the basic thrust of Nazi policies towards Jews had always aimed at genocide. Nolte wrote that:

Auschwitz was contained in the principles of Nazi racist theory like the seed in the fruit.

Nolte believed that, for Hitler, Jews represented "the historical process itself". Nolte argues that Hitler was "logically consistent" in seeking genocide of the Jews because Hitler detested modernity and identified Jews with the things that he most hated in the world. According to Nolte, "In Hitler's extermination of the Jews, it was not a case of criminals committing criminal deeds, but of a uniquely monstrous action in which principles ran riot in a frenzy of self-destruction". Nolte's theories about Nazi antisemitism as a rejection of modernity inspired the Israeli historian Otto Dov Kulka to argue that National Socialism was an attack on "the very roots of Western civilisation, its basic values and moral foundations".

The Three Faces of Fascism has been much praised as a seminal contribution to the creation of a theory of generic fascism based on a history of ideas, as opposed to the previous class-based analyses (especially the "Rage of the Lower Middle Class" thesis) that had characterized both Marxist and liberal interpretations of fascism. The German historian Jen-Werner Müller wrote that Nolte "almost single-handedly" brought down the totalitarianism paradigm in the 1960s and replaced it with the fascism paradigm. British historian Roger Griffin has written that although written in arcane and obscure language, Nolte's theory of fascism as a "form of resistance to transcendence" marked an important step in the understanding of fascism, and helped to spur scholars into new avenues of research on fascism.

Criticism from the left, for example by Sir Ian Kershaw, centered on Nolte's focus on ideas as opposed to social and economic conditions as a motivating force for fascism, and that Nolte depended too much on fascist writings to support his thesis. Kershaw described Nolte's theory of fascism as "resistance to transcendence" as "mystical and mystifying". The American historian Fritz Stern wrote that The Three Faces of Fascism was an "uneven book" that was "weak" on Action Française, "strong" on Fascism and "masterly" on National Socialism.

Later in the 1970s, Nolte was to reject aspects of the theory of generic fascism that he had championed in The Three Faces of Fascism and instead moved closer to embracing totalitarian theory as a way of explaining both Nazi Germany and the Soviet Union. In Nolte's opinion, Nazi Germany was a "mirror image" of the Soviet Union and, with the exception of the "technical detail" of mass gassing, everything the Nazis did in Germany had already been done by the communists in Russia.

== Methodology ==
All of Nolte's historical work has been heavily influenced by German traditions of philosophy. In particular, Nolte seeks to find the essences of the "metapolitical phenomenon" of history, to discover the grand ideas which motivated all of history. As such, Nolte's work has been oriented towards the general as opposed to the specific attributes of a particular period of time. In his 1974 book Deutschland und der kalte Krieg (Germany and the Cold War), Nolte examined the partition of Germany after 1945, not by looking at the specific history of the Cold War and Germany, but rather by examining other divided states throughout history, treating the German partition as the supreme culmination of the "metapolitical" idea of partition caused by rival ideologies. In Nolte's view, the division of Germany made that nation the world's central battlefield between Soviet communism and American democracy, both of which were rival streams of the "transcendence" that had vanquished Nazi Germany, the ultimate enemy of "transcendence". Nolte called the Cold War

the ideological and political conflict for the future structure of a united world, carried on for an indefinite period since 1917 (indeed anticipated as early as 1776) by several militant universalisms, each of which possesses at least one major state.

Nolte ended Deutschland und der kalte Krieg with a call for Germans to escape their fate as the world's foremost battleground for the rival ideologies of American democracy and Soviet communism by returning to the values of the German Empire. Likewise, Nolte called for the end of what he regarded as the unfair stigma attached to German nationalism because of National Socialism, and demanded that historians recognize that every country in the world had at some point in its history had "its own Hitler era, with its monstrosities and sacrifices".

In 1978, the American historian Charles S. Maier described Nolte's approach in Deutschland und der kalte Krieg as:

This approach threatens to degenerate into the excessive valuation of abstraction as a surrogate for real transactions that Heine satirized and Marx dissected. How should we cope with a study that begins its discussion of the Cold War with Herodotus and the Greeks versus the Persians? ... Instead Nolte indulges in a potted history of Cold War events as they engulfed Asia and the Middle East as well as Europe, up through the Sino-Soviet dispute, the Vietnam War and SALT. The rationale is evidently that Germany can be interpreted only in the light of the world conflict, but the result verges on a centrifugal, coffee-table narrative.

Nolte has little regard for specific historical context in his treatment of the history of ideas, opting to seek what Carl Schmitt labeled the abstract "final" or "ultimate" ends of ideas, which for Nolte are the most extreme conclusions which can be drawn from an idea, representing the ultima terminus of the "metapolitical". For Nolte, ideas have a force of their own, and once a new idea has been introduced into the world, except for the total destruction of society, it cannot be ignored any more than the discovery of how to make fire or the invention of nuclear weapons can be ignored. In his 1974 book Deutschland und der kalte Krieg (Germany and the Cold War), Nolte wrote there was "a worldwide reproach that the United States was after all putting into practice in Vietnam, nothing less than its basically crueler version of Auschwitz".

The books Der Faschismus in seiner Epoche, Deutschland und der kalte Krieg, and Marxismus und industrielle Revolution (Marxism and the Industrial Revolution) formed a trilogy in which Nolte seeks to explain what he considered to be the most important developments of the 20th century.

== The Historikerstreit ==
=== Nolte's thesis ===
Nolte is best known for his role in launching the Historikerstreit ('historians' dispute') of 1986 and 1987. On 6 June 1986 Nolte published a feuilleton opinion piece entitled "Vergangenheit, die nicht vergehen will: Eine Rede, die geschrieben, aber nicht mehr gehalten werden konnte" ("The Past That Will Not Pass: A Speech That Could Be Written but No Longer Delivered") in the Frankfurter Allgemeine Zeitung. His feuilleton was a distillation of ideas he had first introduced in lectures delivered in 1976 and in 1980. Earlier in 1986, Nolte had planned to deliver a speech before the Frankfurt Römerberg Conversations (an annual gathering of intellectuals), but he had claimed that the organizers of the event withdrew their invitation. In response, an editor and co-publisher of the Frankfurter Allgemeine Zeitung, Joachim Fest, allowed Nolte to have his speech printed as a feuilleton in his newspaper. One of Nolte's leading critics, British historian Richard J. Evans, claims that the organizers of the Römerberg Conversations did not withdraw their invitation, and that Nolte had just refused to attend.

Nolte began his feuilleton by remarking that it was necessary in his opinion to draw a "line under the German past". Nolte argued that the memory of the Nazi era was "a bugaboo, as a past that in the process of establishing itself in the present or that is suspended above the present like an executioner's sword". Nolte complained that excessive present-day interest in the Nazi period had the effect of drawing "attention away from the pressing questions of the present—for example, the question of 'unborn life' or the presence of genocide yesterday in Vietnam and today in Afghanistan".

The crux of Nolte's thesis was presented when he wrote:

"It is a notable shortcoming of the literature about National Socialism that it does not know or does not want to admit to what degree all the deeds—with the sole exception of the technical process of gassing—that the National Socialists later committed had already been described in a voluminous literature of the early 1920s: mass deportations and shootings, torture, death camps, extermination of entire groups using strictly objective selection criteria, and public demands for the annihilation of millions of guiltless people who were thought to be "enemies".

It is probable that many of these reports were exaggerated. It is certain that the “White Terror” also committed terrible deeds, even though its program contained no analogy to the “extermination of the bourgeoisie”. Nonetheless, the following question must seem permissible, even unavoidable: Did the National Socialists or Hitler perhaps commit an “Asiatic” deed merely because they and their ilk considered themselves to be the potential victims of an “Asiatic” deed? Wasn’t the 'Gulag Archipelago' more original than Auschwitz? Was the Bolshevik murder of an entire class not the logical and factual prius of the "racial murder" of National Socialism? Cannot Hitler's most secret deeds be explained by the fact that he had not forgotten the rat cage? Did Auschwitz in its root causes not originate in a past that would not pass?

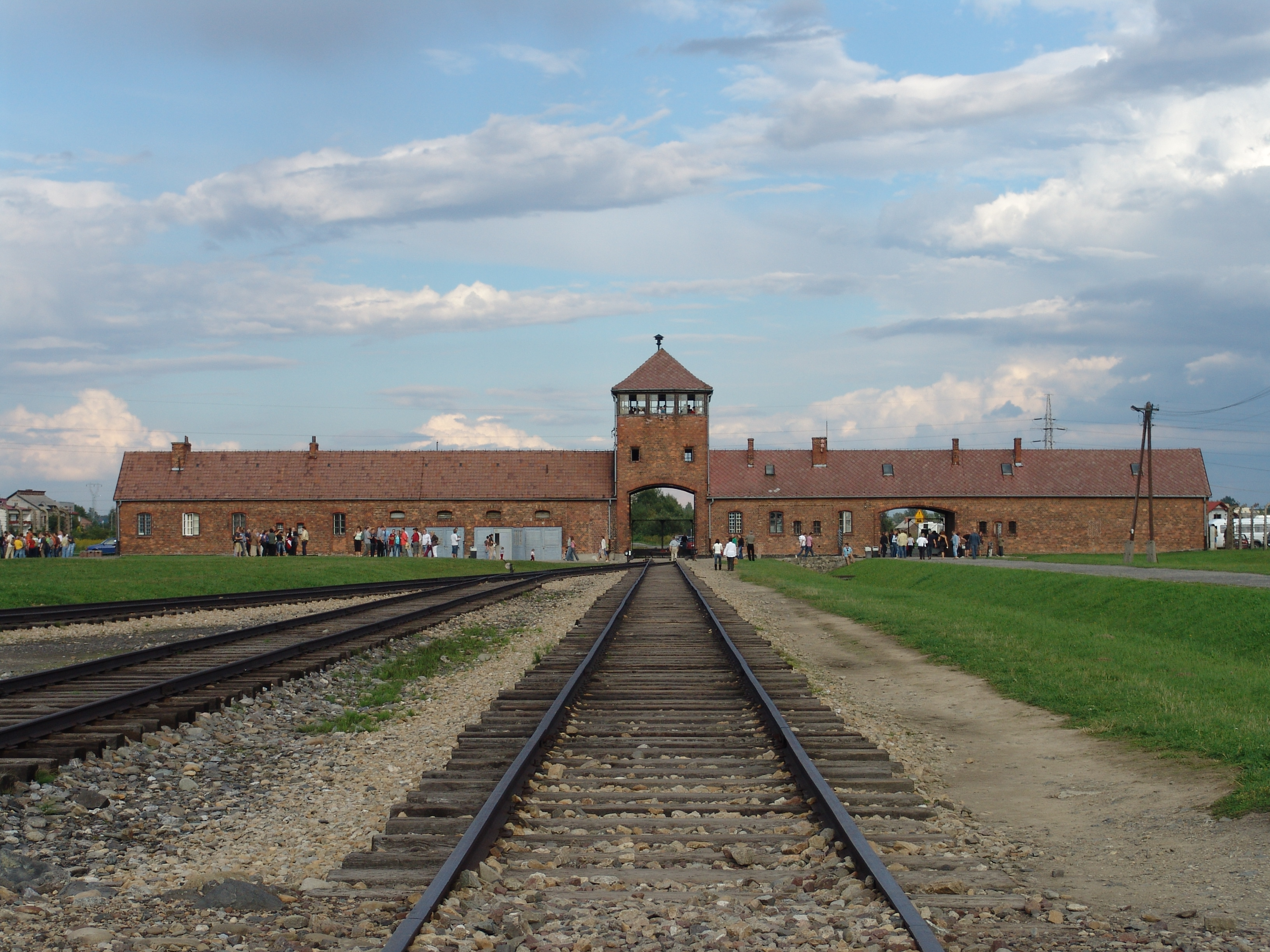
Nolte called the Auschwitz death camp and the other German death camps of World War II a "copy" of the Soviet Gulag camps.

In addition, Nolte sees his work as the beginning of a much-needed revisionist treatment to end the "negative myth" of Nazi Germany that dominates contemporary perceptions. Nolte took the view that the principal problem of German history was this "negative myth" of Nazi Germany, which cast the Nazi era as the ne plus ultra of evil.

Nolte contends that the great decisive event of the 20th century was the Russian Revolution of 1917, which plunged all of Europe into a long-simmering civil war that lasted until 1945. To Nolte, fascism, communism's twin, arose as a desperate response by the threatened middle classes of Europe to what Nolte has often called the "Bolshevik peril". He suggests that if one wishes to understand the Holocaust, one should begin with the Industrial Revolution in Britain, and then understand the rule of the Khmer Rouge in Cambodia.

In his 1987 book Der europäische Bürgerkrieg 1917–1945, Nolte argued in the interwar period, Germany was Europe's best hope for progress. Nolte wrote that "if Europe was to succeed in establishing itself as a world power on an equal footing [with the United States and the Soviet Union], then Germany had to be the core of the new 'United States'". Nolte claimed if Germany had to continue to abide by Part V of the Treaty of Versailles, which had disarmed Germany, then Germany would have been destroyed by aggression from her neighbors sometime later in the 1930s, and with Germany's destruction, there would have been no hope for a "United States of Europe". The British historian Richard J. Evans accused Nolte of engaging in a geopolitical fantasy.

=== The ensuing controversy ===
These views ignited a firestorm of controversy. Most historians in West Germany and virtually all historians outside Germany condemned Nolte's interpretation as factually incorrect, and as coming dangerously close to justifying the Holocaust. Many historians, such as Steven T. Katz, claimed that Nolte's “Age of Genocide” concept “trivialized” the Holocaust by reducing it to just one of many 20th century genocides. A common line of criticism was that Nazi crimes, above all the Holocaust, were singular and unique in their nature, and should not be loosely analogized to the crimes of others. Some historians such as Hans-Ulrich Wehler were most forceful in arguing that the sufferings of the "kulaks" deported during the Soviet "dekulakization" campaign of the early 1930s were in no way analogous to the suffering of the Jews deported in the early 1940s. Many were angered by Nolte's claim that "the so-called annihilation of the Jews under the Third Reich was a reaction or a distorted copy and not a first act or an original", with many wondering why Nolte spoke of the "so-called annihilation of the Jews" in describing the Holocaust. Some of the historians who denounced Nolte's views included Hans Mommsen, Jürgen Kocka, Detlev Peukert, Martin Broszat, Hans-Ulrich Wehler, Michael Wolffsohn, Heinrich August Winkler, Wolfgang Mommsen, Karl Dietrich Bracher and Eberhard Jäckel. Much (though not all) of the criticism of Nolte came from historians who favored either the Sonderweg (Special Way) and/or intentionalist/functionalist interpretations of German history.

Coming to Nolte's defence were the journalist Joachim Fest, the philosopher Helmut Fleischer, and the historians Klaus Hildebrand, Rainer Zitelmann, Hagen Schulze, Thomas Nipperdey and Imanuel Geiss. The last was unusual amongst Nolte's defenders as Geiss was normally identified with the left, while the rest of Nolte's supporters were seen as either on the right or holding centrist views. In response to Wehler's book, Geiss later published a book entitled Der Hysterikerstreit. Ein unpolemischer Essay (The Hysterical Dispute: An Unpolemical Essay) in which he largely defended Nolte against Wehler's criticisms. Geiss wrote Nolte's critics had "taken in isolation" his statements and were guilty of being "hasty readers".

In particular, controversy centered on an argument of Nolte's 1985 essay “Between Myth and Revisionism” from the book Aspects of the Third Reich, first published in German as "Die negative Lebendigkeit des Dritten Reiches" ("The Negative Vitality of the Third Reich") as an opinion piece in the Frankfurter Allgemeine Zeitung on 24 July 1980, but which did not attract widespread attention until 1986 when Jürgen Habermas criticized the essay in a feuilleton piece. Nolte had delivered a lecture at the Siemens-Stiftung in 1980, and excerpts from his speech were published in the Frankfurter Allgemeine Zeitung without attracting controversy. In his essay, Nolte argued that if the PLO were to destroy Israel, then the subsequent history written in the new Palestinian state would portray the former Israeli state in the blackest of colors with no references to any of the positive features of the defunct state. In Nolte's opinion, a similar situation of history written only by the victors exists in regards to the history of Nazi Germany. Many historians, such as British historian Richard J. Evans, have asserted that, based on this statement, Nolte appears to believe that the only reason why Nazism is regarded as evil is because Germany lost World War II, with no regard for the Holocaust. In a review which appeared in the Historische Zeitschrift journal on 2 April 1986 Klaus Hildebrand called Nolte's essay "Between Myth and Revisionism" "trailblazing". In the same review Hildebrand argued Nolte had in a praiseworthy way sought:

"to incorporate in historicizing fashion that central element for the history of National Socialism and of the "Third Reich" of the annihilatory capacity of the ideology and of the regime, and to comprehend this totalitarian reality in the interrelated context of Russian and German history".

=== Habermas' attack ===
The philosopher Jürgen Habermas in an article in the Die Zeit of 11 July 1986 strongly criticized Nolte, along with Andreas Hillgruber and Michael Stürmer, for engaging in what Habermas called “apologetic” history writing in regards to the Nazi era, and for seeking to “close Germany’s opening to the West” that in Habermas's view has existed since 1945.

In particular, Habermas took Nolte to task for suggesting a moral equivalence between the Holocaust and the Khmer Rouge genocide. In Habermas's opinion, since Cambodia was a backward, Third World agrarian state and Germany a modern, industrial state, there was no comparison between the two genocides.

=== War of words in the German press ===
In response to Habermas's essay, Klaus Hildebrand came to Nolte's defence. In an essay entitled "The Age of Tyrants", first published in the Frankfurter Allgemeine Zeitung on 31 July 1986, he went on to praise Nolte for daring to open up new questions for research.

Nolte, for his part, started to write a series of letters to newspapers such as Die Zeit and Frankfurter Allgemeine Zeitung attacking his critics; for example, in a letter to Die Zeit on 1 August 1986, Nolte complained that his critic Jürgen Habermas was attempting to censor him for expressing his views, and accused Habermas of being the person responsible for blocking him from attending the Römerberg Conversations. In the same letter, Nolte described himself as the unnamed historian whose views on the reasons for the Holocaust had caused Saul Friedländer to walk out in disgust from a dinner party hosted by Nolte in Berlin in February or March 1986 that Habermas had alluded to in an earlier letter.

Responding to the essay "The Age of Tyrants: History and Politics" by Klaus Hildebrand that defended Nolte, Habermas wrote:

"In his essay Ernst Nolte discusses the 'so-called' annihilation of the Jews (in H.W. Koch, ed. Aspects of the Third Reich, London, 1985). Chaim Weizmann's declaration in the beginning of September 1939 that the Jews of the world would fight on the side of Britain, 'justified' – so opined Nolte – Hitler to treat the Jews as prisoners of war and intern them. Other objections aside, I cannot distinguish between the insinuation that world Jewry is a subject of international law and the usual anti-Semitic projections. And if it had at least stopped with deportation. All this does not stop Klaus Hildebrand in the Historische Zeitschrift from commending Nolte's 'pioneering essay', because it 'attempts to project exactly the seemingly unique aspects of the history of the Third Reich onto the backdrop of the European and global development'. Hildebrand is pleased that Nolte denies the singularity of the Nazi atrocities."

In an essay entitled "Encumbered Remembrance", first published in the Frankfurter Allgemeine Zeitung on 29 August 1986, Fest claimed that Nolte's argument that Nazi crimes were not singular was correct. Fest accused Habermas of "academic dyslexia" and "character assassination" in his attacks on Nolte.

In a letter to the editor of Frankfurter Allgemeine Zeitung published on 6 September 1986 Karl Dietrich Bracher accused both Habermas and Nolte of both "...tabooing the concept of totalitarianism and inflating the formula of fascism".

The historian Eberhard Jäckel, in an essay first published in the Die Zeit newspaper on 12 September 1986, argued that Nolte's theory was ahistorical on the grounds that Hitler held the Soviet Union in contempt and could not have felt threatened as Nolte claimed. Jäckel later described Nolte's methods as a "game of confusion", comprising dressing hypotheses up as questions and then attacking critics demanding evidence for his assertions as seeking to block one from asking questions.

The philosopher Helmut Fleischer, in an essay first published in the Nürnberger Zeitung newspaper on 20 September 1986, defended Nolte against Habermas on the grounds that Nolte was only seeking to place the Holocaust into a wider political context of the time. Fleischer accused Habermas of seeking to impose on Germans a left-wing moral understanding of the Nazi period and of creating a "moral" Sondergericht (Special Court). Fleischer argued that Nolte was only seeking the "historicization" of National Socialism that Martin Broszat had called for in a 1985 essay by trying to understand what caused National Socialism, with a special focus on the fear of communism.

In an essay first published in Die Zeit on 26 September 1986, the historian Jürgen Kocka argued against Nolte that the Holocaust was indeed a "singular" event because it had been committed by an advanced Western nation, and argued that Nolte's comparisons of the Holocaust with similar mass killings in Pol Pot's Cambodia, Joseph Stalin's Soviet Union, and Idi Amin's Uganda were invalid because of the backward nature of those societies.

Hagen Schulze, in an essay first published in Die Zeit on 26 September 1986, defended Nolte, together with Andreas Hillgruber, and argued that Habermas was acting from "incorrect presuppositions" in attacking Nolte and Hillgruber for denying the "singularity" of the Holocaust. Schulze argued that Habermas's attack on Nolte was flawed because he failed to provide any proof that the Holocaust was unique, and argued there were many "aspects" of the Holocaust that were "common" to other historical events.

In an essay first published in the Frankfurter Rundschau newspaper on 14 November 1986, Heinrich August Winkler wrote of Nolte's essay "The Past That Will Not Pass":

"Those who read the Frankfurter Allgemeine all the way through to the culture section were able to read something under the title "The Past That Will Not Pass" that no German historian to date had noticed: that Auschwitz was only a copy of a Russian original – the Stalinist Gulag Archipelago. From a fear of the Bolsheviks’ Asiatic will to annihilate, Hitler himself committed an "Asiatic deed". Was the annihilation of the Jews a kind of putative self-defence? That is what Nolte’s speculation amounts to."

The political scientist Kurt Sontheimer, in an essay first published in the Rheinischer Merkur newspaper on 21 November 1986, accused Nolte and his supporters of attempting to create a new “national consciousness” intended to sever the Federal Republic's “intellectual and spiritual ties with the West”.

The German political scientist Richard Löwenthal noted that news of the Soviet kulak expulsions and the Holodomor did not reach Germany until 1941, so that Soviet atrocities could not possibly have influenced the Germans as Nolte claimed. In a letter to the editor of the Frankfurter Allgemeine Zeitung on 29 November 1986, Löwenthal argued the case for a "fundamental difference" in mass murder between Germany and the Soviet Union, and against the "equalizing" of various crimes in the 20th century.

The German historian Horst Möller, in an essay first published in late 1986 in the Beiträge zur Konfliktforschung magazine, argued that Nolte was not attempting to "excuse" Nazi crimes by comparing them with the crimes of others, but was instead trying to explain Nazi war-crimes. Möller argued that Nolte was only attempting to explain "irrational" events rationally, and that the Nazis really did believe that they were confronted with a world Jewish-Bolshevik conspiracy out to destroy Germany.

In an essay entitled "The Nazi Reign – A Case of Normal Tyranny?", first published in Die neue Gesellschaft magazine in late 1986, the political scientist Walter Euchner wrote that Nolte was wrong when he wrote of Hitler's alleged terror of the Austrian Social Democratic Party parades before 1914, arguing that Social Democratic parties in both Germany and Austria were fundamentally humane and pacifistic, instead of the terrorist-revolutionary entities Nolte alleged them to be.

=== Der europäische Bürgerkrieg ===
Another area of controversy was Nolte's 1987 book Der europäische Bürgerkrieg 1917–1945 (The European Civil War 1917–1945) and some accompanying statements, by which Nolte appeared to flirt with Holocaust denial as a serious historical argument. In a letter to Otto Dov Kulka of 8 December 1986 Nolte criticized the work of French Holocaust denier Robert Faurisson on the ground that the Holocaust did in fact occur, but he went on to argue that Faurisson's work had admirable motives in the form of sympathy for Palestinians and opposition to Israel. In Der europäische Bürgerkrieg, Nolte claimed that the intentions of Holocaust deniers are "often honorable", and that some of their claims are "not evidently without foundation". Kershaw has argued that Nolte was operating on the borderlines of Holocaust denial with his implied claim that the "negative myth" of Nazi Germany was created by Jewish historians, his allegations of the domination of Holocaust scholarship by Jewish historians, and his statements that one should withhold judgment on Holocaust deniers, who Nolte insists are not exclusively Germans or fascists. In Kershaw's opinion, Nolte is attempting to imply that Holocaust deniers are perhaps on to something.

In Der europäische Bürgerkrieg, Nolte put forward five different arguments as a way of criticizing the uniqueness of the Shoah thesis. These were as follows:

- There were other equally horrible acts of violence in the 20th century. Some of the examples Nolte cited were the Armenian genocide; Soviet deportations of the so-called "traitor nations", such as the Crimean Tatars and the Volga Germans; British "area bombing" in World War II; and American violence in the Vietnam War.
- Nazi genocide was only a copy of Soviet genocide, and thus can in no way be considered unique.
- Nolte argued that the vast majority of Germans had no knowledge of the Holocaust while it was happening Nolte claimed that the genocide of the Jews was Hitler's personal pet project, and that the Holocaust was the work of only a few Germans who were entirely unrepresentative of German society Contradicting the American historian Raul Hilberg, who claimed that hundreds of thousands of Germans were complicit in the Holocaust, from high-ranking bureaucrats to railway clerks and locomotive conductors, Nolte argued that the functional division of labour in modern society meant that most people in Germany had no idea of how they were assisting in genocide. In support of this, Nolte cited the voluminous memoirs of German generals and Nazi leaders, such as Albert Speer, who claimed to have no idea that their country was engaging in genocide during World War II.
- Nolte maintained that to a certain degree Nazi anti-Semitic policies were justifiable responses to Jewish actions against Germany, such as Weizmann's alleged 1939 "declaration of war" on Germany.
- Finally, Nolte hinted at the possibility that the Holocaust had never happened at all. Nolte claimed that the Wannsee Conference never took place, and argued that most Holocaust scholarship is flawed because most Holocaust historians are Jewish, and thus "biased" against Germany and in favour of the idea that there was a Holocaust.

The British historian Richard J. Evans criticized Nolte, accusing him of taking too seriously the work of Holocaust deniers, whom Evans called cranks, not historians. Likewise, Evans charged that Nolte was guilty of making assertions unsupported by the evidence, such as claiming that SS massacres of Russian Jews were a form of counterinsurgency, or taking at face value the self-justifying claims of German generals who professed to be ignorant of the Shoah.

Perhaps the most extreme response to Nolte's thesis occurred on 9 February 1988, when his car was burned by leftist extremists in Berlin. Nolte called the case of arson "terrorism", and maintained that the attack was inspired by his opponents in the Historikerstreit.

=== International reaction ===
Criticism from abroad came from Ian Kershaw, Gordon A. Craig, Richard J. Evans, Saul Friedländer, John Lukacs, Michael Marrus, and Timothy Mason. Mason wrote against Nolte, calling for the sort of theories of generic fascism that Nolte himself had once championed:

If we can do without much of the original contents of the concept of ‘fascism’, we cannot do without comparison. ‘Historicization’ may easily become a recipe for provincialism. And the moral absolutes of Habermas, however politically and didactically impeccable, also carry a shadow of provincialism, as long as they fail to recognize that fascism was a continental phenomenon, and that Nazism was a peculiar part of something much larger. Pol Pot, the rat torture, and the fate of the Armenians are all extraneous to any serious discussion of Nazism; Mussolini’s Italy is not.

Anson Rabinbach accused Nolte of attempting to erase German guilt for the Holocaust. Ian Kershaw wrote that Nolte was claiming that the Jews had essentially brought the Holocaust down on themselves, and were the authors of their own misfortunes in the Shoah. Elie Wiesel called Nolte, together with Klaus Hildebrand, Andreas Hillgruber, and Michael Stürmer, one of the “four bandits” of German historiography.

The American historian Charles Maier rejected Nolte's claims regarding the moral equivalence of the Holocaust and Soviet terror on the grounds that while the latter was extremely brutal, it did not seek the physical annihilation of an entire people as state policy. The American historian Donald McKale blasted both Nolte and Andreas Hillgruber for their statements that the Allied strategic bombing offensives were just as much acts of genocide as the Holocaust, writing that that was just the sort of nonsense one would expect from Nazi apologists like Nolte and Hillgruber.

In a 1987 essay, the Austrian-born Israeli historian Walter Grab accused Nolte of engaging in an “apologia” for Nazi Germany. Grab called Nolte's claim that Weizmann's letter to Chamberlain was a "Jewish declaration of war" that justified the Germans "interning" European Jews a "monstrous thesis" that was not supported by the facts. Grab accused Nolte of ignoring the economic impoverishment and total lack of civil rights that the Jewish community in Germany lived under in 1939. Grab wrote that Nolte "mocks" the Jewish victims of National Socialism with his "absolutely infamous" statement that it was Weizmann with his letter that caused all of the Jewish death and suffering during the Holocaust.

=== Conclusion of dispute ===
In his 1989 book, In Hitler's Shadow: West German Historians and the Attempt to Escape From the Nazi Past, British historian Richard J. Evans wrote:

Finally, Nolte's attempts to establish the comparability of Auschwitz rest in part upon an extension of the concept of "genocide" to actions which cannot plausibly justify being described in this way. However much one might wish to criticize the Allied strategic-bombing offensive against German cities, it cannot be termed genocidal because there was no intention to exterminate the entire German people. Dresden was bombed after Coventry, not the other way around, and it is implausible to suggest that the latter was a response to the former; on the contrary, there was indeed an element of retaliation and revenge in the strategic bombing offensive, which is precisely one of the grounds on which it has often been criticized. There is no evidence to support Nolte's speculation that the ethnic Germans in Poland would have been entirely exterminated had the Nazis not completed their invasion quickly. Neither the Poles nor the Russians had any intention of exterminating the German people as a whole.

Citing Mein Kampf, Evans said that Hitler was an anti-Semite long before 1914 and it was the SPD (the moderate left), not the Bolsheviks, whom Hitler regarded as his main enemies.

Nolte's opponents have expressed intense disagreement with his evidence for a Jewish "war" on Germany. They argue that Weizmann's letter to Chamberlain was written in his capacity as head of the World Zionist Organization, not on behalf of the entire Jewish people of the world, and that Nolte's views are based on the spurious idea that all Jews comprised a distinct "nationality" who took their marching orders from Jewish organizations.

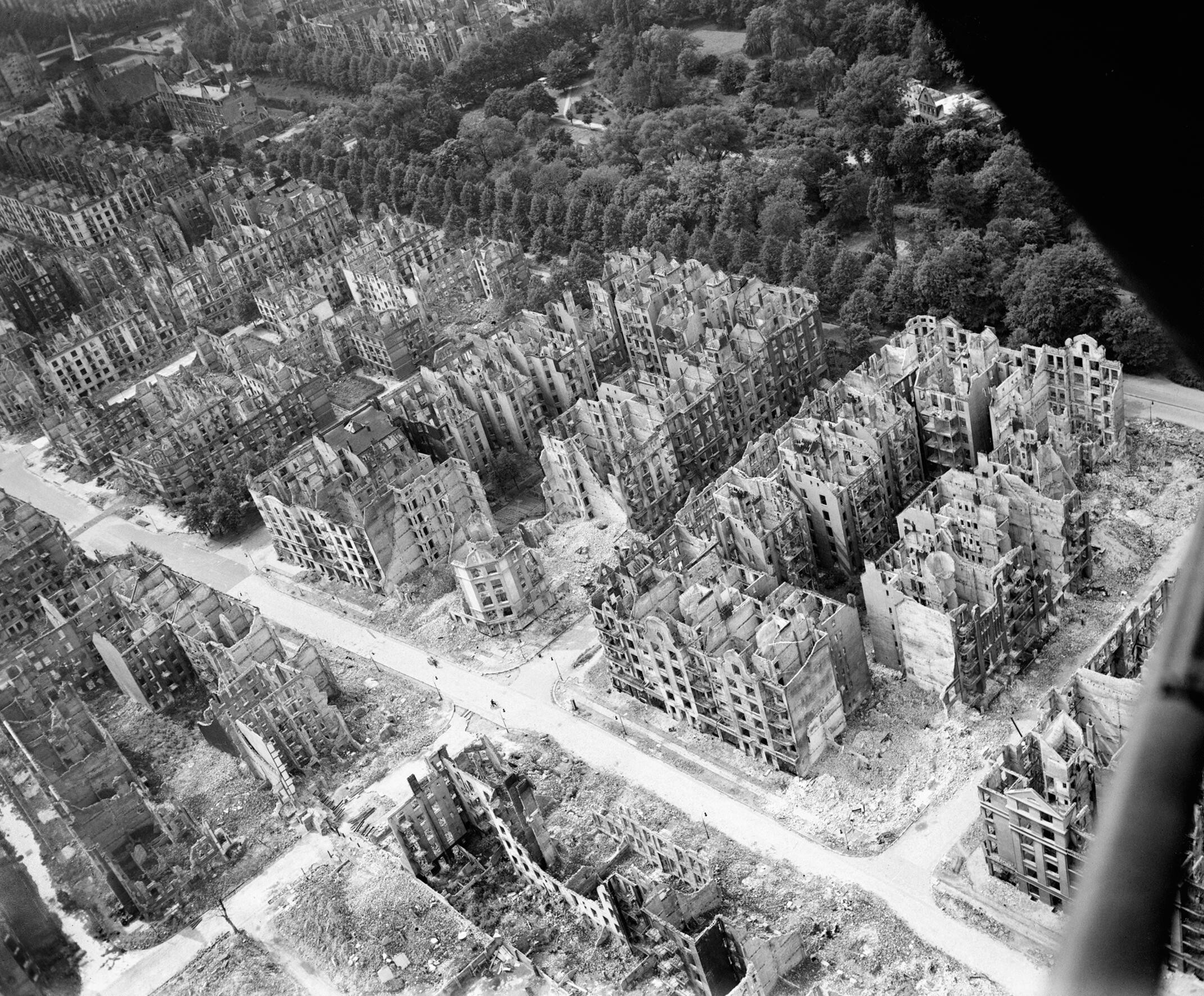
The ruins of Hamburg after the 1943 firebombing. Nolte called British "area bombing" of Germany a policy of "genocide".

Because of the views that he expressed during the Historikerstreit, Nolte has often been accused of being a Nazi apologist and an anti-Semite. Nolte himself has always vehemently denied these charges. Nolte is by his own admission an intense German nationalist and his stated goal is to restore the Germans' sense of pride in their history that he feels has been missing since 1945. In a September 1987 interview, Nolte stated that the Germans were "once the master race (Herrenvolk), now they are the "guilty race" (Sündervolk). The one is merely an inversion of the other". Nolte's defenders have pointed to numerous statements on his part condemning Nazi Germany and the Holocaust. Nolte's critics have acknowledged these statements, but claim that Nolte's arguments can be constructed as being sympathetic to the Nazis, such as his defence of the Commissar Order as a legitimate military order, his argument that the Einsatzgruppen massacres of Soviet Jews were a reasonable "preventative security" response to partisan attacks, his statements citing Viktor Suvorov that Operation Barbarossa was a "preventive war" forced on Hitler allegedly by an impending Soviet attack, his claim that too much scholarship on the Holocaust has been the work of "biased" Jewish historians, or his use of Nazi-era language such as his practice of referring to Red Army soldiers in World War II as “Asiatic hordes”.

== Later work ==
In his 1991 book Geschichtsdenken im 20. Jahrhundert (Historical Thinking in the 20th Century), Nolte asserted that the 20th century had produced three “extraordinary states”, namely Germany, the Soviet Union, and Israel. He claimed that all three were “abnormal once”, but whereas the Soviet Union and Germany were now “normal” states, Israel was still “abnormal” and, in Nolte's view, in danger of becoming a fascist state that might commit genocide against the Palestinians.

Between 1995 and 1997, Nolte debated with the French historian François Furet in an exchange of letters on the relationship between fascism and communism. The debate had started with a footnote in Furet's book, Le Passé d'une illusion (The Passing of an Illusion), in which Furet acknowledged Nolte's merit of comparatively studying communism and Nazism, an almost-forbidden practice in Continental Europe. Both ideologies typify in a radical way the contradictions of liberalism. They follow a chronological sequence: Lenin predates Mussolini, who, in turn, precedes Hitler. Furet noted that Nolte's theses went against the established notions of culpability and apprehension to criticize the idea of anti-fascism common in the West. This prompted an epistolary exchange between the two of them in which Furet argued that both ideologies were totalitarian twins that shared the same origins, but Nolte maintained his views of a kausaler Nexus (causal nexus) between fascism and communism to which the former had been a response. After Furet's death, their correspondence was published as a book in France in 1998, Fascisme et Communisme: échange épistolaire avec l'historien allemand Ernst Nolte prolongeant la Historikerstreit (Fascism and Communism: Epistolary Exchanges with the German Historian Ernst Nolte Extending the Historikerstreit). It was translated into English as Fascism and Communism in 2001. While pronouncing Stalin guilty of great crimes, Furet contended that although the histories of fascism and communism were essential to European history, there were singular events associated with each movement which differentiated them. He did not feel there was a precise parallel, as Nolte suggested, between the Holocaust and dekulakization.

Nolte often contributed Feuilleton (opinion pieces) to German newspapers such as Die Welt and the Frankfurter Allgemeine Zeitung. He was often described as one of the "most brooding, German thinkers about history". The historical consciousness and self-understanding of the Germans form a major theme of his essays. Nolte called the Federal Republic "a state born of contemporary history, a product of catastrophe erected to overcome catastrophe" In a Feuilleton piece published in Die Welt entitled "Auschwitz als Argument in der Geschichtstheorie" (Auschwitz as An Argument in Historical Theory) on 2 January 1999, Nolte criticized his old opponent Richard J. Evans for his book In The Defence of History, on the grounds that aspects of the Holocaust are open to revision and so Evans’s attacks on Nolte during the Historikerstreit had been unwarranted. Specifically, citing the American political scientist Daniel Jonah Goldhagen, Nolte argued that the effectiveness of the gas chambers as killing instruments was exaggerated, more Jews were killed by mass shooting than by mass gassing, the number of people killed at Auschwitz was overestimated after 1945 (the Soviets initially exaggerated the death toll at 4 million although the consensus today is 1.1 million), Binjamin Wilkomirski's memoir of Auschwitz was a forgery and so the history of the Holocaust is open to reinterpretation. In October 1999, Evans stated in response that he agreed with Nolte on those points but argued that form of argument to be an attempt by Nolte to avoid responding to his criticism of him during the Historikerstreit.

On 4 June 2000, Nolte was awarded the Konrad Adenauer Prize. The award attracted considerable public debate and was presented to Nolte by Horst Möller, the Director of the Institut für Zeitgeschichte (Institute for Contemporary History), who praised Nolte’s scholarship but tried to steer clear of Nolte’s more controversial claims. In his acceptance speech, Nolte commented, "We should leave behind the view that the opposite of National Socialist goals is always good and right," while suggesting that excessive "Jewish" support for Communism furnished the Nazis with "rational reasons" for their anti-Semitism.

In August 2000, Nolte wrote a favorable review in the Die Woche newspaper of Norman Finkelstein’s book The Holocaust Industry, claiming Finkelstein’s book buttressed his claim that the memory of the Holocaust had been used by Jewish groups for their own reasons. Nolte’s positive review of The Holocaust Industry may have been related to Finkelstein’s endorsement in his book of Nolte’s demand, first made during the Historikerstreit, for the “normalization” of the German past

In a 2004 book review of Richard Overy's monograph The Dictators, the American historian Anne Applebaum argued that it was a valid intellectual exercise to compare the German and the Soviet dictatorships, but she complained that Nolte's arguments had needlessly discredited the comparative approach. In response, Paul Gottfried in 2005 defended Nolte from Applebaum's charge of attempting to justify the Holocaust by contending that Nolte had merely argued that the Nazis had made a link in their own minds between Jews and communists and that the Holocaust was their attempt to eliminate the most likely supporters of communism. In a June 2006 interview with the newspaper Die Welt, Nolte echoed theories that he had first expressed in The Three Faces of Fascism by identifying Islamic fundamentalism as a "third variant", after communism and National Socialism, of "the resistance to transcendence". He expressed regret that he would not have enough time for a full study of Islamic fascism In the same interview, Nolte said that he could not forgive Augstein for calling Hillgruber a "constitutional Nazi" during the Historikerstreit and claimed that Wehler had helped to hound Hillgruber to his death in 1989. Nolte ended the interview by calling himself a philosopher, not a historian, and argued that the hostile reactions that he often encountered from historians were caused by his status as a philosopher writing history.

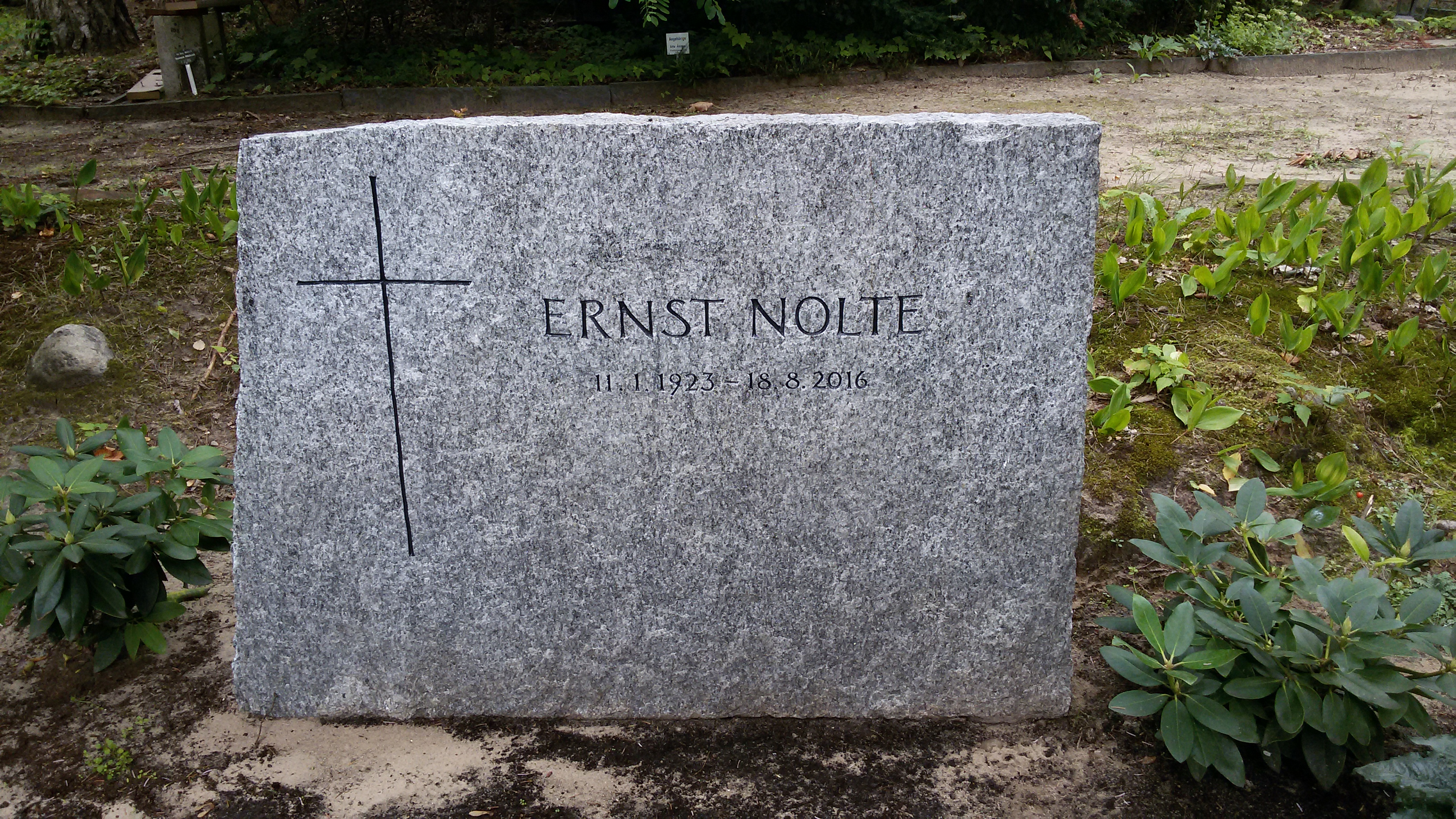
Ernst Nolte's grave in Friedhof der St.-Matthias-Gemeinde (Berlin-Tempelhof)

In his 2005 book The Russian Roots of Nazism: White Émigrés and The Making of National Socialism, the American historian Michael Kellogg argued that there were two extremes of thinking about the origins of National Socialism, with Nolte arguing for a "causal nexus" between communism in Russia and Nazism in Germany, but the other extreme was represented by the American historian Daniel Goldhagen, whose theories debate a unique German culture of "eliminationist" anti-Semitism. Kellogg argued that his book represented an attempt at adopting a middle position between Nolte's and Goldhagen's positions but that he leaned closer to Nolte's by contending that anti-Bolshevik and anti-Semitic Russian émigrés played an underappreciated key role in the 1920s in the development of Nazi ideology, their influence on Nazi thinking about Judeo-Bolshevism being especially notable.

In his 2006 book Europe at War 1939–1945: No Simple Victory, the British historian Norman Davies lends Nolte's theories support:

Ten years later, in The European Civil War (1987), the German historian Ernst Nolte (b. 1923) brought ideology into the equation. The First World War had spawned the Bolshevik Revolution, he maintained, and fascism should be seen as a "counter-revolution" against communism. More pointedly, since fascism followed communism chronologically, he argued that some of the Nazis' political techniques and practices had been copied from those of the Soviet Union. Needless to say, such propositions were thought anathema by leftists who believe that fascism was an original and unparalleled evil.

Davies concluded that revelations made after the fall of communism in Eastern Europe about Soviet crimes had discredited Nolte's critics.

== Awards ==
- Hanns Martin Schleyer Prize (1985)
- Konrad Adenauer Prize (2000)
- Gerhard Löwenthal Honor Award (2011)

== Works ==
- "Marx und Nietzsche im Sozialismus des jungen Mussolini" pp. 249–335 from Historische Zeitschrift, Volume 191, Issue #2, October 1960.
- "Die Action Française 1899–1944" pp. 124–165 from Vierteljahrshefte für Zeitgeschichte, Volume 9, Issue 2, April 1961.
- "Eine frühe Quelle zu Hitlers Antisemitismus" pp. 584–606 from Historische Zeitschrift, Volume 192, Issue #3, June 1961.
- “Zur Phänomenologie des Faschismus” pp. 373–407 from Vierteljahrshefte für Zeitgeschichte, Volume 10, Issue #4, October 1962.
- Der Faschismus in seiner Epoche: die Action française der italienische Faschismus, der Nationalsozialismus, München : R. Piper, 1963, translated into English as The Three Faces of Fascism; Action Francaise, Italian Fascism, National Socialism, London, Weidenfeld and Nicolson 1965.
- Review of Action Français Royalism and Reaction in Twentieth-Century France by Eugen Weber pp. 694–701 from Historische Zeitschrift, Volume 199, Issue # 3, December 1964.
- Review of Le origini del socialismo italiano by Richard Hostetter pp. 701–704 from Historische Zeitschrift, Volume 199, Issue #3, December 1964.
- Review of Albori socialisti nel Risorgimento by Carlo Francovich pp. 181–182 from Historische Zeitschrift, Volume 200, Issue # 1, February 1965.
- “Grundprobleme der Italienischen Geschichte nach der Einigung” pp. 332–346 from Historische Zeitschrift, Volume 200, Issue #2, April 1965.
- “Zur Konzeption der Nationalgeschichte heute” pp. 603–621 from Historische Zeitschrift, Volume 202, Issue #3, June 1966.
- "Zeitgenössische Theorien über den Faschismus" pp. 247–268 from Vierteljahrshefte für Zeitgeschichte, Volume 15, Issue #3, July 1967.
- Der Faschismus: von Mussolini zu Hitler. Texte, Bilder und Dokumente, Munich: Desch, 1968.
- Die Krise des liberalen Systems und die faschistischen Bewegungen, Munich: R. Piper, 1968.
- Sinn und Widersinn der Demokratisierung in der Universität, Rombach Verlag: Freiburg, 1968.
- Les Mouvements fascistes, l'Europe de 1919 a 1945, Paris : Calmann-Levy, 1969.
- "Big Business and German Politics: A Comment" pp. 71–78 from The American Historical Review, Volume 75, Issue#1, October 1969.
- “Zeitgeschichtsforschung und Zeitgeschichte” pp. 1–11 from Vierteljahrshefte für Zeitgeschichte, Volume 18. Issue #1, January 1970.
- Nolte, Ernst (1974). Deutschland und der kalte Krieg. – München, Zürich: Piper (1974). 755 S. 8°. Piper. ISBN 978-3-492-02092-3.
- “The Relationship Between "Bourgeois" And "Marxist" Historiography” pp. 57–73 from History & Theory, Volume 14, Issue 1, 1975.
- “Review: Zeitgeschichte als Theorie. Eine Erwiderung” pp. 375–386 from Historische Zeitschrift, Volume 222, Issue #2, April 1976.
- Nolte, Ernst (1972). Theorien über den Faschismus. ISBN 978-3-462-00607-0.
- Henry Ashby Turner (1975). Reappraisals of fascism. New Viewpoints. ISBN 978-0-531-05372-0.
- Nolte, Ernst (1984). Die faschistischen Bewegungen: die Krise des liberalen Systems und die Entwicklung der Faschismen. ISBN 978-3-423-04004-4.
- Nolte, Ernst (1982). Marxism, fascism, Cold War. Van Gorcum. ISBN 978-90-232-1877-7.
- Was ist bürgerlich? und andere Artikel, Abhandlungen, Auseinandersetzungen, Stuttgart: Klett-Cotta, 1979.
- "What Fascism Is Not: Thoughts on the Deflation of a Concept: Comment" pp. 389–394 from The American Historical Review, Volume 84, Issue #2, April 1979.
- “Deutscher Scheinkonstitutionalismus?” pp. 529–550 from Historische Zeitschrift, Volume 288, Issue #3, June 1979.
- Nolte, Ernst (1983). Marxismus und industrielle Revolution. Klett-Cotta. ISBN 978-3-608-91128-2.
- "Marxismus und Nationalsozialismus" pp. 389–417 from Vierteljahrshefte für Zeitgeschichte, Volume 31, Issue # 3 July 1983.
- Review of Revolution und Weltbürgerkrieg. Studien zur Ouvertüre nach 1789 by Roman Schnur pp. 720–721 from Historische Zeitschrift, Volume 238, Issue # 3 June 1984.
- Hannsjoachim Wolfgang Koch (1985). Aspects of the Third Reich. Macmillan. ISBN 978-0-333-35272-4.
- Review of Der italienische Faschismus. Probleme und Forschungstendenzen pp. 469–471 from Historische Zeitschrift, Volume 240, Issue #2 April 1985.
- “Zusammenbruch und Neubeginn: Die Bedeutung des 8. Mai 1945” pp. 296–303 from Zeitschrift für Politik, Volume 32, Issue #3, 1985.
- “Philosophische Geschichtsschreibung heute?” pp. 265–289 from Historische Zeitschrift, Volume 242, Issue #2, April 1986.
- Nolte, Ernst (1987). Der europäische Bürgerkrieg 1917–1945. Nationalsozialismus und Bolschewismus. Propyläen Verlag. ISBN 3549072163.
- “Une Querelle D'Allemandes? Du Passe Qui Ne Veut Pas S'Effacer” pp. 36–39 from Documents, Volume 1, 1987.
- Nolte, Ernst (1987). Das Vergehen der Vergangenheit. Ullstein. ISBN 978-3-550-07217-8.
- Review: Ein Höhepunkt der Heidegger-Kritik? Victor Farias' Buch "Heidegger et le Nazisme" pp. 95–114 from Historische Zeitschrift, Volume 247, Issue #1, August 1988.
- "Das Vor-Urteil als "Strenge Wissenschaft." Zu den Rezensionen von Hans Mommsen und Wolfgang Schieder” pp. 537–551 from Geschichte und Gesellschaft, Volume 15, Issue #4, 1989.
- Nolte, Ernst (2000). Nietzsche und der Nietzscheanismus. Herbig. ISBN 978-3-7766-2153-2.
- Nolte, Ernst (1991). Lehrstück oder Tragödie?. Böhlau. ISBN 978-3-412-04291-2.
- Nolte, Ernst (1991). Geschichtsdenken im 20. Jahrhundert. Propyläen. ISBN 978-3-549-05379-9.
- Nolte, Ernst (1992). Martin Heidegger. Politik und Geschichte im Leben und Denken. Propyläen. ISBN 978-3-549-07241-7.
- Knowlton, James; Truett Cates (1993). Forever in the shadow of Hitler?: original documents of the Historikerstreit, the controversy concerning the singularity of the Holocaust. Humanities Press Intl. ISBN 978-0-391-03784-7.
- Nolte, Ernst (1993). Streitpunkte. Propyläen. ISBN 978-3-549-05234-1.
- Review of The Politics of Being The Political Thought of Martin Heidegger by Richard Wolin pp. 123–124 from Historische Zeitschrift, Volume 258, Issue # 1 February 1994.
- Die Deutschen und ihre Vergangenheit. Herbig Verlag. ISBN 978-3-7766-9004-0.
- "Die historisch-genetische Version der Totalitarismusthorie: Ärgernis oder Einsicht?" pp. 111–122 from Zeitschrift für Politik, Volume 43, Issue #2, 1996.
- Historische Existenz: Zwischen Anfang und Ende der Geschichte?, Munich: Piper 1998, ISBN 978-3-492-04070-9.
- Furet, François; Ernst Nolte (1 September 2001). Fascism and communism. University of Nebraska Press. ISBN 978-0-8032-1995-3.
- Nolte, Ernst (2002). Der kausale Nexus. Herbig. ISBN 978-3-7766-2279-9.
- Les Fondements historiques du national-socialisme, Paris: Editions du Rocher, 2002.
- L'eredità del nazionalsocialismo, Rome: Di Renzo Editore, 2003.
- co-written with Siegfried Gerlich Einblick in ein Gesamtwerk, Edition Antaios: Dresden 2005, ISBN 978-3-935063-61-6.
- Nolte, Ernst (2006). Die Weimarer Republik. Herbig. ISBN 978-3-7766-2491-5.
- Die dritte radikale Widerstandsbewegung: Der Islamismus, Landt Verlag, Berlin 2009, ISBN 978-3-938844-16-8.

Academic offices
Preceded by	Professor of Modern History at the University of Marburg; 1965–1973	Succeeded by
Preceded by	Professor of Modern History at the Free University of Berlin; 1973– (Professor Emeritus since 1991)	Succeeded by
Awards and achievements
Preceded by Friedrich August von Hayek	Hanns Martin Schleyer Prize; 1985	Succeeded by Karl Carstens
Preceded by Wolfgang Schäuble, freedom	Konrad Adenauer Prize, science (with Otfried Preußler, literature); 2000	Succeeded by Peter Maffay, culture
