= Deutschland und der kalte Krieg =

1974 book by Ernst Nolte

- Author: Ernst Nolte
- Language: German
- Subject: Cold War
- Publisher: Piper Verlag
- Publication date: 1974
- Publication place: West Germany
- Pages: 755
- ISBN: 978-3-492-02092-3

Deutschland und der kalte Krieg (lit. 'Germany and the Cold War') is a 1974 book by the German historian Ernst Nolte. It is an analysis of the Cold War from 1947 to 1953 through the conduct in foreign policy of the United States, the Soviet Union and Germany. Nolte characterises the conflict as only superficially clad in ideological differences and does not treat its political actions as driven by moral concerns. A revised second edition was published in 1985.

The unconcern for ideologies and values led to a cold and unsympathetic reception of the book. Felix Gilbert questioned Nolte's treatment of Germany as at the centre of the Cold War, writing that this expresses a return to "the traditional, nationalistic pattern of pre-World-War German history writing", and wrote that Nolte shows an unsatisfactory understanding of the political life and global engagement of the United States. Wolfram F. Hanrieder wrote that the book's strengths and weaknesses result from Nolte's "phenomenology of ideas", describing it as "large in size, large in conception, large in shortcomings".

== See also ==
- Cold War (1948–1953)
