= Der europäische Bürgerkrieg 1917–1945 =

1987 book by Ernst Nolte

- Author: Ernst Nolte
- Language: German
- Publisher: Propyläen Verlag
- Publication date: 1987
- Publication place: West Germany
- Pages: 616
- ISBN: 3549072163

Der europäische Bürgerkrieg 1917–1945. Nationalsozialismus und Bolschewismus (lit. 'The European Civil War 1917–1945: National Socialism and Bolshevism') is a 1987 book by the German historian Ernst Nolte. It presents the Bolshevik revolution as the beginning of a continental civil war that defined Europe's major ideological and military conflicts until the end of World War II.

Published by Propyläen Verlag in 1987, the book and its reception became part of the Historikerstreit, which was a public dispute about Nazi Germany and the Holocaust in German historiography. It prompted increased marginalisation of Nolte due to his argument that Nazi mass murder of Jews was an "excessive reaction" to the Bolshevik revolution.

Nolte's conception of a pan-European civil war had a continuing impact on other scholars, notably Enzo Traverso in his 2007 book Fire and Blood: The European Civil War, 1914–1945. Traverso modified the thesis by regarding the crisis of liberalism before World War I as the start of the civil war, rejecting the view that the liberalism with which Nolte aligned himself was innocent. Traverso associates Nolte's argument with earlier conceptions of a "world civil war" in the writings of Ernst Jünger and Carl Schmitt, as well as writings by Eric Hobsbawm, Arno J. Mayer and Dan Diner that liken the period of 1914–1945 to the Thirty Years' War.

== See also ==
- Second Thirty Years' War
