= Fascism in Its Epoch =

1963 book by Ernst Nolte

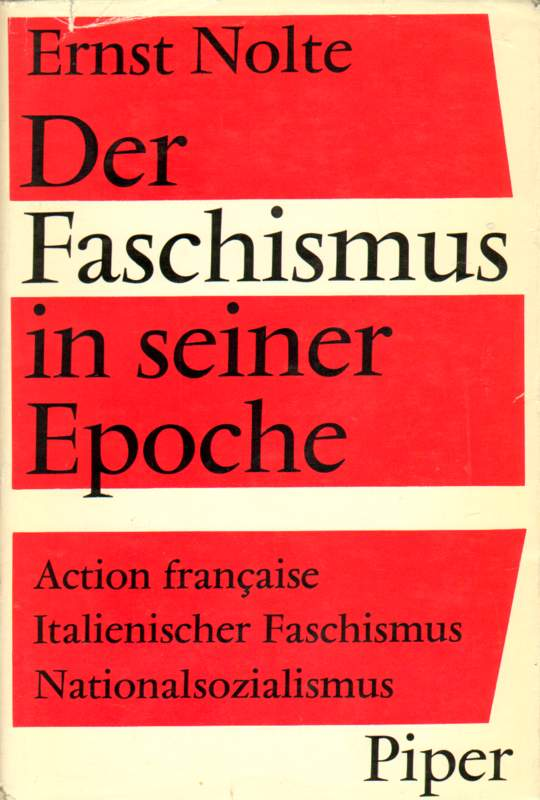
Book cover of Der Faschismus in seiner Epoche.

Fascism in Its Epoch (German: Der Faschismus in seiner Epoche), also known in English as The Three Faces of Fascism, is a 1963 book by historian and philosopher Ernst Nolte. It is widely regarded as his magnum opus and a seminal work on the history of fascism.

== Synopsis ==
The book, which was translated into English in 1965 as Three Faces of Fascism, argues that fascism arose as a form of resistance to and a reaction against modernity. Nolte's basic hypothesis and methodology were deeply rooted in the German "philosophy of history" tradition, a form of intellectual history which seeks to discover the "metapolitical dimension" of history. The "metapolitical dimension" is considered to be the history of grand ideas functioning as profound spiritual powers, which infuse all levels of society with their force. In Nolte's opinion, only those with training in philosophy can discover the "metapolitical dimension", and those who use normal historical methods miss this dimension of time. Using the methods of phenomenology, Nolte subjected German Nazism, Italian Fascism, and the French Action Française movements to a comparative analysis. Nolte's conclusion was that fascism was the great anti-movement: it was anti-liberal, anti-communist, anti-capitalist, and anti-bourgeois. In Nolte's view, fascism was the rejection of everything the modern world had to offer and was an essentially negative phenomenon. In a Hegelian dialectic, Nolte argued that the Action Française was the thesis, Italian Fascism was the antithesis, and German Nazism the synthesis of the two earlier fascist movements.

Nolte argued that fascism functioned at three levels: in the world of politics as a form of opposition to Marxism, at the sociological level in opposition to bourgeois values, and in the "metapolitical" world as "resistance to transcendence" ("transcendence" in German can be translated as the "spirit of modernity"). Nolte defined the relationship between fascism and Marxism as:

Fascism is anti-Marxism which seeks to destroy the enemy by the evolvement of a radically opposed and yet related ideology and by the use of almost identical and yet typically modified methods, always, however within the unyielding framework of national self-assertion and autonomy.

Nolte defined "transcendence" as a "metapolitical" force comprising two types of change. The first type, "practical transcendence", manifesting in material progress, technological change, political equality, and social advancement, comprises the process by which humanity liberates itself from traditional, hierarchical societies in favour of societies where all men and women are equal. The second type is "theoretical transcendence", the striving to go beyond what exists in the world towards a new future, eliminating traditional fetters imposed on the human mind by poverty, backwardness, ignorance, and class. Nolte himself defined "theoretical transcendence" as:

Theoretical transcendence may be taken to mean the reaching out of the mind beyond what exists and what can exist toward an absolute whole; in a broader sense this may be applied to all that goes beyond, that releases man from the confines of the everyday world, and which, as an "awareness of the horizon", makes it possible for him to experience the world as a whole.

Nolte cited the flight of Yuri Gagarin in 1961 as an example of "practical transcendence", of how humanity was pressing forward in its technological development and rapidly acquiring powers traditionally thought to be only the providence of the gods. Drawing upon the work of Max Weber, Friedrich Nietzsche, and Karl Marx, Nolte argued that the progress of both types of "transcendence" generates fear as the older world is swept aside by a new world and that these fears led to fascism. Nolte wrote that:

The most central of Maurras's ideas have been seen to penetrate to this level. By "monotheism" and "anti-nature" he did not imply a political process: he related these terms to the tradition of Western philosophy and religion, and left no doubt that for him they were not only adjuncts of Rousseau's notion of liberty, but also of the Christian Gospels and Parmenides' concept of being. It is equally obvious that he regarded the unity of world economics, technology, science and emancipation merely as another and more recent form of "anti-nature". It was not difficult to find a place for Hitler's ideas as a cruder and more recent expression of this schema. Maurras' and Hitler's real enemy was seen to be "freedom towards the infinite" which, intrinsic in the individual and a reality in evolution, threatens to destroy the familiar and beloved. From all this it begins to be apparent what is meant by "transcendence".

In regard to the Holocaust, Nolte contended that because Adolf Hitler identified Jews with modernity, the basic thrust of Nazi policies towards Jews had always aimed at genocide: "Auschwitz was contained in the principles of Nazi racist theory like the seed in the fruit". Nolte believed that, for Hitler, Jews represented "the historical process itself". Nolte argues that Hitler was "logically consistent" in seeking genocide of the Jews because Hitler detested modernity and identified Jews with the things that he most hated in the world. According to Nolte, "In Hitler's extermination of the Jews, it was not a case of criminals committing criminal deeds, but of a uniquely monstrous action in which principles ran riot in a frenzy of self-destruction". Nolte's theories about Nazi anti-Semitism as a rejection of modernity inspired the Israeli historian Otto Dov Kulka to argue that Nazism was an attack on "the very roots of Western civilisation, its basic values and moral foundations".

== Reception ==
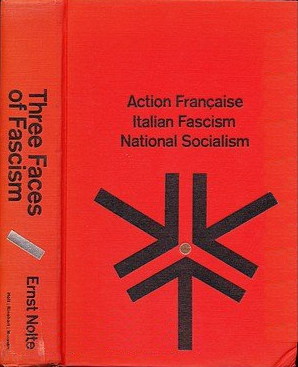
Book cover of the first American edition of Three Faces of Fascism, 1966.

The Three Faces of Fascism has been much praised as a seminal contribution to the creation of a theory of generic fascism based on a history of ideas, as opposed to the previous class-based analyses (especially the "Rage of the Lower Middle Class" thesis) that had characterized both Marxist and liberal interpretations of fascism. In the early 1960s, Nolte's book helped to facilitate a change in emphasis from totalitarianism theory, in which Nazi Germany and the Soviet Union were perceived as the regimes most nearly alike, to fascism theory, in which Fascist Italy and the Third Reich were the regimes held to be most nearly alike. In the 1960s, The Three Faces of Fascism had an immense impact on the scholarly community by advancing this new theory of generic fascism, and was described by the British historian Sir Ian Kershaw as one of the most influential history books of the 1960s. As a result of Nolte's book and the ensuing debates it caused, numerous international conferences were held to discuss generic fascism as a concept, several anthologies were put together to consider generic fascism, and a significant scholarly literature dealing with generic fascism as an intellectual phenomenon was published. British historian Roger Griffin has written that although written in arcane and obscure language, Nolte's theory of fascism as a "form of resistance to transcendence" marked an important step in the understanding of fascism, and helped to spur scholars into new avenues of research on fascism. Israeli historian Zeev Sternhell wrote in 1976 that:

The Three Faces of Fascism is an attempt to give a comprehensive explanation of fascism. The book is based on the most meticulous scholarship, the command of the material is impressive, and the methodological rigour is admirable. The work has been translated into English and French, and was acclaimed an immediate success. In reviews by, among others, Klaus Epstein, Hajo Holborn, James Joll, Walter Laqueur, George Mosse, Wolfgang Sauer, Fritz Stern and Eugen Weber, this masterly work was hailed as a very great book. Professor Nolte's work contains such a wealth of observations, information, insight and throwaway ideas that are well worth keeping that inevitably one takes issue with some.

The "issues" of which Sternhell spoke were concerns about Nolte's "phenomenological" approach to history in which Nolte claimed, for Hegelian reasons, that the particular examples he had chosen to study were valid in more general contexts. Especially objectionable to Sternhell was Nolte's insistence on focusing solely on the ideas of Adolf Hitler, Benito Mussolini, and Charles Maurras as the causal factors of fascism. Sternhell commented that the effect of this single-minded focus on ideas and personalities was that:

In some ways, Ernst Nolte's approach recalls that of Gerhard Ritter and Friedrich Meinecke: Thomas More, for Ritter, Machiavelli, for Meinecke, and now Maurras, for Nolte, are so many proofs of the universality of evil, so many proofs that it was almost by accident, by a mere conjunction of political circumstances, that the Nazis arose in Germany.

Sternhell complained that Nolte, by reducing Nazism to the ideas of Hitler, exonerated the German people. In particular, Sternhell expressed concern about the passage where Nolte wrote: "after the Führer's death, the core of the leadership of the National Socialist state snapped back, like a steel spring wound up too long, to its original position and became a body of well-meaning and cultured Central Europeans". Sternhell argued that Nolte's equating of Hitler with Nazism meant that Nazism entered and left the world with Hitler, and that with Hitler's death, the commandant of a death camp returned once more to the model citizen he was before falling under Hitler's spell. Finally, Sternhell noted that if Nazism was the "practical and violent resistance to transcendence", and if "transcendence" was a universal process affecting all societies, that Nolte had totally failed to answer why Nazism was only a German phenomenon.

Other historians were more hostile in their assessment of The Three Faces of Fascism. Criticism from the left, for example by Sir Ian Kershaw, centred on Nolte's focus on ideas as opposed to social and economic conditions as a motivating force for fascism, and that Nolte depended too much on fascist writings to support his thesis. Kershaw described Nolte's theory of fascism as "resistance to transcendence" as "mystical and mystifying". From the right, historians such as Karl Dietrich Bracher criticized the entire notion of generic fascism as intellectually invalid and argued that it was individual choice on the part of Germans, rather than Nolte's philosophical view of the "metapolitical", that produced Nazism. Bracher's magnum opus, his 1969 book Die deutsche Diktatur (The German Dictatorship), was partly written to rebut Nolte's theory of generic fascism, presenting an alternative picture of the Nazi dictatorship as a totalitarian regime created and sustained by human actions. In the early 1960s, Nolte was identified with the left, which helped to explain why The Three Faces of Fascism, by promoting a non-Marxist theory of generic fascism over the previously dominant totalitarianism paradigm (the only alternative for theorists of fascism in the 1950s had been the Marxist-inspired "Rage of the Lower Middle Class" thesis), was much welcomed in general by the non-Marxist left. Together with the work of Eugen Weber, The Three Faces of Fascism was one of the first books to furnish an extensive study of the ultra-nationalist and anti-Semitic Action Française movement of France, but many have questioned Nolte's claim that the Action Française was a fascist movement, or in the case of John Lukacs, that such a thing as generic fascism ever existed. Answering the criticism that generic fascism was an invalid concept because no other fascist movement produced anything equivalent to the Holocaust, Nolte argued that Nazism was "radical fascism".

As a professor at the University of Marburg in the late 1960s, Nolte was a target of student protesters, an experience that left him with a strong distaste for the West German left. For a time in the 1960s, all of Nolte's classes were boycotted by radical students, who demanded Nolte's dismissal, an experience that some such as John Lukacs and Charles S. Maier have credited with Nolte's radical change of views about the National Socialist period. Later in the 1970s, Nolte was to reject aspects of the theory of generic fascism that he had championed in The Three Faces of Fascism and instead moved closer to embracing totalitarian theory as a way of explaining both Nazi Germany and the Soviet Union. Nolte argued then that Nazi Germany was a "mirror image" of the Soviet Union and, with the exception of the "technical detail" of mass gassing, everything the Nazis did in Germany had already been done by the Communists in Russia.
