= The Fire: The Bombing of Germany, 1940–1945 =

2002 book by Jörg Friedrich

The Fire
- Author: Jörg Friedrich
- Original title: Der Brand
- Translator: Allison Brown
- Language: German
- Publisher: Propyläen Verlag
- Publication date: 2002
- Publication place: Germanu
- English publication date: November 2006
- Pages: 591
- ISBN: 3549071655

The Fire: The Bombing of Germany, 1940–1945 (German: Der Brand. Deutschland im Bombenkrieg 1940–1945) is a 2002 book by the German writer Jörg Friedrich.

== Summary ==
The book is a study of the indiscriminate bombings of German cities by the Allies during World War II. Friedrich writes that his ambition is to provide sober and unsentimental coverage of how the victorious side did not always adhere to the rules of war and human rights.

After the 1940 Battle of Britain, where the British and German air forces fought each other, the United Kingdom changed tactics to rely more on bombers, whose targets were not other military forces but cities and their civilian populations. Friedrich goes through how the Allies used improved bombers, radars and maps from German fire-insurance companies to carry out the various attacks, and kept detailed statistics of the destruction. Friedrich provides documentation of how Allied attacks on civilian targets were a decisive strategy for victory by working to destroy the will of the enemy population. Eventually, this tactic was so widely used that the thousands of bombers employed often were in each other's way and would drop bombs on empty ruins in already destroyed cities.

Friedrich covers subjective impressions documented among the targeted German population. He covers how the bombings rarely have been addressed throughout the decades since the war ended. He compares the British and American bomber units to the crematoria of Nazi extermination camps and killings by the paramilitary Einsatzgruppen of the German Schutzstaffel.

== Reception ==
Published by Propyläen Verlag in 2002, The Fire became a bestseller in Germany. By 2004, it had been translated to seven languages. Columbia University Press published it in English translation by Allison Brown in 2006.

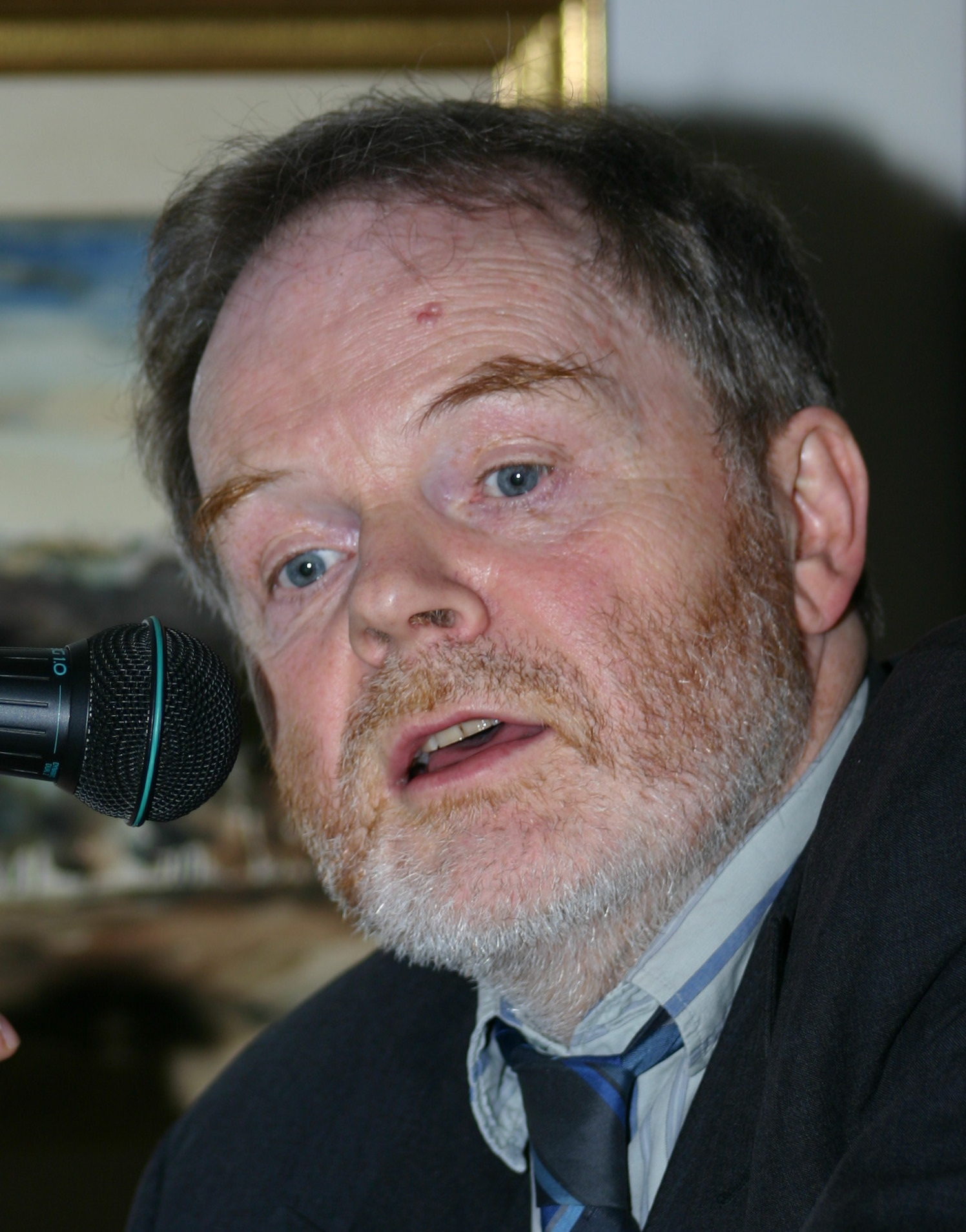
Jörg Friedrich in 2005

The bombing of civilian German targets has been a taboo subject since the war and few works address it. The Fire was received in the context of W. G. Sebald's essay "Air War and Literature" from a few years earlier, which contains an appeal to develop good ways to treat the subject in German literature. As such, it was compared to Günter Grass' 2002 novel Crabwalk, which is about an Allied attack on a ship with German refugees that killed more than 8000 civilians. These books caused controversy by bringing the subject into mainstream discourse.

Jochen Stöckmann of Deutschlandfunk wrote that Friedrich uses harsh metaphors and takes an "unambiguous and provocative stand" when he equates Allied and Nazi mass murder.

== Legacy ==
Friedrich followed The Fire with the 2003 Brandstätten, which is a photo book with documentation of the destruction of German cities, showing the burnt bodies of dead civilians. In Focus on German Studies, Jamie Zelechowski wrote that these books can be grouped as "a piece of modernist historiography" and "constitute two related attempts to find a means of representing German suffering".

== See also ==
- Porcelain: Poem on the Downfall of My City
- Strategic bombing during World War II
