= Propyläen Verlag =

Imprint of German publisher Ullstein Verlag

The Propyläen Verlag is an imprint of the German Ullstein Verlag, based in Berlin. It publishes non-fiction books, biographies, and classic editions.

== History ==
The imprint was founded in 1919 after Ullstein acquired the "Propyläen Edition" of Goethe's works, which had been started by the Georg Müller Verlag. Initially, it was headed by Emil Herz. In the 1920s, Propyläen primarily published works on history and art history, for example, the Propyläen Kunstgeschichte ("Propyläen Art History") in 24 volumes from 1923 onwards, and from 1929 to 1933 the Propyläen Weltgeschichte ("Propyläen World History") in ten volumes, edited by Walter Goetz. Classics such as Schiller and Montaigne were also published. In fiction, the novel All Quiet on the Western Front by Erich Maria Remarque was published in 1929, which was rejected by conservative circles as an indictment against war.

Various periodicals were also part of the program, such as Der Querschnitt.

During the Nazi era, the Ullstein publishing house was expropriated in 1934. The Propyläen Verlag, in contrast to Ullstein itself, continued under the same name. From 1935 to 1937, Willy Andreas and Wilhelm von Scholz published a five-volume biographical work on Die großen Deutschen ("The Great Germans") and in 1940, Willy Andreas also began a revised edition of the Propyläen Weltgeschichte, which conformed to the National Socialist view of history.

After the publishing group was returned to the Ullstein family in 1952, Albrecht Knaus took over the management of the Propyläen Verlag. Under his leadership, the publishing house acquired all rights to the complete works of Gerhart Hauptmann in 1959. With the participation of Golo Mann, work began on a new edition of the Propyläen Weltgeschichte, which was intended to express a pluralistic worldview. In the same year, Propyläen moved its headquarters, along with the entire Ullstein Group, to Darmstadt.

In 1960, the Axel Springer Verlag acquired the Propyläen publishing house along with the Ullstein Group. From 1962 to 1979, Wolf Jobst Siedler headed the publishing house; under his leadership, multi-volume works on literary history and the history of Germany and Europe were initiated. In 1967, the Ullstein Group's headquarters were moved back to Berlin. The publishing house achieved great success in 1969 with the controversial memoirs of the Nazi functionary Albert Speer, and again in 1973 with the Hitler biography by Joachim Fest.

After the merger of Ullstein Verlag with Langen Müller Verlag in 1985, Herbert Fleissner took over the management. Subsequently, Propyläen Verlag participated in the Historikerstreit regarding the assessment of National Socialism with prominent publications, such as the publication of Ernst Nolte's work Der europäische Bürgerkrieg 1917–1945 ("The European Civil War 1917–1945"). The ninth volume of the Propyläen Geschichte Deutschlands ("Propyläen History of Germany"), Der Weg in den Abgrund ("The Path to the Abyss", 1995) by Karlheinz Weißmann, a leading figure of the Neue Rechte, was withdrawn by the publisher after the editorial board distanced itself from the book.

In light of the public scandal, the Axel Springer publishing house took over the Ullstein Group again on its own in early 1996 and parted ways with Herbert Fleissner. Subsequently, the program of Propyläen Verlag, with authors such as Helmut Kohl and Peter Scholl-Latour, was increasingly focused on popular titles.
