= Timothy Mason (historian) =

English historian of Nazi Germany (1940–1990)

- Born: Timothy Wright Mason; 2 February 1940; Birkenhead, England
- Died: 5 March 1990 (aged 50); Rome, Italy
- Other name: Tim Mason
- Known for: Arguing for a "primacy of politics" approach to Nazi Germany and for World War II being caused by an economic crisis in Germany
- Spouses: Ursula Vogel (m. 1970, divorced); Simonetta Piccone (m. 1987)
- Parent(s): Walter Wright Mason, Isabel Anna (Smith) Mason

Academic background
- Education: Corpus Christi College, Oxford; St Antony's College, Oxford
- Thesis: National Socialist Policies Towards the German Working Classes, 1925–1939 (1971)
- Influences: Franz Neumann; E. P. Thompson

Academic work
- Discipline: History
- Sub-discipline: Modern German history
- Institutions: St Peter's College, Oxford
- Notable students: Peter Alter
- Main interests: Nazi Germany
- Influenced: Ian Kershaw

Timothy Wright Mason (2 February 1940 – 5 March 1990) was an English Marxist historian of Nazi Germany. He was one of the founders of the History Workshop Journal and specialised in the social history of the Third Reich. He argued for the "primacy of politics," i.e., that the Nazi government was "increasingly independent of the influence of the [German] economic ruling classes," and believed the Second World War had been triggered by an economic crisis inside Germany.

== Early life ==
Mason was born on 2 February 1940 in Birkenhead, England, the son of schoolteachers Walter Wright Mason and Isabel Anna (Smith) Mason. He was educated at Birkenhead School and the University of Oxford. He taught at Oxford from 1971 to 1984 and was twice married. He helped to found the left-wing journal History Workshop Journal. Mason specialised in the social history of the Third Reich, especially that of the working class, and his most famous books were his 1975 work Arbeiterklasse und Volksgemeinschaft (The Working Class and the National Community), a study of working-class life under the Nazis, and his 1977 book, Sozialpolitik im Dritten Reich (Social Policy in the Third Reich). Unusually for a British historian, most of his books were originally published in German.

== Role of historians ==
Mason saw his role as developing history that was flexible, humane and analytical. Mason wrote about historians' role in 1986: "If historians do have a public responsibility, if hating is part of their method and warning part of their task, it is necessary that they should hate precisely". Mason's interests as a Marxist historian were in writing a history that was not deterministic and in revising views on fascism. As part of his efforts to develop a broader picture of the Third Reich, Mason approached such topics as women in Nazi Germany, a critique of "intentionalist" views of the Third Reich and theories of generic fascism as an analytical tool.

In Social Policy in the Third Reich, Mason, unlike his counterparts in East Germany, did not confine his research mostly to resistance movements within the German working class, but sought a comprehensive picture of the life of the working class and how it was viewed both by itself and by the Nazi regime. Mason argued that the Nazi leadership was haunted by memories of the November Revolution of 1918 and so the dictatorship was prepared to make no small material allowances in the form of social policy, its reluctance to impose material shortages, and its hesitation to bring in a total-war economy.

== Primacy of politics ==
Besides his studies on the working class of Nazi Germany and Fascist Italy, Mason was noted for his break with previous Marxist interpretations of fascism that saw fascist regimes as the servant of capitalist interests. Mason argued instead for the "primacy of politics" by which he meant that although he thought that fascist regimes were still capitalist regimes, they retained "autonomy" in the political sphere and were not dictated to by capitalist interests. In a 1966 essay, Mason wrote "that both the domestic and foreign policy of the National Socialist government became, from 1936 onward, increasingly independent of the influence of the economic ruling classes, and even in some essential aspects ran contrary to their collective interests" and that "it became possible for the National Socialist state to assume a fully independent role, for the 'primacy of politics' to assert itself".

Mason used the following to support his thesis:

- After the 1936 economic crisis, German industrialists were increasingly excluded from the decision-making process.
- After 1936, with the coming of the first Four Year Plan, the state came to play a dominant role in the German economy through state-owned companies and by placing larger orders.
- The expansion of the production of armaments, supported by a very interventionist state, led capitalist enterprises that were unrelated to armaments to decline.
- The decline in effectiveness of economic lobbies in the Third Reich.
- Although every major German industrialist called for a reduction of working-class living standards from 1933 onwards, the Nazi regime always ignored such calls until 1942 and sought instead to raise working-class living standards.

Mason's "primacy of politics" approach differed from the traditional Marxist "primacy of economics" approach and involved him in the 1960s in a vigorous debate with the East German historians Eberhard Czichon, Dietrich Eichholtz and Kurt Gossweiler. The last two historians wrote if Mason was correct, it would amount to "a complete refutation of Marxist social analysis". By approaching the subject from a different angle from conservative historians such as Henry Ashby Turner and Karl Dietrich Bracher, Mason's "primacy of politics" thesis reached the same conclusion about Nazi Germany: big business served the state, rather than vice versa.

== "Flight into war" theory ==
Mason's most notable arguments were the following:

- The German working class was always opposed to the Nazi dictatorship.
- In the overheated German economy in the late 1930s, German workers could force employers to grant higher wages by leaving for another firm, which would grant their desired wage increases.
- It was a form of political resistance that forced Adolf Hitler to go to war in 1939.

Thus, the outbreak of the Second World War was caused by structural economic problems, a "flight into war" that had been imposed by a domestic crisis. The key aspects of the crisis were, according to Mason, a shaky economic recovery being threatened by a rearmament program, which was overwhelming the economy; the Nazi regime's nationalist bluster limited its options. In that way, Mason articulated a Primat der Innenpolitik ("primacy of domestic politics") view of the war's origins through the concept of social imperialism. Mason's thesis was in marked contrast to the Primat der Außenpolitik ("primacy of foreign politics") by which historians usually explained the war. Mason believed German foreign policy was driven by domestic political considerations and that the start of the war in 1939 was best understood as a "barbaric variant of social imperialism".

Mason argued, "Nazi Germany was always bent at some time upon a major war of expansion". However, Mason argued that the timing of such a war was determined by domestic political pressures, especially those relating to a failing economy, and it had nothing to do with what Hitler wanted. Mason believed that between 1936 and 1941, the state of the German economy, not Hitler's 'will' or 'intentions', was the most important cause of German foreign policy. Mason argued that the Nazi leaders were deeply haunted by the 1918 German Revolution and so were greatly opposed to any drop in the living standards of the working-class since they feared provoking a repetition of that revolution. Mason considered that by 1939, the "overheating" of the German economy, which had been caused by rearmament; the failure of various rearmament plans because of the shortages of skilled workers; industrial unrest caused by the breakdown of German social policies and the sharp drop in living standards of the German working class forced Hitler into going to war at a time and place that were not of his choosing.

Mason contended that when faced with the deep socioeconomic crisis, the Nazi leadership had decided to embark upon a ruthless 'smash and grab' foreign policy of seizing territory in Eastern Europe that could be pitilessly plundered to support living standards in Germany. Mason described German foreign policy as driven by an opportunistic "next victim" syndrome after the Anschluss in which the "promiscuity of aggressive intentions" was nurtured by every successful foreign policy move.

In Mason's opinion, the decision to sign the Molotov–Ribbentrop Pact with the Soviet Union and to attack Poland and to run of the risk of a war with the United Kingdom and France were the abandonment by Hitler of his foreign policy programme, which had been outlined in Mein Kampf, and was forced on him by his need to stop a collapsing German economy by seizing territory abroad to be plundered.

Mason's theory of a "flight into war" being imposed on Hitler generated much controversy, and in the 1980s, he conducted a series of debates with economic historian Richard Overy on the matter. Overy maintained the decision to attack Poland was not caused by structural economic problems but was the result of Hitler wanting a localised war at that particular moment. For Overy, a major problem with the Mason thesis was that it rested on the assumption that although unrecorded by the records, that information had been passed on to Hitler about Germany's economic problems. Overy argued that there was a major difference between economic pressures that were inducted by the problems of the Four Year Plan and economic motives to seize raw materials, industry and foreign reserve of neighbouring states as a way of accelerating the Four Year Plan. Overy asserted that the repressive capacity of the German state as a way of dealing with domestic unhappiness was also somewhat downplayed by Mason. Finally, Overy argued that there is considerable evidence that the state felt that it could master the economic problems of rearmament. As one civil servant put it in January 1940, "we have already mastered so many difficulties in the past, that here too, if one or other raw material became extremely scarce, ways and means will always yet be found to get out of a fix".

== Intentionist vs. functionalist historical schools ==
In a 1981 essay "Intention and Explanation: A Current Controversy About the Interpretation of National Socialism" from the book The "Fuehrer State": Myth and Reality by Gerhard Hirschfeld and Lothar Kettenacker (eds.), Mason coined the terms intentionist and functionalist as terms for historical schools regarding Nazi Germany. Mason criticised Klaus Hildebrand and Karl Dietrich Bracher for focusing too much on Hitler as an explanation for the Holocaust. Mason wrote:

In their recent essays Karl Dietrich Bracher and Klaus Hildebrand are largely concerned with the intentional actions of Hitler, which, they believe, followed with some degree of necessity from his political ideas. They formulate the question: why did the Third Reich launch a murderous war of genocide and destruction of human life on a hitherto unprecedented scale? They come in the end to the conclusion that the leaders of the Third Reich, above all Hitler, did this because they wanted to do it. This can be demonstrated by studying early manifestations of their Weltanschauung, which are wholly compatible with the worst atrocities which actually occurred in the years 1938–1945. The goal of the Third Reich was genocidal war, and, in the end, that is what National Socialism was all about. From this it seems to follow that the regime is "unique", "totalitarian", "revolutionary", "utopian", devoted to an utterly novel principle for the public order, scientific racism. The leaders, in particular Hitler, demonstrably wanted all this, and it is thus, as Hildebrand recently suggested, wrong to talk of National Socialism; we should talk of Hitlerism.

Mason wrote that part of the explanation of National Socialism required a broader look at the period, rather than focusing entirely upon Hitler. Mason wrote that as part of the investigation of the broader picture, historians should examine the economic situation of Germany in the late 1930s:

In anticipating and accounting for the war of expansion in the late 1930s the explanatory power of pressures which in their origin were economic was apparent to many actors and observers. Thus the argument that the decisive dynamic towards expansion was economic does not in the first instance depend upon the imposition of alien analytical categories on a recalcitrant body of evidence, nor in the first instance upon the theoretical construction of connections between "the economy" and "politics". For the years 1938–39 a very wide variety of different types of sources materials discuss explicitly and at length the growing economic crisis in Germany, and many of the authors of these memoranda, books and articles could see the need to speculate then about the relationship between this crisis and the likelihood of war. The view that this was a major problem was common to many top military and political leaders in Germany, to top officials in Britain, to some German industrialists and civil servants, to German exiles and members of the conservative resistance, and to non-German bankers and academics.

== Criticism of Ernst Nolte on the Holocaust ==
Mason was a leading advocate of comparative studies in fascism and, in the 1980s, strongly criticised the German philosopher Ernst Nolte for comparing the Holocaust to events that Mason regarded as totally unrelated to Nazi Germany, such as the Armenian genocide and the Khmer Rouge genocide. By contrast, Mason argued that there was much to learn by comparing Nazi Germany and Fascist Italy to produce a theory of generic fascism. In Mason's view, Nazism was only part of a wider fascist phenomenon:

If we can do without much of the original contents of the concept of "fascism", we cannot do without comparison. "Historicization" may easily become a recipe for provincialism. And the moral absolutes of Habermas, however politically and didactically impeccable, also carry a shadow of provincialism, as long as they fail to recognize that fascism was a continental phenomenon, and that Nazism was a peculiar part of something much larger. Pol Pot, the rat torture and the fate of the Armenians are all extraneous to any serious discussion of Nazism; Mussolini's Italy is not.

== Denouncing Thatcher government and leaving Britain ==
In 1985, Mason decided that the government of Margaret Thatcher was the harbinger of fascism, advised trade union leaders to start making preparations to go underground and moved to Italy. After battling severe depression for many years, he died by suicide in Rome on 5 March 1990.

== Works ==
- "Some Origins of the Second World War" pages 67–87 from Past and Present, Volume 29, 1964.
- "Labour in the Third Reich" pages 187–191 from Past and Present, Volume 33, 1966.
- "Nineteenth Century Cromwell" pages 187–191 from Past and Present, Volume 49, 1968.
- "Primacy of Politics: Politics and Economics in National Socialist Germany" from The Nature of Fascism edited by Stuart J. Woolf, 1968.
- Arbeiterklasse und Volksgemeinschaft: Dokumente und Materialien zur deutschen Arbeiterpolitik, 1936–39, 1975.
- "Innere Krise und Angriffskrieg, 1938–1939" pages 158–188 from Wirtschaft und Rüstung am Vorabend des Zweiten Weltkrieges edited by F. Forstermeier and H.E. Volkmann, Düsseldorf, 1975.
- Sozialpolitik im Dritten Reich: Arbeiterklasse und Volksgemeinschaft, 1977.
- "Women in Germany, 1925–40: Family, Welfare, and Work" pages 74–113 from History Workshop Journal, Issue 1, 1976 and pages 5–32 from History Workshop Journal, Issue 2, 1976.
- "National Socialism and the German Working Class, 1925 – May 1933" pages 49–93 from New German Critique Volume 11, 1977.
- "Intention and Explanation: A Current Controversy about the Interpretation of National Socialism", in: Gerhard Hirschfeld and Lothar Kettenacker, eds., The "Führer State": Myth and Reality. Studies on the Structure and Policies of the Third Reich (Stuttgart: Klett-Cotta, 1981), 23-42.
- "Worker's Opposition in Nazi Germany" pages 120–137 from History Workshop Journal, Issue II, 1981
- "Die Bändigung der Arbeiterklasse im nationalsozialistischen Deutschland", pages 11–53 from Carola Sachse/Tilla Siegel/Hasso Spode/Wolfgang Spohn, Angst, Belohnung, Zucht und Ordnung. Herrschaftsmechanismen im Nationalsozialismus, Opladen 1982.
- "Injustice and Resistance: Barrington Moore and the Reaction of the German Workers to Nazism" from Ideas into Politics: Aspects of European History, 1880–1950 edited by R.J. Bullen, Hartmut Pogge von Strandmann and A.B. Polonsky, 1984.
- "Massenwiderstand ohne Organisation: Streiks im faschistischen Italien und NS-Deutschland" pages 1997–212 from Gewerkschafliche Monatshefte, Volume 32, 1984.
- "Arbeiter ohne Gewerkschaften: Massenwiderstand im NS-Deutschland und im faschistischen Italien" pages 28–35 from Journal für Geschichte, 1985.
- "History Workshop" pages 175–1986 from Passato e Presente, Volume 8, 1985.
- "Il nazismo come professione" pages 18–19 from Rinascita, Volume 18, 18 May 1985.
- "The Great Economic History Show" pages 129–154 from History Workshop Journal, Volume 21, 1986.
- "Italy and Modernisation" pages 127–147 from History Workshop Journal, Volume 25, 1988.
- "Gli scioperi di Torino del Marzo' 43" from L'Italia nella seconda guerra mondiale e nella resistenza, edited by Francesca Ferratini Tosi, Gatano Grasso, and Massimo Legnain, 1988.
- "Debate: Germany, `Domestic Crisis and War in 1939': Comment 2" pages 205–221 from Past and Present, Volume 122, 1989 reprinted as “Debate: Germany, `domestic crisis’ and the War in 1939” from The Origins of The Second World War edited by Patrick Finney, Edward Arnold: London, United Kingdom, 1997, ISBN 0-340-67640-X..
- "Whatever Happened to `Fascism'?" pages 89–98 from Radical History Review, Volume 49, 1991.
- "The Domestic Dynamics of Nazi Conquests: A Response to Critics" from Re-evaluating the Third Reich edited by Thomas Childers and Jane Caplan, 1993.
- Nazism, Fascism, and the Working Class: Essays by Tim Mason, edited by Jane Caplan, 1995.
