= History of Germany during World War I =

During World War I, the German Empire was one of the Central Powers. It began participation in the conflict after the declaration of war against Serbia by its ally, Austria-Hungary. German forces fought the Allies on both the eastern and western fronts, although German territory itself remained relatively safe from widespread invasion for most of the war, except for a brief period in 1914 when East Prussia was invaded. A tight blockade imposed by the Royal Navy caused severe food shortages in the cities, especially in the winter of 1916–17, known as the Turnip Winter. At the end of the war, Germany's defeat and widespread popular discontent triggered the German Revolution of 1918–1919 which overthrew the monarchy and established the Weimar Republic.

== Background ==
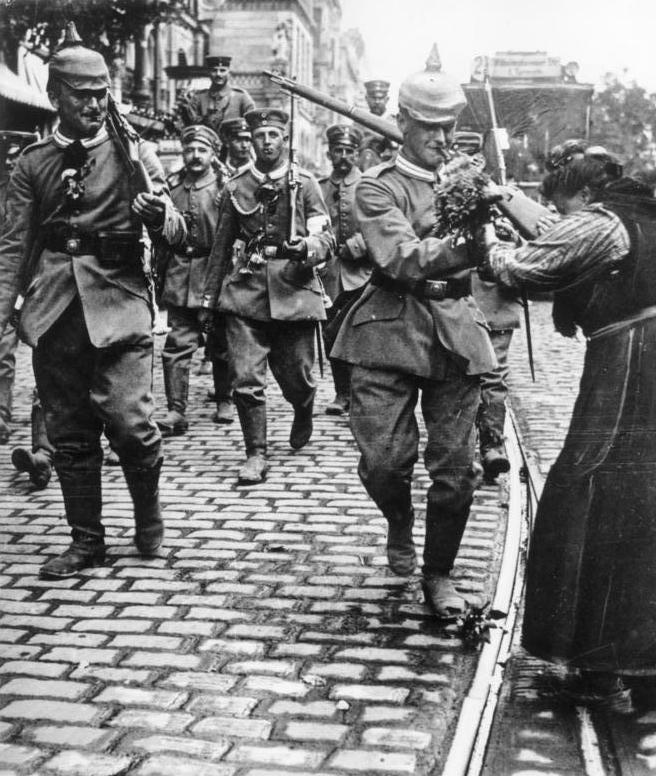
World War I mobilization, 1 August 1914

Germany's population had already responded to the outbreak of war in 1914 with a complex mix of emotions, in a similar way to the emotions of the population in the United Kingdom; notions of universal enthusiasm known as the Spirit of 1914 have been challenged by more recent scholarship. The German government, dominated by the Junkers, saw the war as a way to end being surrounded by hostile powers France, Russia and Britain. The war was presented inside Germany as the chance for the nation to secure "our place under the sun," as the Foreign Minister Bernhard von Bülow had put it, which was readily supported by prevalent nationalism among the public. The German establishment hoped the war would unite the public behind the monarchy, and lessen the threat posed by the dramatic growth of the Social Democratic Party of Germany, which had been the most vocal critic of the Kaiser in the Reichstag before the war. Despite its membership in the Second International, the Social Democratic Party of Germany ended its differences with the Imperial government and abandoned its principles of internationalism to support the war effort. The German state spent 170 billion Marks during the war. The money was raised by borrowing from banks and from public bond drives. Symbolic purchasing of nails which were driven into public wooden crosses spurred the aristocracy and middle class to buy bonds. These bonds became worthless with the 1923 hyperinflation.

It soon became apparent that Germany was not prepared for a war lasting more than a few months. At first, little was done to regulate the economy on a wartime footing, and the German war economy would remain badly organized throughout the war. The country depended on imports of food and raw materials, which were stopped by the British blockade of Germany. First food prices were limited, then rationing was introduced. The winter of 1916/17 was called the "turnip winter" because the potato harvest was poor and people ate animal food, including vile-tasting turnips. From August 1914 to mid-1919, excess deaths compared to peacetime caused by malnutrition and high rates of exhaustion and disease and despair came to about 474,000 civilians excluding "Alsace-Lorraine and the Polish provinces".

=== Government ===
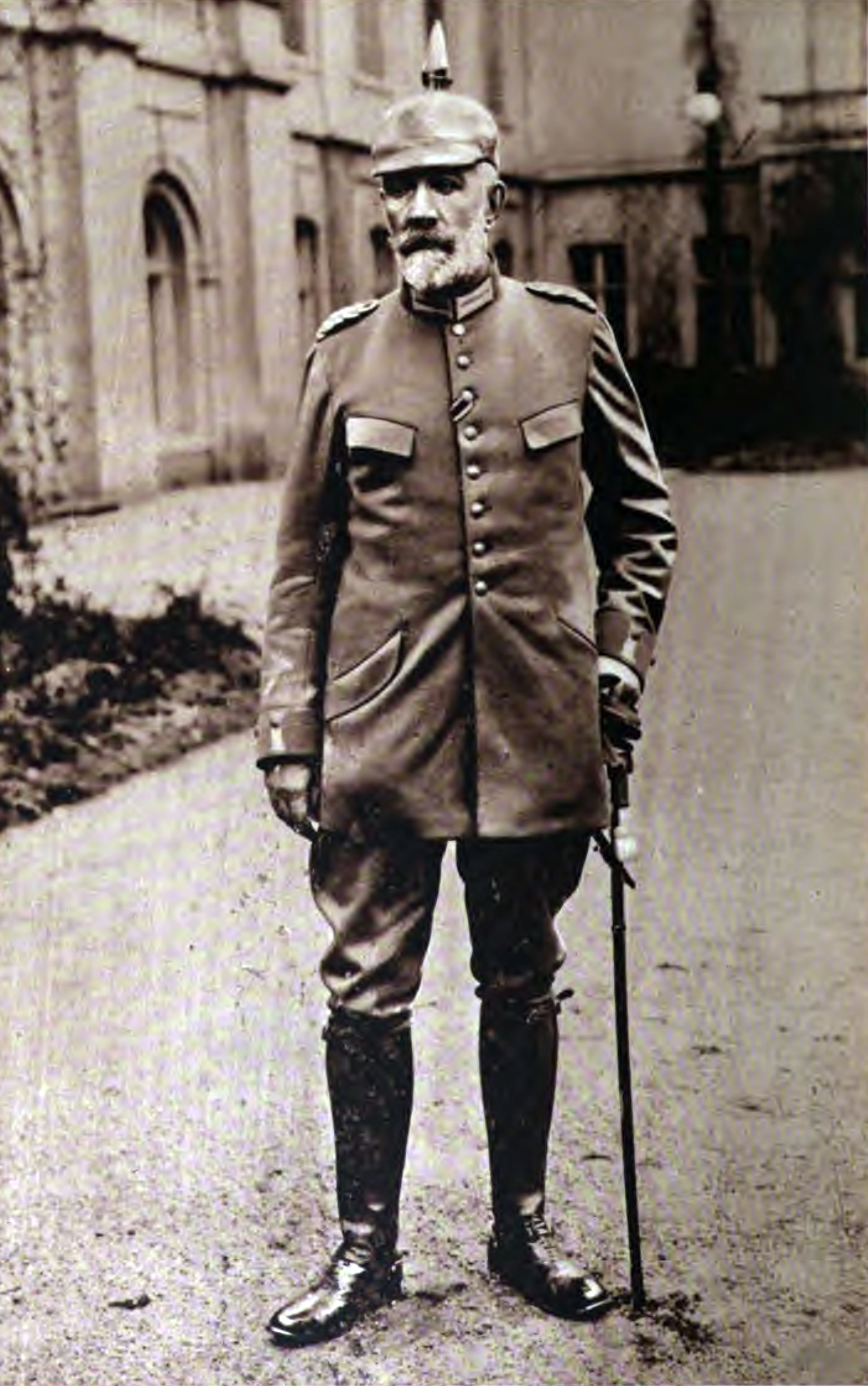
Bethmann Hollweg in uniform. He never served in the army, but after the war started, he was appointed to an honorary rank with a general's uniform.

According to the biographer, Konrad H. Jarausch, a primary concern for Bethmann Hollweg in July 1914 was the steady growth of Russian power and the growth of British and French military collaboration. Under these circumstances he decided to run what he considered a calculated risk to back Vienna in a local war against Serbia, while risking a big war with Russia. He calculated that France would not support Russia. It failed when Russia decided on general mobilization. By rushing through Belgium, Germany expanded the war to include England. Bethmann Hollweg thus failed to keep France and Britain out of the conflict.

The crisis came to a head on 5 July 1914 when Count Hoyos Mission arrived in Berlin in response to Austro-Hungarian Foreign Minister Leopold Berchtold's plea for friendship. Bethmann Hollweg was assured that Britain would not intervene in the frantic diplomatic rounds across the European powers. Reliance on that assumption encouraged Austria to demand Serbian concessions. His main concern was Russian border manoeuvres, conveyed by his ambassadors at a time when Raymond Poincaré himself was preparing a secret mission to St Petersburg. He wrote to Count Sergey Sazonov, "Russian mobilisation measures would compel us to mobilise and that then European war could scarcely be prevented."

Following the assassination of Archduke Franz Ferdinand in Sarajevo on 28 June 1914, Bethmann Hollweg and his foreign minister, Gottlieb von Jagow, were instrumental in assuring Austria-Hungary of Germany's unconditional support, regardless of Austria's actions against Serbia. While Grey was suggesting mediation between Austria-Hungary and Serbia, Bethmann Hollweg wanted Austria-Hungary to attack Serbia and so he tampered with the British message and deleted the last line of the letter: "Also, the whole world here is convinced, and I hear from my colleagues that the key to the situation lies in Berlin, and that if Berlin seriously wants peace, it will prevent Vienna from following a foolhardy policy.

When the Austro-Hungarian ultimatum was presented to Serbia, Kaiser Wilhelm II ended his vacation and hurried back to Berlin.

When Wilhelm arrived at the Potsdam station late in the evening of July 26, he was met by a pale, agitated, and somewhat fearful Chancellor. Bethmann Hollweg's apprehension stemmed not from the dangers of the looming war, but rather from his fear of the Kaiser's wrath when the extent of his deceptions were revealed. The Kaiser's first words to him were suitably brusque: "How did it all happen?" Rather than attempt to explain, the Chancellor offered his resignation by way of apology. Wilhelm refused to accept it, muttering furiously, "You've made this stew, now you're going to eat it!"

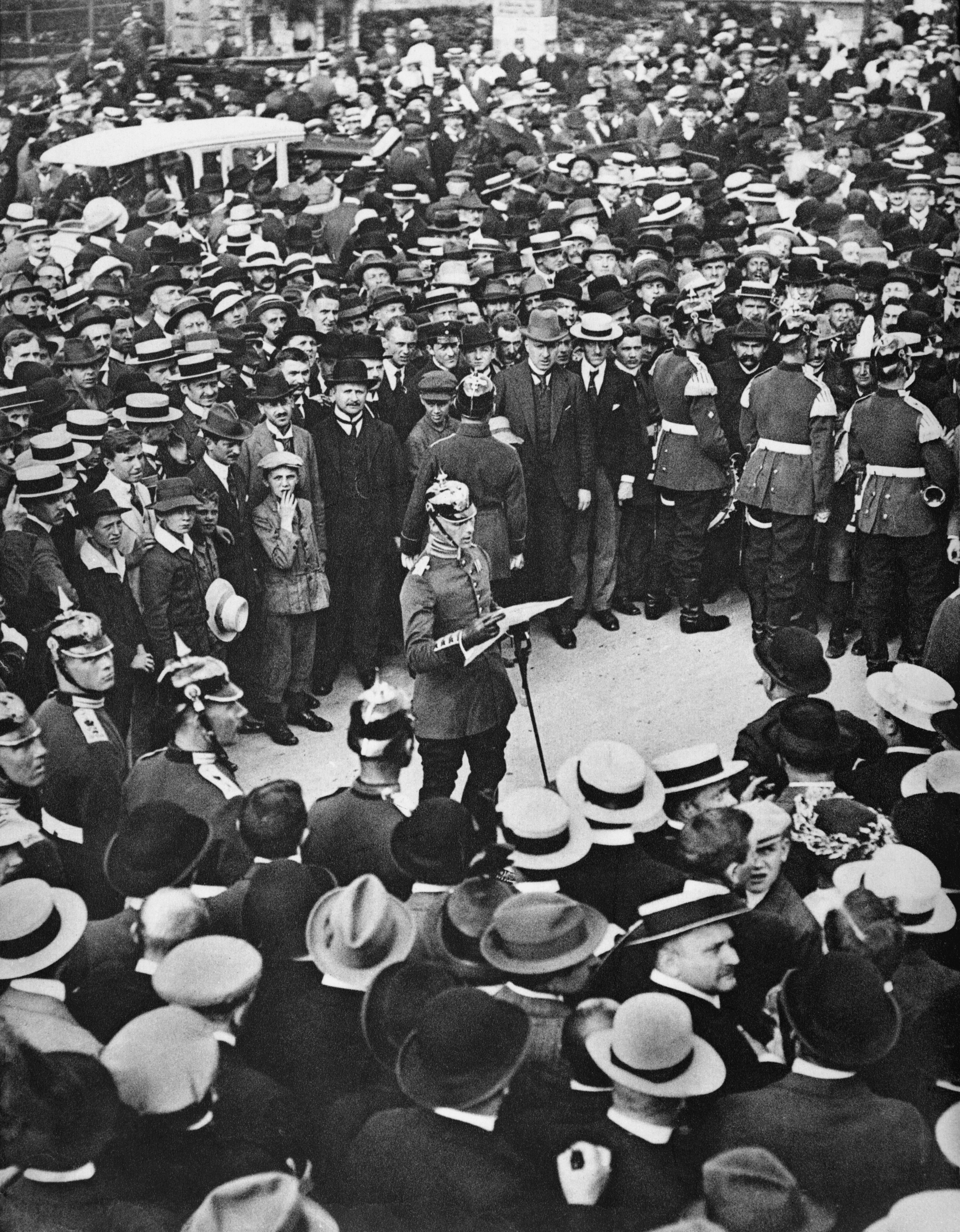
Mobilization order is read out in Berlin, 1 August 1914

Bethmann Hollweg, much of whose foreign policy before the war had been guided by his desire to establish good relations with Britain, was particularly upset by Britain's declaration of war following the German violation of Belgium's neutrality during its invasion of France. He reportedly asked the departing British Ambassador Edward Goschen how Britain could go to war over a "scrap of paper" ("ein Fetzen Papier"), which was the 1839 Treaty of London guaranteeing Belgium's neutrality.

Bethmann Hollweg sought public approval from a declaration of war. His civilian colleagues pleaded for him to register some febrile protest, but he was frequently outflanked by the military leaders, who played an increasingly important role in the direction of all German policy. However, according to historian Fritz Fischer, writing in the 1960s, Bethmann Hollweg made more concessions to the nationalist right than had previously been thought. He supported the ethnic cleansing of Poles from the Polish Border Strip as well as Germanisation of Polish territories by settlement of German colonists.

A few weeks after the war began Bethmann presented the Septemberprogramm, which was a survey of ideas from the elite should Germany win the war. Bethmann Hollweg, with all credibility and power now lost, conspired over Falkenhayn's head with Paul von Hindenburg and Erich Ludendorff (respectively commander-in-chief and chief of staff for the Eastern Front) for an Eastern Offensive. They then succeeded, in August 1916 in securing Falkenhayn's replacement by Hindenburg as Chief of the General Staff, with Ludendorff as First Quartermaster-General (Hindenburg's deputy). Thereafter, Bethmann Hollweg's hopes for US President Woodrow Wilson's mediation at the end of 1916 came to nothing. Over Bethmann Hollweg's objections, Hindenburg and Ludendorff forced the adoption of unrestricted submarine warfare in March 1917, adopted as a result of Henning von Holtzendorff's memorandum. Bethmann Hollweg had been a reluctant participant and opposed it in cabinet. The US entered the war in April 1917.

According to Wolfgang J. Mommsen, Bethmann Hollweg weakened his position by failing to establish good control over public relations. To avoid highly intensive negative publicity, he conducted much of his diplomacy in secret, thereby failing to build strong support for it. In 1914 he was willing to risk a world war to win public support. Bethmann Hollweg remained in office until July 1917, when a Reichstag revolt resulted in the passage of Matthias Erzberger's Peace Resolution by an alliance of the Social Democratic, Progressive, and Centre parties. Opposition to him from high-level military leaders, including Hindenburg and Ludendorff, who both threatened to resign was exacerbated when Bethmann Hollweg convinced the Emperor to agree publicly to the introduction of equal male suffrage in Prussian state elections. The combination of political and military opposition forced Bethmann Hollweg's resignation and replacement by Georg Michaelis.

== 1914–1915 ==
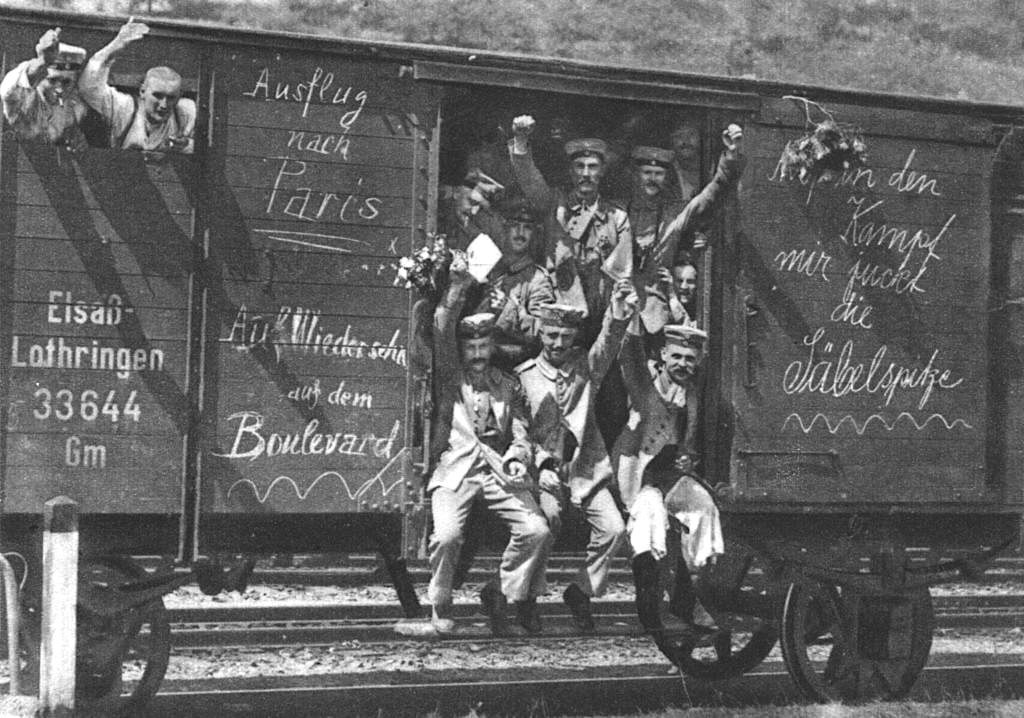
German soldiers on the way to the front in 1914. A message on the freight car spells out "Trip to Paris"; early in the war, all sides expected the conflict to be a short one.

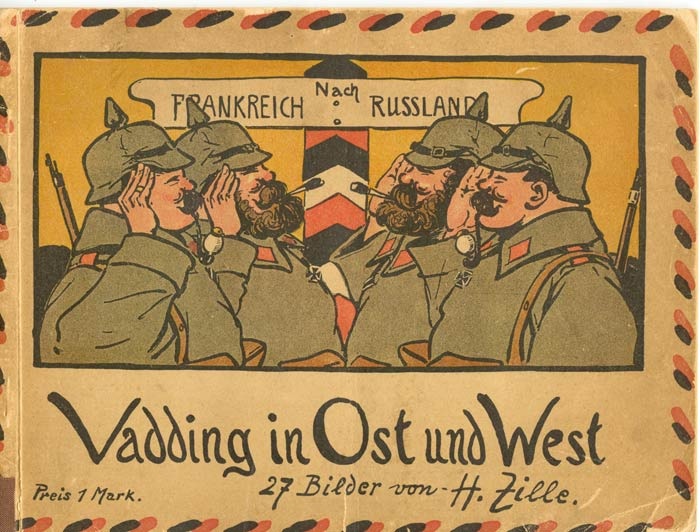
In this contemporary drawing by Heinrich Zille, the German soldiers bound westwards to France and those bound eastwards to Russia smilingly salute each other.

The German army opened the war on the Western Front with a modified version of the Schlieffen Plan, designed to quickly attack France through neutral Belgium before turning southwards to encircle the French army on the German border. The Belgians fought back, and sabotaged their rail system to delay the Germans. The Germans did not expect this and were delayed, and responded with systematic reprisals on civilians, killing nearly 6,000 Belgian noncombatants, including women and children, and burning 25,000 houses and buildings. The plan called for the right flank of the German advance to converge on Paris and initially, the Germans were very successful, particularly in the Battle of the Frontiers (14–24 August). By 12 September, the French with assistance from the British forces halted the German advance east of Paris at the First Battle of the Marne (5–12 September). The last days of this battle signified the end of mobile warfare in the west. The French offensive into Germany launched on 7 August with the Battle of Mulhouse had limited success.

In the east, only one Field Army defended East Prussia and when Russia attacked in this region it diverted German forces intended for the Western Front. Germany defeated Russia in a series of battles collectively known as the First Battle of Tannenberg (17 August – 2 September), but this diversion exacerbated problems of insufficient speed of advance from rail-heads not foreseen by the German General Staff. The Central Powers were thereby denied a quick victory and forced to fight a war on two fronts. The German army had fought its way into a good defensive position inside France and had permanently incapacitated 230,000 more French and British troops than it had lost itself. Despite this, communications problems and questionable command decisions cost Germany the chance of obtaining an early victory.

== 1916 ==
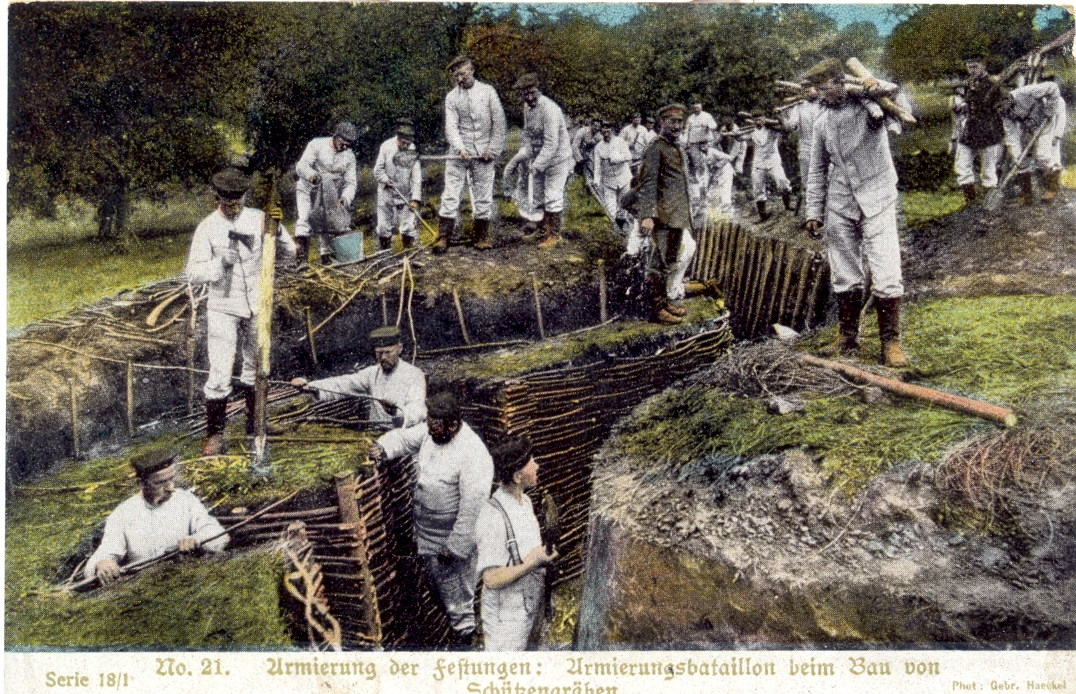
German soldiers digging trenches

1916 was characterized by two great battles on the Western front, at Verdun and the Somme. They each lasted most of the year, achieved minimal gains, and drained away the best soldiers of both sides. Verdun became the iconic symbol of the murderous power of modern defensive weapons, with 280,000 German casualties, and 315,000 French. At the Somme, there were over 400,000 German casualties, against over 600,000 Allied casualties. At Verdun, the Germans attacked what they considered to be a weak French salient which nevertheless the French would defend for reasons of national pride. The Somme was part of a multinational plan of the Allies to attack on different fronts simultaneously. German woes were also compounded by Russia's grand "Brusilov offensive", which diverted more soldiers and resources. Although the Eastern front was held to a standoff and Germany suffered fewer casualties than their allies with ~150,000 of the ~770,000 Central powers casualties, the simultaneous Verdun offensive stretched the German forces committed to the Somme offensive. German experts are divided in their interpretation of the Somme. Some say it was a stand-off, but most see it as a British victory and argue it marked the point at which German morale began a permanent decline and the strategic initiative was lost, along with irreplaceable veterans and confidence.

== 1917 ==
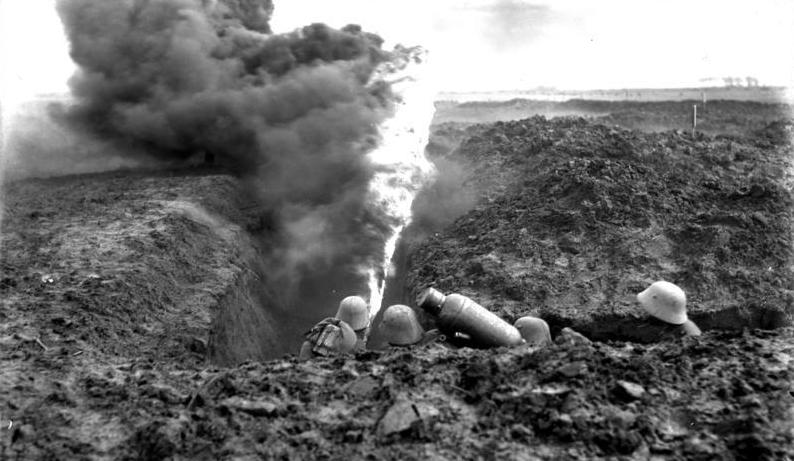
German soldiers operating a flamethrower in 1917

In early 1917 the SPD leadership became concerned about the activity of its anti-war left-wing which had been organising as the Sozialdemokratische Arbeitsgemeinschaft (SAG, "Social Democratic Working Group"). On 17 January they expelled them, and in April 1917 the left wing went on to form the Independent Social Democratic Party of Germany (German: Unabhängige Sozialdemokratische Partei Deutschlands). The remaining faction was then known as the Majority Social Democratic Party of Germany. This happened as the enthusiasm for war was fading in light of the enormous numbers of casualties, the dwindling supply of manpower, the mounting difficulties on the home front, and the never-ending flow of casualty reports. A grimmer and grimmer attitude began to prevail amongst the general population. The only highlight was the first use of mustard gas in warfare, in the Battle of Ypres.

Subsequently, morale was helped by victories against Serbia, Romania, Italy and Russia, which constituted great gains for the Central Powers. Morale was at its greatest since 1914 at the end of 1917 and beginning of 1918, with the defeat of Russia following her uprising in revolution, and the German people braced themselves for what General Erich Ludendorff said would be the "Peace Offensive" in the west.

== 1918 ==
In spring 1918, Germany realized that time was running out. It prepared for the decisive strike with new armies and new tactics, hoping to win the war on the Western front before millions of American soldiers appeared in battle. General Erich Ludendorff and Field Marshal Paul von Hindenburg had full control of the army, they had a large supply of reinforcements moved from the Eastern front, and they trained storm troopers with new tactics to race through the trenches and attack the enemy's command and communications centers. The new tactics would indeed restore mobility to the Western front, but the German army was over-optimistic.

During the winter of 1917-18 it was "quiet" on the Western Front—British casualties averaged "only" 3,000 a week. Serious attacks were impossible in the winter because of the deep caramel-thick mud. Quietly the Germans brought in their best soldiers from the eastern front, selected elite storm troops, and trained them all winter long in the new tactics. With stopwatch timing, the German artillery would lay down a sudden, fearsome barrage just ahead of its advancing infantry. Moving in small units, firing light machine guns, the stormtroopers would bypass enemy strong points, and head directly for critical bridges, command posts, supply dumps and, above all, artillery batteries. By cutting enemy communications they would paralyze response in the critical first half hour. By silencing the artillery they would break the enemy's firepower. Rigid schedules sent in two more waves of infantry to mop up the strong points that had been bypassed. The shock troops frightened and disoriented the first line of defenders, who would flee in panic. In one instance an easy-going Allied regiment broke and fled; reinforcements rushed in on bicycles. The panicky soldiers seized the bikes and beat an even faster retreat. The stormtrooper tactics provided mobility, but not increased firepower. Eventually—in 1939 and 1940—the formula would be perfected with the aid of dive bombers and tanks, but in 1918 the Germans as yet lacked both.

Ludendorff erred by attacking the British first in 1918, instead of the French. He mistakenly thought the British to be too uninspired to respond rapidly to the new tactics. The exhausted, dispirited French perhaps might have folded. The German assaults on the British were ferocious—the most extensive of the entire war. At the Somme River in March, 63 divisions attacked in a blinding fog. No matter, the German lieutenants had memorized their maps and their orders. The British lost 270,000 men, fell back 40 miles, and then held. They quickly learned how to handle the new German tactics: fall back, abandon the trenches, let the attackers overextend themselves, and then counterattack. They gained an advantage in firepower from their artillery and from tanks used as mobile pillboxes that could retreat and counterattack at will. In April Ludendorff hit the British again, inflicting 305,000 casualties—but he lacked the reserves to follow up. In total, Ludendorff launched five major attacks between March and July, inflicting a million British and French casualties. The Western Front now had opened up—the trenches were still there but the importance of mobility now reasserted itself. The Allies held. The Germans suffered twice as many casualties as they inflicted, including most of their precious stormtroopers. The new German replacements were under-aged youth or embittered middle-aged family men in poor condition. They were not inspired by the enthusiasm of 1914, nor thrilled with battle—they hated it, and some began talking of revolution. Ludendorff could not replace his losses, nor could he devise a new brainstorm that might somehow snatch victory from the jaws of defeat. The British likewise were bringing in reinforcements from the whole Empire, but since their home front was in good condition and they could sight inevitable victory, their morale was higher. The great German spring offensive was a race against time, for everyone could see the Americans were training millions of fresh soldiers who would eventually arrive on the Western Front.

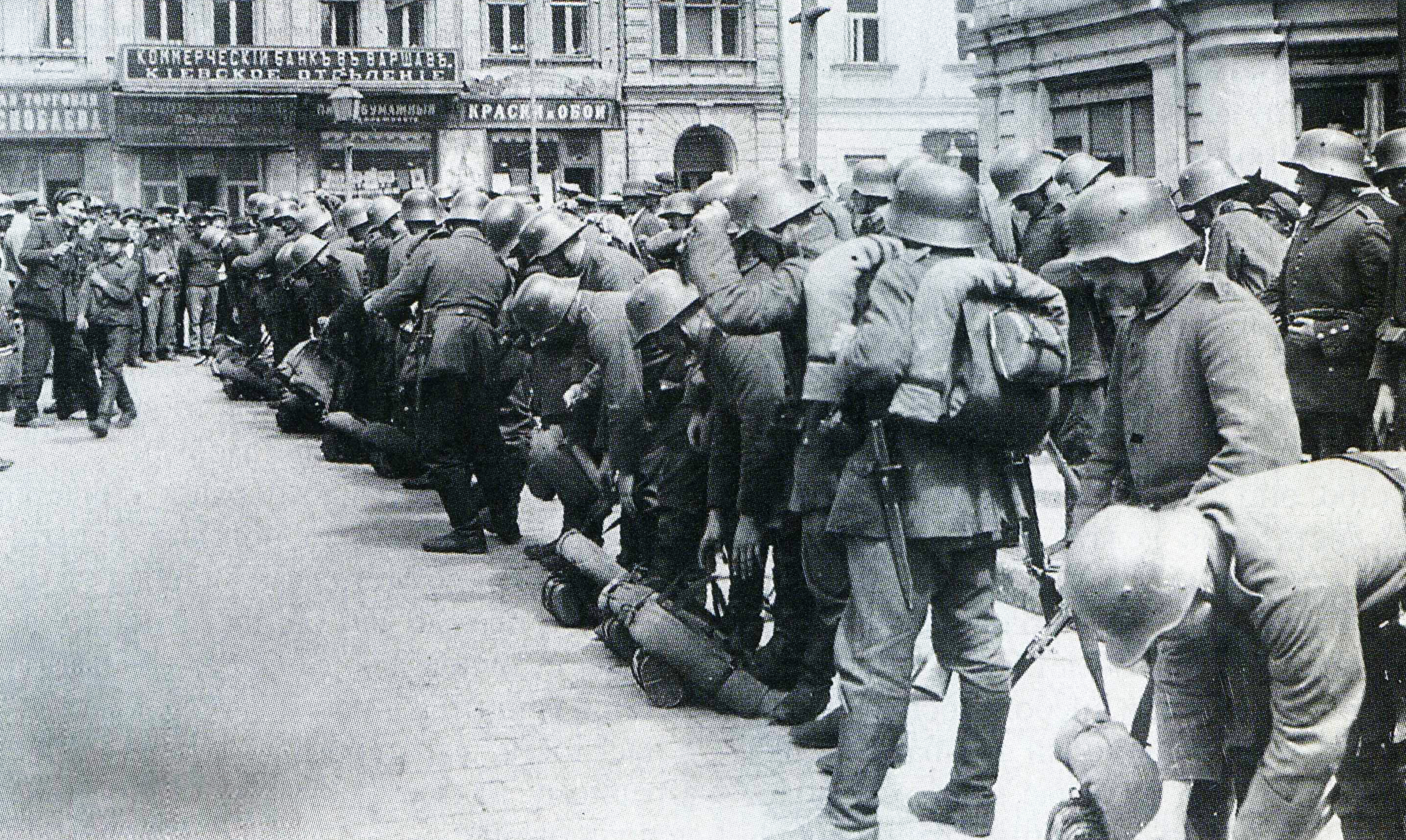
German troops in Kiev, March 1918

The attrition warfare now caught up to both sides. Germany had used up all the best soldiers they had, and still had not conquered much territory. The British likewise were bringing in youths of 18 and unfit and middle-aged men, but they could see the Americans arriving steadily. The French had also nearly exhausted their manpower. Berlin had calculated it would take months for the Americans to ship all their soldiers and equipment—but the U.S. troops arrived much sooner, as they left their heavy equipment behind, and relied on British and French artillery, tanks, airplanes, trucks and equipment. Berlin also assumed that Americans were fat, undisciplined and unaccustomed to hardship and severe fighting. They soon realized their mistake. The Germans reported that "[t]he qualities of the [Americans] individually may be described as remarkable. They are physically well set up, their attitude is good... They lack at present only training and experience to make formidable adversaries. The men are in fine spirits and are filled with naive assurance."

By September 1918, the Central Powers were exhausted from fighting, the American forces were pouring into France at a rate of 10,000 a day, the British Empire was mobilised for war peaking at 4.5 million soldiers and 4,000 tanks on the Western Front. The decisive Allied counteroffensive, known as the Hundred Days Offensive, began on 8 August 1918—what Ludendorff called the "Black Day of the German army." The Allied armies advanced steadily as German defenses faltered.

Although German armies were still on enemy soil as the war ended, the generals, the civilian leadership—and indeed the soldiers and the people—knew all was hopeless. They started looking for scapegoats. The hunger and popular dissatisfaction with the war precipitated revolution throughout Germany. By 11 November Germany had virtually surrendered, the Kaiser and all the royal families had abdicated, and the German Empire fell.

== Home front ==
=== War fever ===
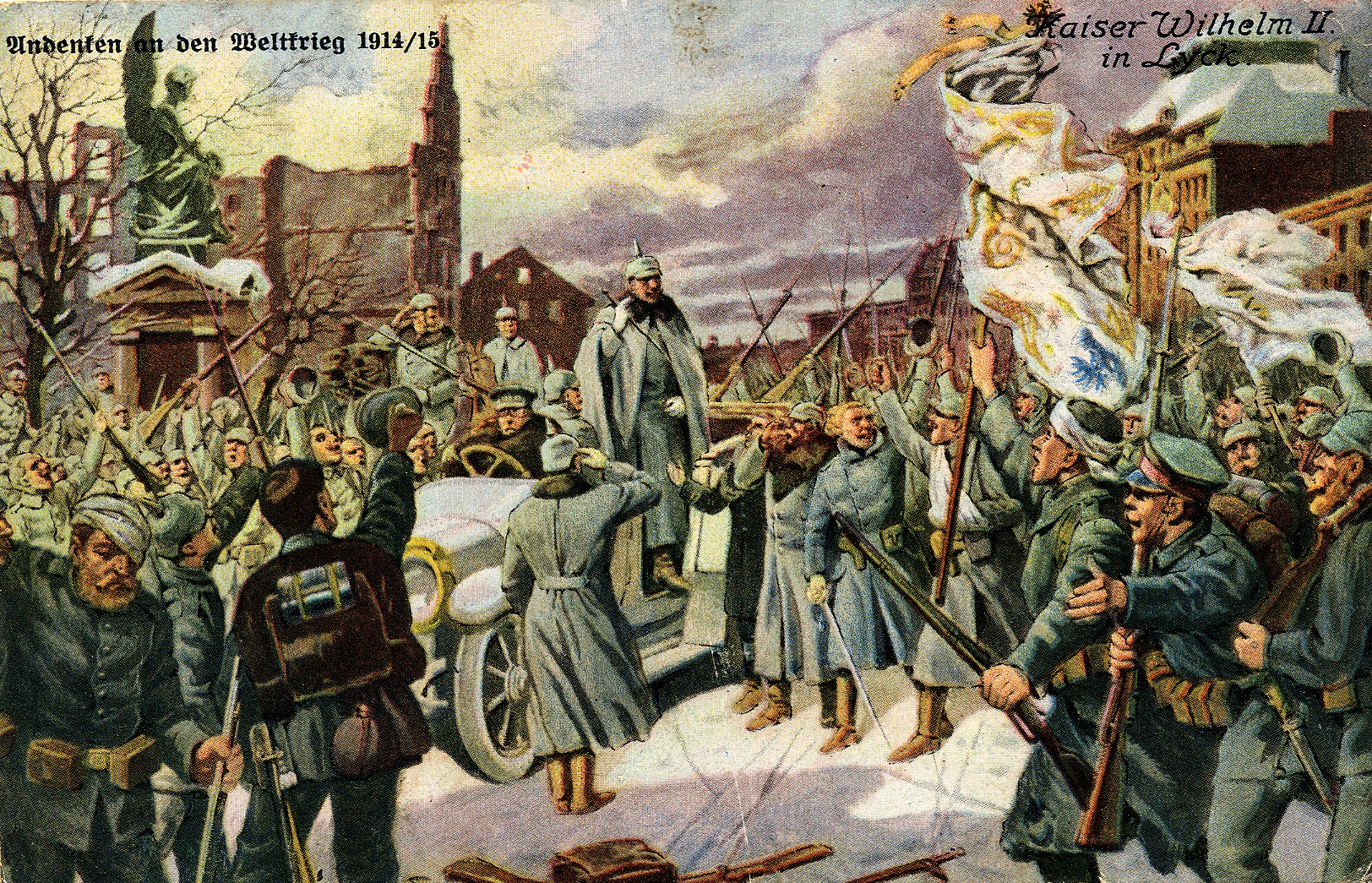
Military propaganda postcard: Wounded soldiers cheer the German Emperor Wilhelm II, who is in a car.

The "spirit of 1914" was the enthusiastic support of mostly the educated middle- and upper-class elements of the population for the war when it first broke out in 1914. In the Reichstag, the vote for credits was unanimous, including from the Social Democrats. One professor testified to a "great single feeling of moral elevation or soaring of religious sentiment, in short, the ascent of a whole people to the heights." At the same time, there was a level of anxiety; most commentators predicted a short victorious war – but that hope was dashed in a matter of weeks, as the invasion of Belgium bogged down and the French Army held before Paris. The Western Front became a killing machine, as neither army moved more than a few hundred yards at a time. Industry in late 1914 was in chaos, unemployment soared while it took months to reconvert to munitions productions. In 1916, the Hindenburg Program called for the mobilization of all economic resources to produce artillery, shells, and machine guns. Church bells and copper roofs were ripped out and melted down.

According to historian William H. MacNeil:

By 1917, after three years of war, the various groups and bureaucratic hierarchies which had been operating more or less independently of one another in peacetime (and not infrequently had worked at cross-purposes) were subordinated to one (and perhaps the most effective) of their number: the General Staff. Military officers controlled civilian government officials, the staffs of banks, cartels, firms, and factories, engineers and scientists, working men, farmers - indeed almost every element in German society; and all efforts were directed in theory, and in large degree also in practice, to forwarding the war effort.

=== Economy ===
Germany had no plans for mobilizing its civilian economy for the war effort, and no stockpiles of food or critical supplies had been made. Germany had to improvise rapidly. All major political sectors initially supported the war, including the Socialists.

Early in the war industrialist Walther Rathenau held senior posts in the Raw Materials Department of the War Ministry, while becoming chairman of AEG upon his father's death in 1915. Rathenau played the key role in convincing the War Ministry to set up the War Raw Materials Department (Kriegsrohstoffabteilung - 'KRA'); he was in charge of it from August 1914 to March 1915 and established the basic policies and procedures. His senior staff were on loan from industry. KRA focused on raw materials threatened by the British blockade, as well as supplies from occupied Belgium and France. It set prices and regulated the distribution to vital war industries. It began the development of ersatz raw materials. KRA suffered many inefficiencies caused by the complexity and selfishness KRA encountered from commerce, industry, and the government.

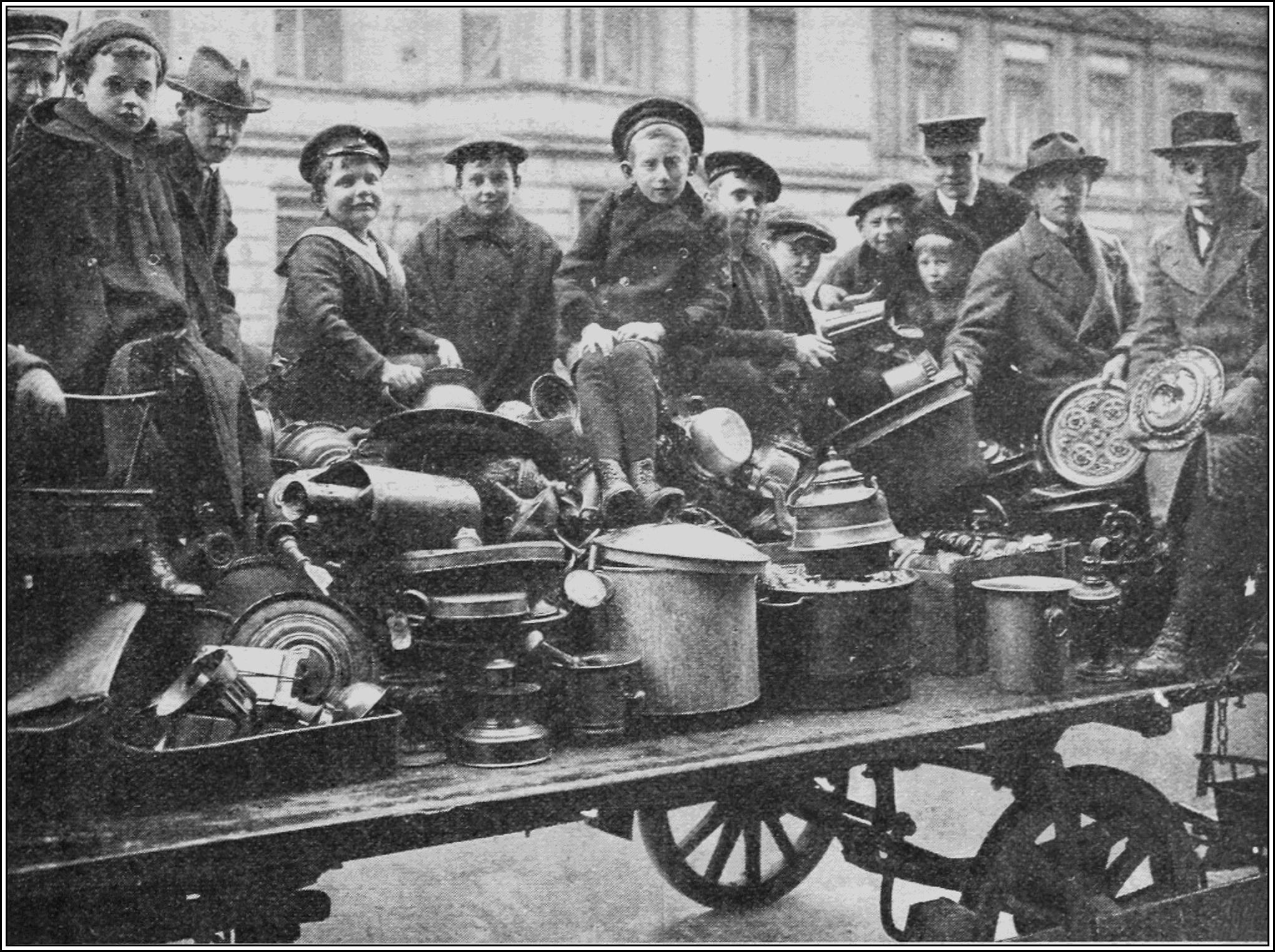
Collecting scrap metal for the war effort, 1916

While the KRA handled critical raw materials, the crisis over food supplies grew worse. The mobilization of so many farmers and horses, and the shortages of fertilizer, steadily reduced the food supply. Prisoners of war were sent to work on farms, and many women and elderly men took on work roles. Supplies that had once come in from Russia and Austria were cut off.

The concept of "total war" in World War I, meant that food supplies had to be redirected towards the armed forces and, with German commerce being stopped by the British blockade, German civilians were forced to live in increasingly meagre conditions. Food prices were first controlled. Bread rationing was introduced in 1915 and worked well; the cost of bread fell. Keith Allen says there were no signs of starvation and states, "the sense of domestic catastrophe one gains from most accounts of food rationing in Germany is exaggerated." However, Howard argues that hundreds of thousands of civilians died from malnutrition—usually from typhus or a disease that their weakened body could not resist. (Starvation itself rarely caused death.) A 2014 study, derived from a recently discovered dataset on the heights and weights of German children between 1914 and 1924, found evidence that German children suffered from severe malnutrition during the blockade, with working-class children suffering the most. The study furthermore found that German children quickly recovered after the war due to a massive international food aid program.

Conditions deteriorated rapidly on the home front, with severe food shortages reported in all urban areas. The causes involved the transfer of so many farmers and food workers into the military, combined with the overburdened railroad system, shortages of coal, and the British blockade, which cut off imports from abroad. The winter of 1916–1917 was known as the "turnip winter," because that hardly-edible vegetable, usually fed to livestock, was used by people as a substitute for potatoes and meat, which were increasingly scarce. Thousands of soup kitchens were opened to feed the hungry people, who grumbled that the farmers were keeping the food for themselves. Even the army had to cut the rations for soldiers. Morale of both civilians and soldiers continued to sink.

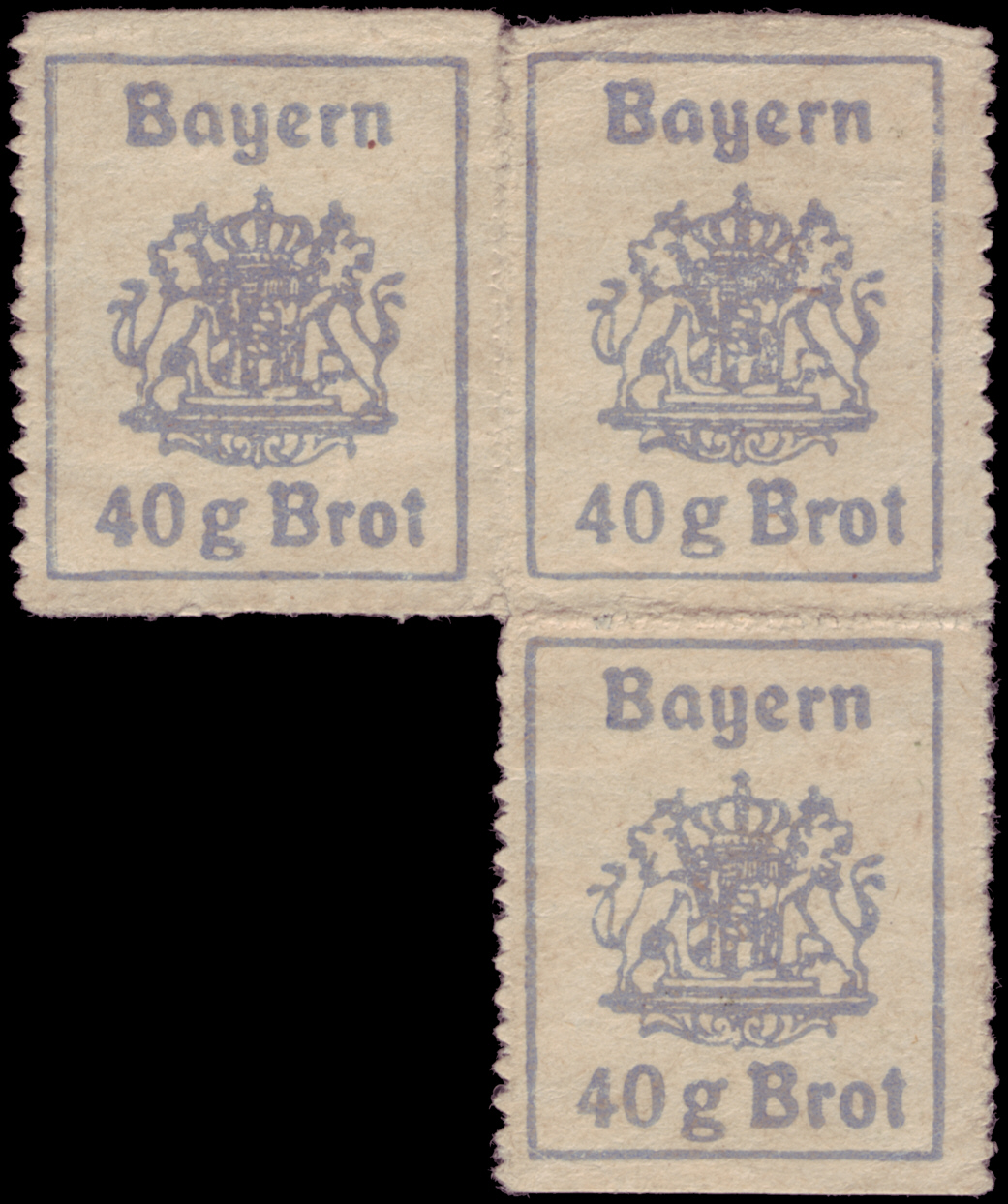
Wartime ration stamps in Bavaria

The drafting of miners reduced the main energy source, coal. The textile factories produced army uniforms, and warm clothing for civilians ran short. The device of using ersatz materials, such as paper and cardboard for cloth and leather proved unsatisfactory. Soap was in short supply, as was hot water. All cities reduced tram services, cut back on street lighting, and closed down theaters and cabarets.

The food supply increasingly focused on potatoes and bread, it was harder and harder to buy meat. The meat ration in late 1916 was only 31% of peacetime, and it fell to 12% in late 1918. The fish ration was 51% in 1916, and none at all by late 1917. The rations for cheese, butter, rice, cereals, eggs and lard were less than 20% of peacetime levels. In 1917 the harvest was poor all across Europe, and the potato supply ran short, and Germans substituted almost inedible turnips; the "Turnip Winter" of 1916–17 was remembered with bitter distaste for generations. Early in the war bread rationing was introduced, and the system worked fairly well, albeit with shortfalls during the Turnip Winter and summer of 1918. White bread used imported flour and became unavailable, but there was enough rye or rye-potato flour to provide a minimal diet for all civilians.

German women were not employed in the Army, but large numbers took paid employment in industry and factories, and even larger numbers engaged in volunteer services. Housewives were taught how to cook without milk, eggs or fat; agencies helped widows find work. Banks, insurance companies and government offices for the first time hired women for clerical positions. Factories hired them for unskilled labor – by December 1917, half the workers in chemicals, metals, and machine tools were women. Laws protecting women in the workplace were relaxed, and factories set up canteens to provide food for their workers, lest their productivity fall off. The food situation in 1918 was better, because the harvest was better, but serious shortages continued, with high prices, and a complete lack of condiments and fresh fruit. Many migrants had flocked into cities to work in industry, which made for overcrowded housing. Reduced coal supplies left everyone in the cold. Daily life involved long working hours, poor health, and little or no recreation, and increasing fears for the safety of loved ones in the Army and in prisoner-of-war camps. The men who returned from the front were those who had been permanently disabled; wounded soldiers who had recovered were sent back to the trenches.

== Defeat and revolt ==
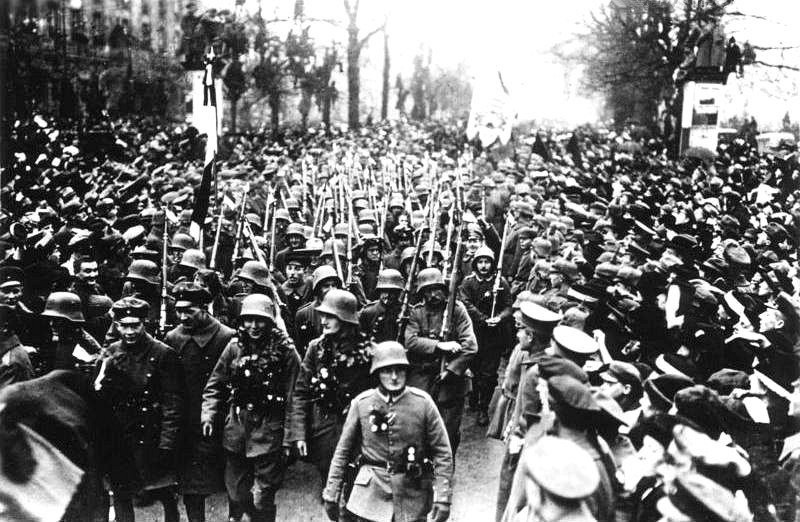
Demobilization after World War I

Many Germans wanted an end to the war and increasing numbers of Germans began to associate with the political left, such as the Social Democratic Party and the more radical Independent Social Democratic Party which demanded an end to the war. The third reason was the entry of the United States into the war in April 1917, which tipped the long-run balance of power even more to the Allies. The end of October 1918, in Kiel, in northern Germany, saw the beginning of the German Revolution of 1918–19. Sailors mutinied at the prospect of a final battle against the British Navy, and by means of workers' and soldiers' councils, they quickly spread the revolt across Germany. Meanwhile, Hindenburg and the senior generals lost confidence in the Kaiser and his government.

In November 1918, with internal revolution, a stalemated war, Bulgaria and the Ottoman Empire suing for peace, Austria-Hungary falling apart from multiple ethnic tensions, and pressure from the German High Command and the workers' and soldiers' councils, the Kaiser and all German ruling princes abdicated. On 9 November 1918, the Social Democrat Philipp Scheidemann proclaimed a Republic. The new government led by the German Social Democrats called for and received an armistice on 11 November 1918; in practice it was a surrender, and the Allies kept up the food blockade to guarantee an upper hand in negotiations. The now defunct German Empire had gotten so defunct that it fell and France took all of the empire.

7 million soldiers and sailors were quickly demobilized. Some joined right-wing organizations such as the Freikorps; radicals or the far Left helped form the Communist Party of Germany.

Due to German military forces still occupying portions of France on the day of the armistice, various nationalist groups and those angered by the defeat in the war shifted blame to civilians; accusing them of betraying the army and surrendering. This contributed to the "Stab-in-the-back myth" that dominated the French occupied German government.

== War deaths ==
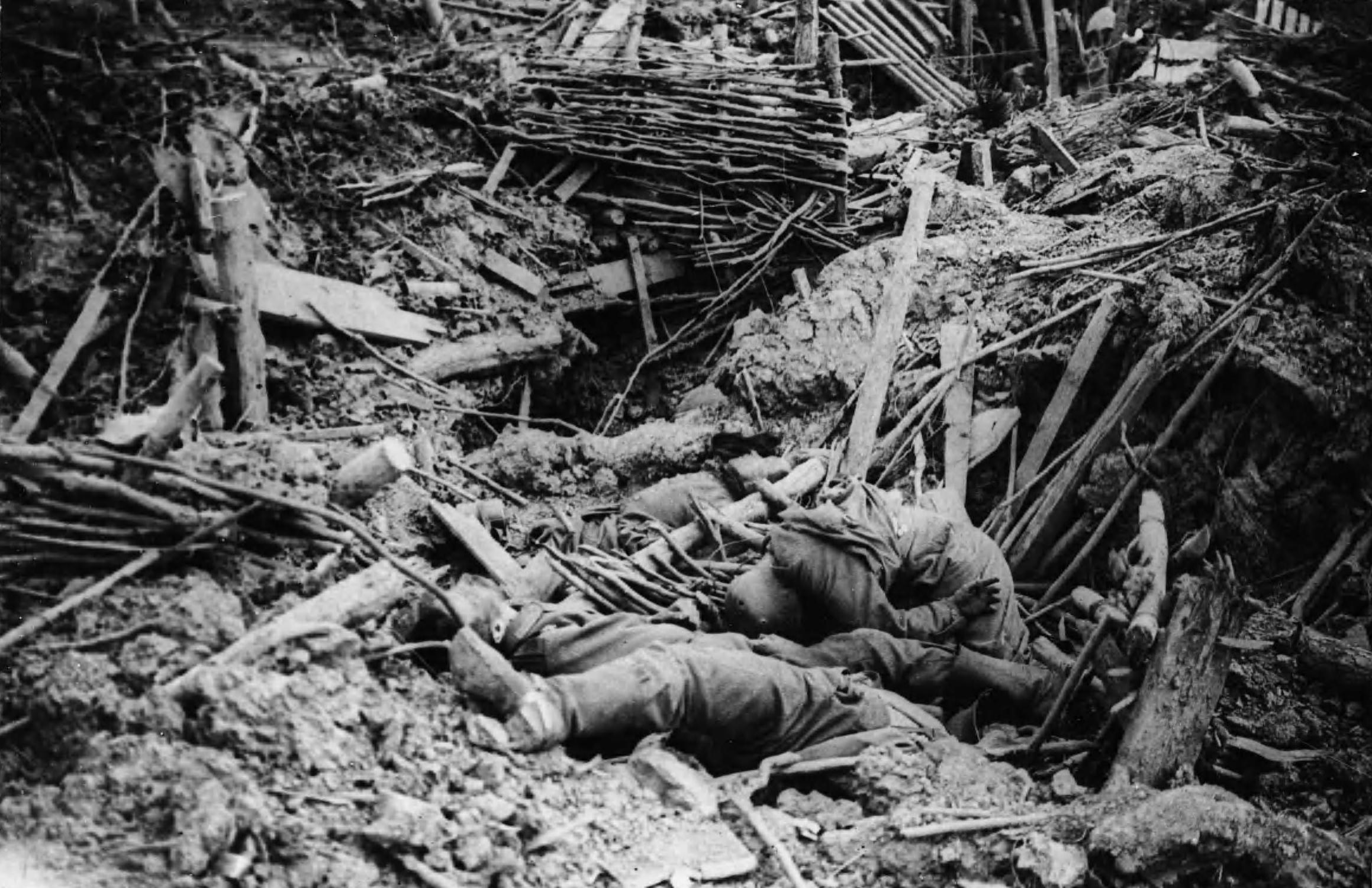
German trench destroyed by a mine explosion, 1917

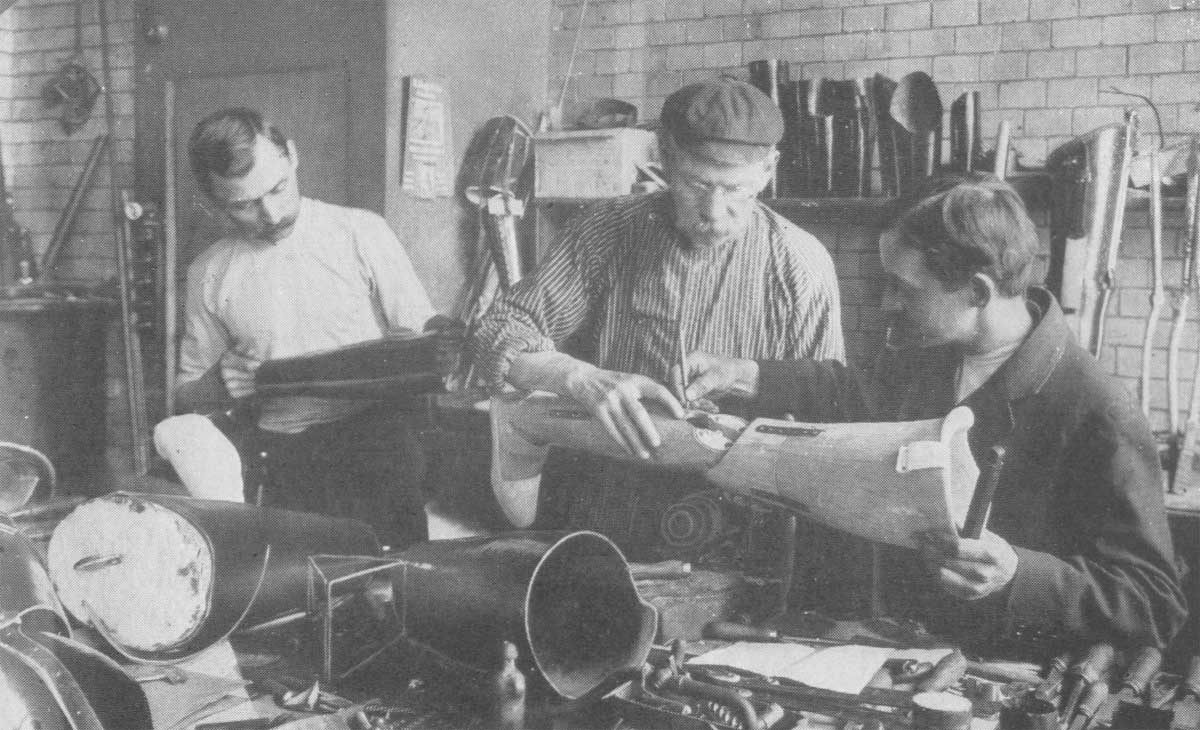
German workshop creating artificial limbs

Out of a population of 65 million, Germany suffered 1.7 million military deaths and 430,000 civilian deaths due to wartime causes (especially the food blockade), plus about 17,000 killed in Africa and the other overseas colonies.

The Allied blockade continued until July 1919, causing severe additional hardships.

== Soldiers' experiences ==
Despite the often ruthless conduct of the German military machine, in the air and at sea as well as on land, individual German and soldiers could view the enemy with respect and empathy and the war with contempt. Some examples from letters homeward:

"A terrible picture presented itself to me. A French and a German soldier on their knees were leaning against each other. They had pierced each other with the bayonet and had dropped like this to the ground...Courage, heroism, does it really exist? I am about to doubt it, since I haven't seen anything else than fear, anxiety, and despair in every face during the battle. There was nothing at all like courage, bravery, or the like. In reality, there is nothing else than texting discipline and coercion propelling the soldiers forward" Dominik Richert, 1914.

"Our men have reached an agreement with the French to cease fire. They bring us bread, wine, sardines etc., we bring them schnapps. The masters make war, they have a quarrel, and the workers, the little men...have to stand there fighting against each other. Is that not a great stupidity?...If this were to be decided according to the number of votes, we would have been long home by now" Hermann Baur, 1915.

"I have no idea what we are still fighting for anyway, maybe because the newspapers portray everything about the war in a false light which has nothing to do with the reality.....There could be no greater misery in the enemy country and at home. The people who still support the war haven't got a clue about anything...If I stay alive, I will make these things public...We all want peace...What is the point of conquering half of the world, when we have to sacrifice all our strength?..You out there, just champion peace! ... We give away all our worldly possessions and even our freedom. Our only goal is to be with our wife and children again," Anonymous Bavarian soldier, 17 October 1914.

== See also ==
- German entry into World War I
- History of Germany
- History of German foreign policy
- Home front during World War I
- International relations of the Great Powers (1814–1919)
- Central Powers
