= Jürgen Rohwer =

German military historian (1924–2015)

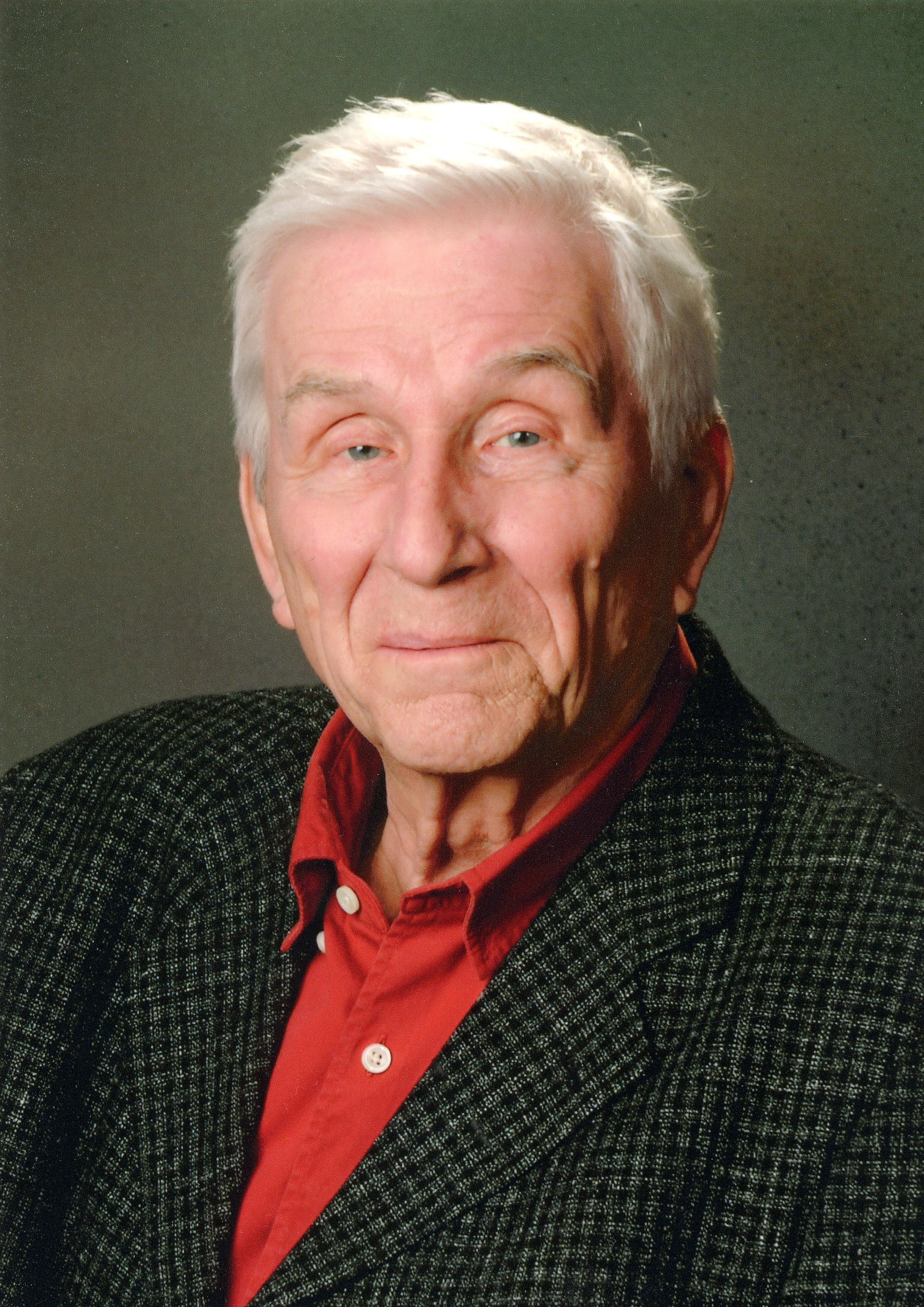
Rohwer in 2004

Jürgen Rohwer (24 May 1924 – 24 July 2015) was a German military historian and professor of history at the University of Stuttgart. Rohwer wrote more than 400 books and essays on World War II naval history and military intelligence, which gained him worldwide recognition as a prominent historian and a leading authority on U-boats.

== Biography ==
Rohwer was born in Friedrichroda. After leaving school in 1942, he entered the Kriegsmarine as an officer candidate (crew VI/42). During World War II he served on several German warships, including destroyer Z24, Sperrbrecher 104/Martha, and minesweeper M-502. After the end of the war he left service and studied history at the University of Hamburg. During that time he got into contact with Günter Hessler – son in law to Karl Dönitz – and was commissioned by the British Royal Navy to write an official account of the U-boat war 1939–1945.

In 1954 he received his doctoral degree at Hamburg University for his dissertation on German-American relations from 1937 to 1941. In 1959 he became the director of the Bibliothek für Zeitgeschichte in Stuttgart. During his tenure, the library became an internationally renowned institution for military history and especially the war at sea. In the 1970s, Rohwer researched the history of cryptanalysis in World War II and especially the decoding of Enigma by the British and Polish scientists. In a cooperation of the Bibliothek für Zeitgeschichte and the University of Stuttgart, the congress "Der Mord an den europäischen Juden" (The murder of the European Jews) took place in May 1984. Together with Eberhard Jäckel, Rohwer edited the book Der Mord an den Juden im Zweiten Weltkrieg. Entschlußbildung und Verwirklichung, which contains the most important contributions from the congress. Jürgen Rohwer retired in 1989. He died in Weinstadt.

== Publications ==
- Rohwer, Jürgen (1965). Die Versenkung der jüdischen Flüchtlingstransporter Struma und Mefkure im Schwarzen Meer (Februar 1942, August 1944): historische Untersuchung [The sinking of the Jewish refugee transporters Struma and Mefkure in the Black Sea (February 1942, August 1944): historical investigation] (in German). Frankfurt/Main: Bernard & Graefe. OCLC 910515.
- Rohwer, Jürgen (1968). Die U-Boot-Erfolge der Achsenmächte 1939–1945 [The Axis Submarine Successes 1939–1945] (in German). München: Lehmann. OCLC 464537651.
- Rohwer, Jürgen (1977). The Critical Convoy Battles of March 1943: The Battle for HX.229/SC122. Annapolis: US Naval Institute Press. ISBN 0-87021-818-2.
- Rohwer, Jürgen (1983). Axis submarine successes: 1939–1945. Annapolis: Naval Institute Press.
- Rohwer, Jürgen (1997). Allied submarine attacks of World War Two: European Theatre of Operations 1939–1945. London: Greenhill Books. ISBN 1-85367-274-2.
- Rohwer, Jürgen (2005). Chronology of the War at Sea, 1939–1945: The Naval History of World War Two. Annapolis: US Naval Institute Press. ISBN 1-59114-119-2. OCLC 936659254.
- Rohwer, Jürgen; Hümmelchen, Gerhard (1968). Chronik des Seekrieges 1939–1945 [Chronicle of the Naval War 1939–1945] (in German). Oldenburg: Stalling.
- Rohwer, Jürgen (1979). Jäckel, Eberhard (ed.). Die Funkaufklärung und ihre Rolle im Zweiten Weltkrieg [Radio reconnaissance and its role in World War II] (in German). Stuttgart: Motorbuch Verlag.
- Jäckel, Eberhard; Rohwer, Jürgen, eds. (1985). Der Mord an den Juden im Zweiten Weltkrieg: Entschlussbildung und Verwirklichung [The Murder of the Jews in World War II: Decision Making and Realization] (in German). Stuttgart: Deutsche Verlags-Anstalt. ISBN 3-421-06255-2.
- Rohwer, Jürgen; Monakov, Mikhail S. (2001). Stalin's Ocean-Going Fleet: Soviet Naval Strategy and Ship Building Programs 1935–1953. London: Cass. ISBN 0-7146-4895-7.

== Honours ==
- In November 1982, the Royal Swedish Society of Naval Sciences elected Rohwer a Corresponding Member.
