= Württembergische Landesbibliothek =

Library in Stuttgart, Germany

State Library of Württemberg
- Württembergische Landesbibliothek
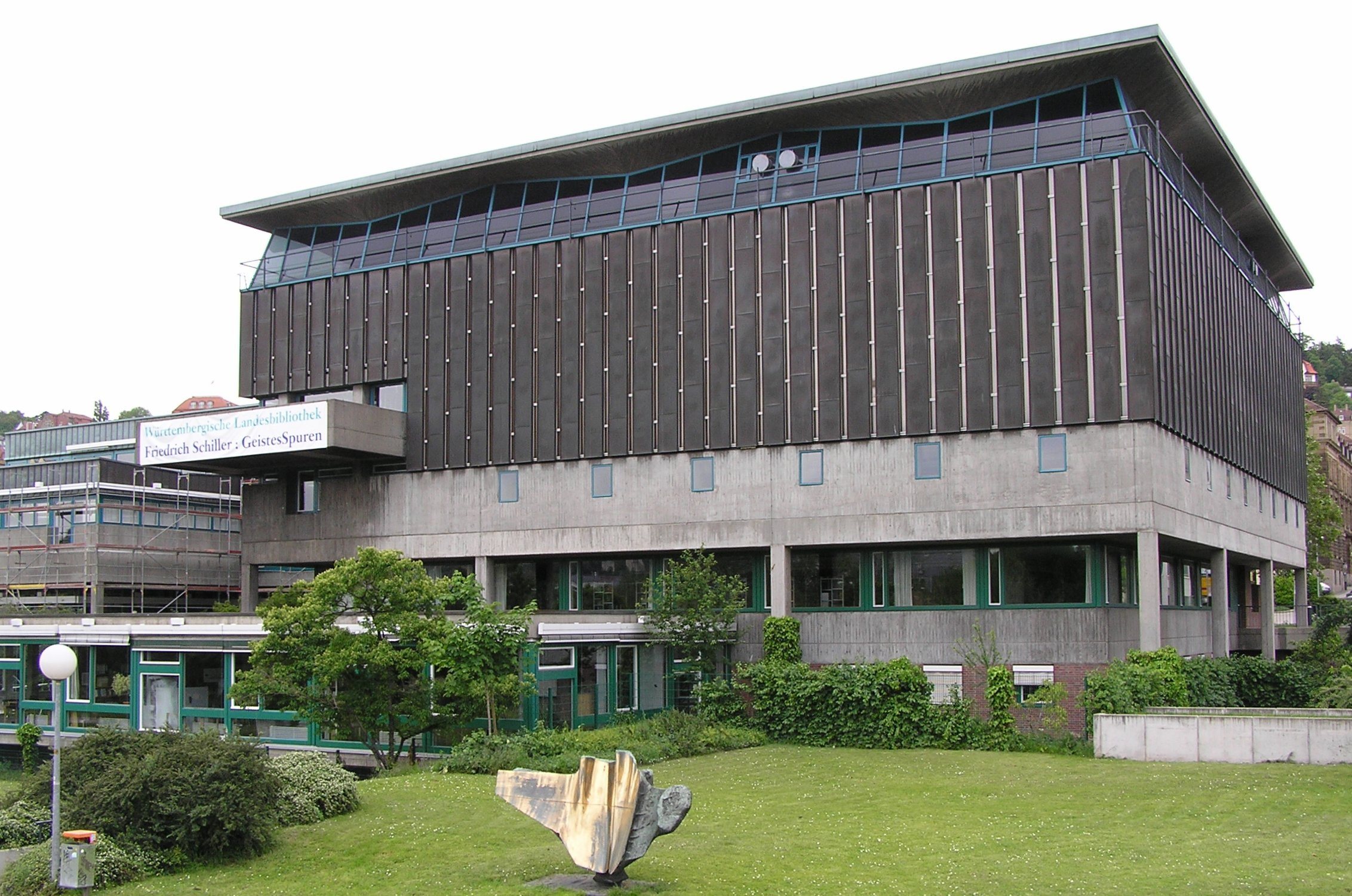
- Württembergische Landesbibliothek, Stuttgart
- 48°46′38″N 9°11′06″E
- Location: Germany
- Type: Academic library, regional library
- Established: 1765

Collection
- Size: 6,235,048 item (2022)

Other information
- Director: Rupert Schaab
- Employees: 129 (2020)
- Website: www.wlb-stuttgart.de/en

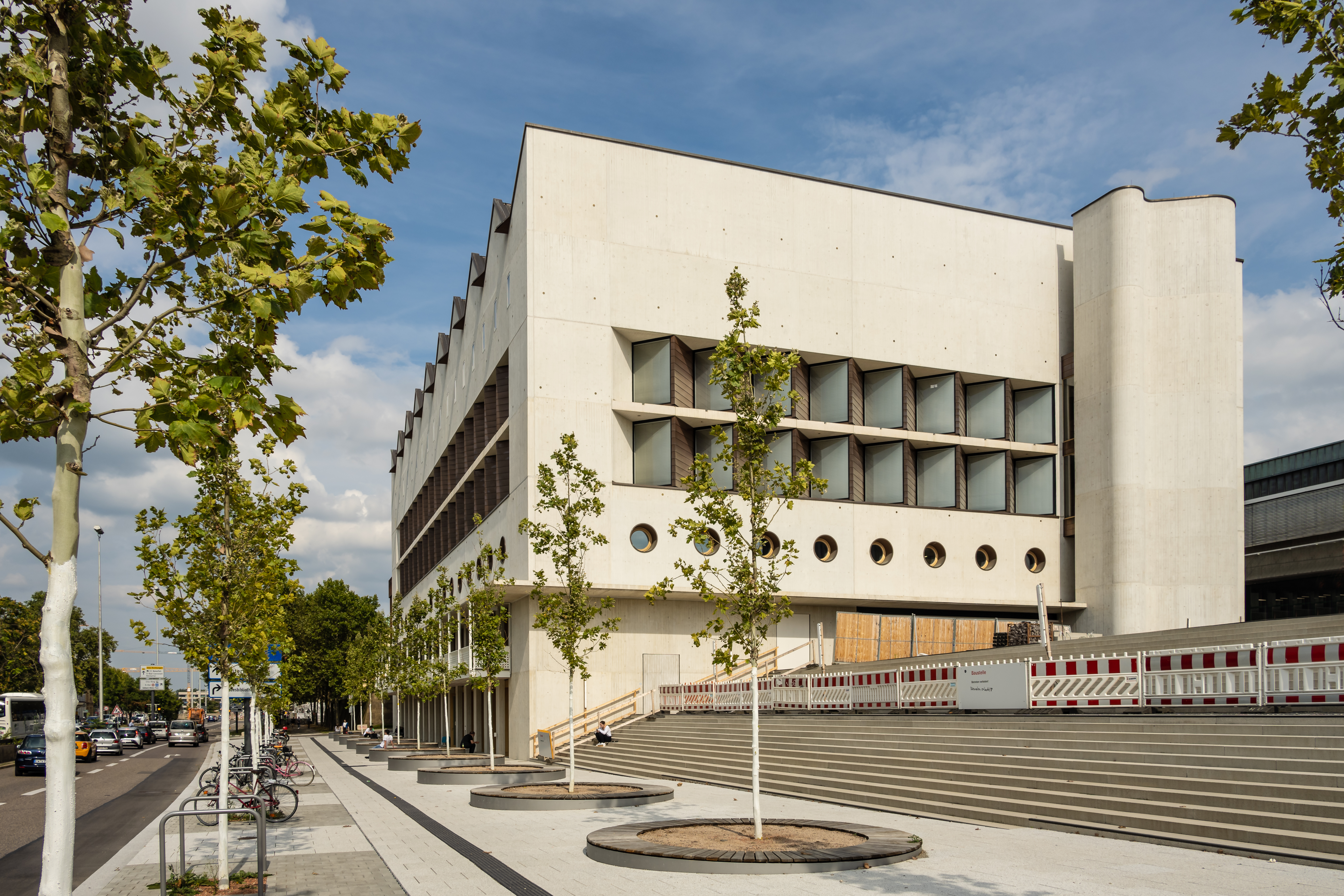
Extension building

The State Library of Württemberg (German: Württembergische Landesbibliothek or WLB) is a large library in Stuttgart, Germany, which traces its history back to the ducal public library of Württemberg founded in 1765. It holds about 4 million volumes and is the fourth-largest library in the state of Baden-Württemberg (after the university libraries of Freiburg, Heidelberg and Tübingen). The WLB owns an important collection of medieval manuscripts, as well as one of the largest Bible collections in the world.

The WLB is one of two state libraries of Baden-Württemberg, the other being the Badische Landesbibliothek (BLB) at Karlsruhe. One of the library's main purposes is to archive written literature from and about the Regierungsbezirk (state subdivision) Tübingen and Regierungsbezirk Stuttgart (i.e. roughly the former land of Württemberg). The library is entitled to a legal deposit of every work published in Baden-Württemberg before 1964.

The WLB has also been part of the Stuttgart University library system since 1967. As an academic library, it is responsible for the humanities sections of the University of Stuttgart, as well as for the Stuttgart College of Music and the Stuttgart Academy of Arts.

== History ==
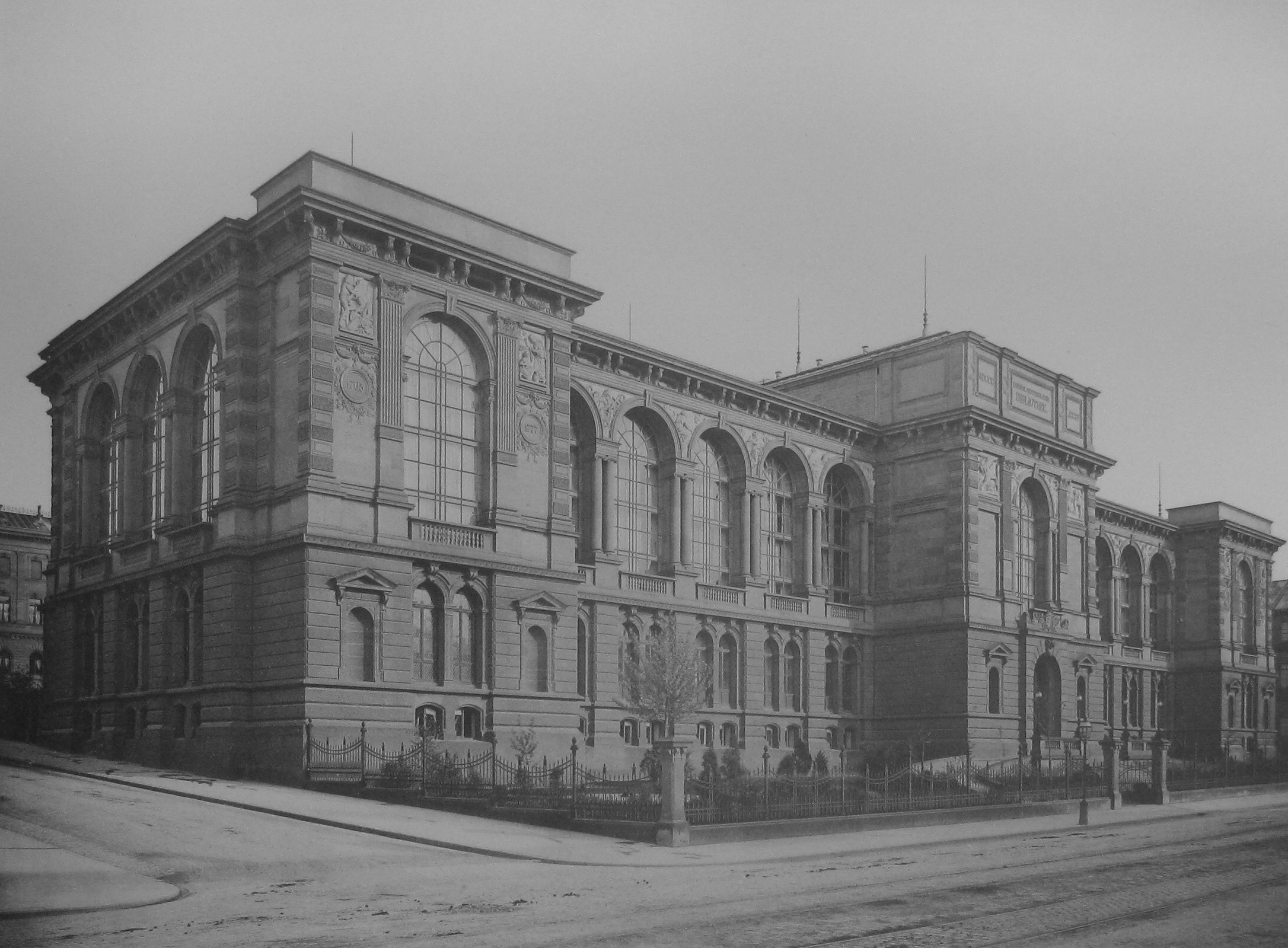
Former building of the Königliche Landesbibliothek, damaged during WW2 and later demolished

The library was founded by Karl Eugen, Duke of Württemberg as a public ducal library (Herzogliche Öffentliche Bibliothek) in Ludwigsburg, then state capital of Württemberg, on the occasion of his 37th birthday on 11 February 1765. The library was relocated to the Stuttgart Herrenhaus in 1777. Karl Eugen acted as the library director until his death, trying to establish one of Germany's leading libraries. To achieve this goal, he merged existing ducal collections with a collection he bought from his first librarian, Joseph Uriot, creating a collection of well over 10,000 volumes. The ducal collections of antiquities and coins were also added to the library collection. Karl Eugen also bought important collections for his library (including the bible collections of preacher Josias Lorck, Copenhagen, and of archdeacon Georg Wolfgang Panzer, Nuremberg). With the right of legal deposit of new books transferred from the government library Bibliothek des Regierungsrats to the new public library and the incorporation of many state-run administration libraries from all over the country, the collections grew quickly. At Karl Eugen's death, the library held 100,000 volumes.

While his successors were not as interested in books as he had been, the library still grew continuously, e.g., by incorporating books from monasteries secularized in 1803. Most of the monasterial collections, however, were given to the Royal Library (Königliche Handbibliothek), founded by King Frederick I in 1810. This old-type court library (since 1886: Königliche Hofbibliothek) was only incorporated to the collections of the public library much later.

In 1820, the library moved to the Invalidenhaus, a former military housing complex in Stuttgart. At nearly the same location, a new building was erected from 1878 to 1886. At this time, the library was renamed Königliche Landesbibliothek (Royal State Library). After the end of the monarchy, the institution was again renamed and gained its current name Württembergische Landesbibliothek.

The library was nearly completely destroyed in World War II. The most valuable items had already been stored at a safe place outside Stuttgart, but approximately half of the collection (over 400,000 volumes) was lost in the fire that followed an air raid on 12–13 December 1944. The losses included all literature after 1930, many complete thematic sections, many newspapers and magazines and most of the former Court Library. Of the buildings, only an administrative building (containing the catalogs) survived.

After the war, the library tried to fill the gaps in its collection. Regional publishing houses tried to help achieve this goal by donating large numbers of books to WLB. Horst Linde designed a new library building that opened at the former location on 3 August 1970.

== Special collections ==
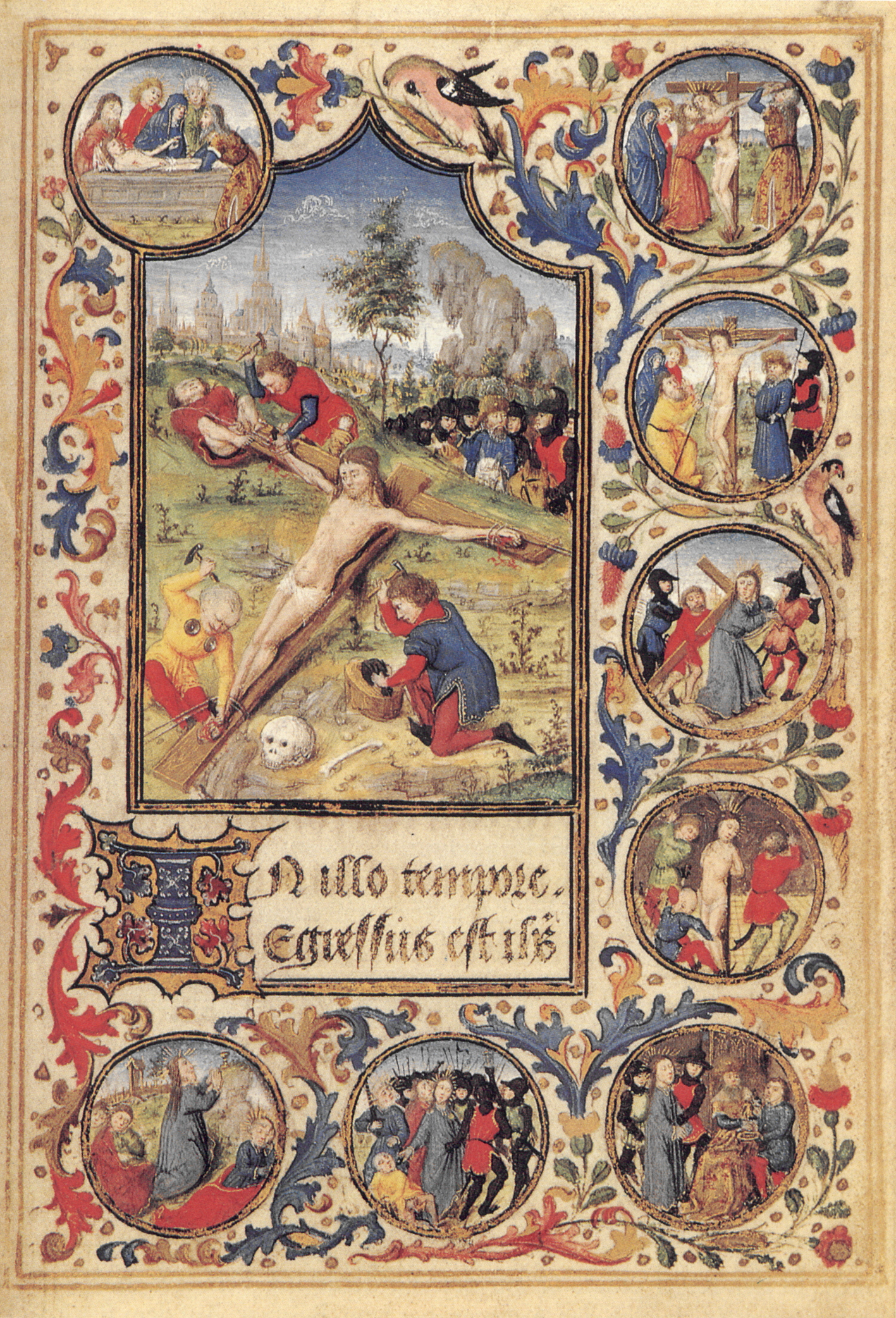
A page from the 15th-century Sachsenheimgebetbuch, Cod. brev. 162 (bought in 1960)

- Manuscripts Collection, holding over 15,000 manuscripts. The last major acquisition were 700 manuscripts from the collections of the princely library of Donaueschingen, funded by the state of Baden-Württemberg. This transaction included the manuscripts of the Zimmern Chronicle and other pre-eminent works of Baden-Württemberg history.
- Old and Rare Prints, with over 7,000 incunabula, a small collection of rare book covers, rare books from the 16th to 19th centuries, and remnants from the former Württemberg court library. The incunabula collection is one of the largest in the world.
- Library of Contemporary History, with c. 350,000 volumes from 1914 until today
- Bible Collection, with more than 20,000 printed Bibles, including a Gutenberg Bible (bought in 1978) and the only complete copy (one of three surviving) of William Tyndale's English Bible. The WLB bible collection is considered by many to be one of the most important in the world, only second to the British Library's collection.
- Music Collection, including many manuscripts and musical estates
- Map and Prints, holding c. 136,000 maps, c. 120,000 portraits, mainly of regional personalities, and c. 31,500 postcards
- Dance and Ballet Collection, c. 2,700 volumes on the history of dance and ballet
- Hölderlin Archive, including manuscripts and first editions of Friedrich Hölderlin's works; editor of the International Hölderlin Bibliography
- Stefan George Archive, including Stefan George's literary estate and editions of his work
- Former Library of the State Crafts and Trade Office (Landesgewerbeamt)

== Inventory ==
As of 2019, the library held approximately 6.1 million media, including:

- over 4 million books
- 15,555 manuscripts
- 7,093 incunabula
- 180,606 autographs
- 485,325 microfiches and microfilms
- 156,904 maps and atlases
- 160,945 pamphlets
- 584,205 photographs
- 147,748 military mail letters
- 73,861 volumes of sheet music
- 48,388 sound recordings and image carrier (av-materials)
- several electronic databases
