= Gerhard Hirschfeld =

German historian and author

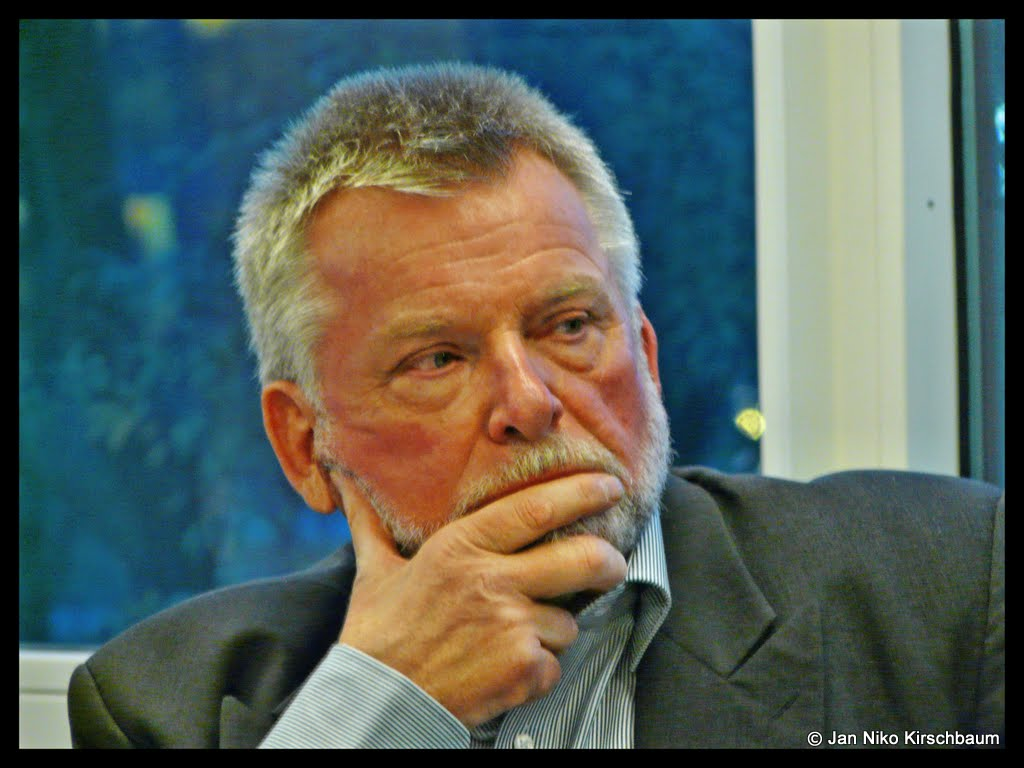
- Gerhard Hirschfeld
- Born: September 19, 1946; Plettenberg, Germany
- Education: Ruhr University Bochum; University of Cologne (M.A.); Heinrich Heine Universität Düsseldorf (PhD)
- Scientific career
- Fields: Modern History; History of Germany; World War I World War II; Social History
- Workplaces: University College Dublin; German Historical Institute London; Bibliothek für Zeitgeschichte; University of Stuttgart
- Thesis: Fremdherrschaft und Kollaboration. Die Niederlande unter deutscher Besatzung (1981)
- Doctoral advisor: Wolfgang Mommsen
- Doctoral students: Christian Ingrao
- Website: University of Stuttgart Faculty of History page

Gerhard Hirschfeld (born 19 September 1946 in Plettenberg, Germany) is a German historian and author. From 1989 to 2011, he was director of the Stuttgart-based Bibliothek für Zeitgeschichte / Library of Contemporary History, and has been a professor at the Institute of History of the University of Stuttgart since 1997. In 2016 he also became a visiting professor at the Institute for International Studies, University of Wuhan (China).

== Education and career ==
Hirschfeld studied History, German literature (Germanistik) and political science (Staatsexamen 1974) at the Ruhr University Bochum and the University of Cologne. He was a lecturer at University College Dublin from 1974 to 1975. Hirschfeld received his Ph.D. from Heinrich Heine University Düsseldorf, 1981. He was assistant to Professor Wolfgang Mommsen at Düsseldorf University, 1977–1978. From 1978-1989, Hirschfeld was a Fellow with the German Historical Institute London.

Hirschfeld was director of the Library of Contemporary History (Bibliothek fuer Zeitgeschichte) in Stuttgart from 1989-2011, and professor at the Institute of History, University of Stuttgart (since 1997). In 2016, he was appointed visiting professor at the Institute for International Studies, University of Wuhan in China. From 1990 to 2000, he was chairman of the German Committee for History of the Second World War, and president of the International Committee for the Study of the Second World War from 2000 to 2010.

His historical fields of interest (research, teaching and writing) include the History of the First and the Second World War, 20th Century History of the Netherlands, and the History of Emigration from Nazi-Germany after 1933.

Hirschfeld has written and edited more than 50 books and 100 articles and has lectured at numerous universities and conferences in Europe, USA, Canada, Israel, Australia, Japan and China.

== Fellowships and memberships ==
Hirschfeld was a Guest Lecturer at the Universities of Warwick and Birmingham and Research Fellow at Queen Elizabeth House, Oxford University between 1982 and 1989. In 1996–1997 and 2006–2007 Hirschfeld was a Fellow of the Institute of Advanced Studies in the Netherlands. From 2000 to 2015, he was a Member of the Royal Netherlands Academy of Arts and Sciences /Science Committee of the Netherlands Institute of War, Holocaust and Genocide Studies, Amsterdam. Hirschfeld is or was member of numerous academic committees and advisory councils, inter alia the Centre de Recherche des Historial de la Grande Guerre, Péronne, the Comité Scientique du Mémorial de Verdun, memorial for the victims of the NS-euthanasia in Baden-Württemberg, Grafeneck, the Fritz Bauer Institute, Deutsches Historisches Museum in Berlin, the Landschaftsverband Rheinland: Forum Vogelsang and 1914: Mitten in Europa, the Centre for Second World War Studies, University of Birmingham; further he is or was member of several editorial advisory boards, including the International Encyclopedia of the First World War 1914-1918-Online and the journals Zeithistorische Forschungen and Tijdschrift voor Geschiedenis.

== Publications (selection) ==
On the First World War:

- (Jointly edited with Gerd Krumeich and Irina Renz) Enzyklopädie Erster Weltkrieg (Encyclopedia of the First World War) (German: Schöningh/UTB: 2004, revised and extended edition 2014, English edn Brill: 2012)
- Scorched Earth. The Germans on the Somme, 1914–1918 (German edn: Die Deutschen an der Somme 1914-1918: Krieg, Besatzung, Verbrannte Erde, Klartext 2006, rev. edn 2016; Dutch edn: 2008), Barnsley 2009 ISBN 9781844159734
- Deutschland im Ersten Weltkrieg, (S. Fischer: 2013).
- "Germany," in: Blackwell Companions to World History, ed. by John Horne (Blackwell-Wiley: 2010), pp. 432–446.
- (Jointly edited with Gerd Krumeich and Irina Renz): Die Deutschen an der Somme 1914–1918. Krieg, Besatzung, Verbrannte Erde (Klartext, Essen 2016) ISBN 978-3-8375-1459-9
- (Together with Gerd Krumeich and Irina Renz) 1918: Die Deutschen zwischen Weltkrieg und Revolution (Chr. Links Verlag: Berlin 2018).
- Sarajevo. 28. Juni 1914. Die Geschichte hinter dem Bild (Landeszentrale für politische Bildung Thüringen: Erfurt 2020).

On the Second World War:

- Nazi Rule and Dutch Collaboration. The Netherlands under German Occupation, 1940–1945 (Berg Publishers / Berghahn Books: 1988, German edn: 1984, Dutch edn: 1991).
- (jointly edited with Lothar Kettenacker: The "Führer State": Myth and Reality. Studies on the Structure and Politics of the Third Reich (Klett-Cotta: 1981).
- Exile in Great Britain. Refugees from Hitler's Germany (Berg Publishers: 1984).
- The Policies of Genocide. Jews and Soviet Prisoners of War in Nazi Germany (Allen & Unwin: 1986).
- Collaboration in France. Politics and Culture during the Nazi Occupation, 1940–1944 (Berg Publishers: 1989).
- (Jointly edited with Dittmar Dahlmann): Vergangenes Russland. Bilder aus dem Zarenreich, Klartext Verlag, Essen 1995, ISBN 3-88474-271-X
- (Jointly edited with Gustavo Corni) L'umanità offesa. Stermini e memoria nell'Europa del Novecento, (Il Mulino: 2003).
- La guerra contro gli slavi, in: Storia della Shoah. La crisi dell'Europa lo sterminio degli ebrei e la memoria del xx secolo, vol. 1: La crisi dell' Europa e lo stermino degli ebrei, a cura di Marina Cattaruzza et al., Turin (UTET: 2005, pp. 787–809).
- (Jointly edited with Tobias Jersak) Karrieren im Nationalsozialismus. Funktionseliten zwischen Mitwirkung und Distanz (Campus: 2004). ISBN 3-593-37156-1.
- (Together with Irina Renz) “Vormittags die ersten Amerikaner”. Stimmen und Bilder vom Kriegsende 1945 (Klett-Cotta: 2005).

Other:

- (Together with Wolfgang Mommsen) Sozialprotest, Gewalt, Terror: Gewaltanwendung durch politische und gesellschaftliche Randgruppen im 19. und 20. Jahrhundert, 1982.
- Kriegsverbrechen in der niederländischen Kolonialzeit: Indonesien 1945–1949, in Wolfram Wette, Gerd R Ueberschär (eds.)Kriegsverbrechen im 20. Jahrhundert (Primus: 2001).
- Mata Hari: die größte Spionin des 20. Jahrhunderts?, in: Wolfgang Krieger (ed.) Geheimdienste in der Weltgeschichte, München: C.H. Beck 2003, pp. 151-169. ISBN 9783406502484.
