= Wolfgang Mommsen =

German historian (1930–2004)

Wolfgang Justin Mommsen
- Born: 5 November 1930; Marburg, Germany
- Died: 11 August 2004 (aged 73); Bansin, Germany
- Education: University of Marburg; University of Cologne (PhD)
- Scientific career
- Fields: Modern History; German Empire; United Kingdom of Great Britain and Ireland; Imperialism; World War I Max Weber
- Workplaces: University of Leeds, University of Cologne, University of Düsseldorf, German Historical Institute London
- Thesis: Max Weber und die deutsche Politik 1890–1920 (1958)
- Doctoral advisor: Theodor Schieder

Wolfgang Justin Mommsen (German pronunciation: [vɔlfgaŋ jʊʃtiːn mɔmzn̩]; 5 November 1930 – 11 August 2004) was a German historian. He was the twin brother of historian Hans Mommsen and the great-grandson of Theodor Mommsen.

== Biography ==
Wolfgang Mommsen was born in Marburg, the son of the historian Wilhelm Mommsen and great-grandson of the Roman historian Theodor Mommsen. He was educated at the University of Marburg, the University of Cologne, and the University of Leeds between 1951 and 1959. He was assistant professor at the University of Cologne (1959–1967) and full professor at the University of Düsseldorf (1967–1996); he directed the German Historical Institute in London between 1978 and 1985. In the Spring of 1989, Mommsen was a Fellow at the Swedish Collegium for Advanced Study in Uppsala, Sweden. In 1965, he married Sabine von Schalburg, with whom he had four children. Mommsen was PhD supervisor to several notable historians, inter alia Walter H. Pehle, Dirk Blasius, Gerhard Hirschfeld, Gangolf Hübinger, Stig Förster, Holger Afflerbach, Peter Theiner and Boris Barth.

Mommsen wrote a biography of Max Weber in 1958. His dissertation, on Weber and German politics, published in English in 1984, revolutionized the "understanding of the 20th century's most influential sociologist by setting him firmly in the context of his times, and showing him to be a liberal nationalist and imperialist, much to the horror of many of his admirers. He went on to demonstrate that a knowledge of Weber's political thought and action was essential if one were to grasp accurately his theory of power. This was an outstanding achievement, and Wolfgang followed it up by playing a leading role in editing a new, comprehensive edition of Weber's works. The Mommsens were related to Weber by marriage, so there was something particularly iconoclastic in Wolfgang's book, which caused a huge storm when it first appeared." His main area of expertise was 19th- and 20th-century British and German history. His interests were wide-ranging: he wrote about diplomatic, social, intellectual, and economic history. Mommsen championed a Sonderweg ("special path") interpretation of German history. Echoing the views of Hans-Ulrich Wehler and Fritz Fischer, he argued that 19th-century Germany was only partially modernized, as economic modernization was not accompanied by political modernization. Much of Mommsen's comparative studies of British and German history concern the question of why, in his view, the British experienced both political and economic modernization, while the Germans had only the latter. An Anglophile, Mommsen greatly enjoyed teaching and living in the United Kingdom.

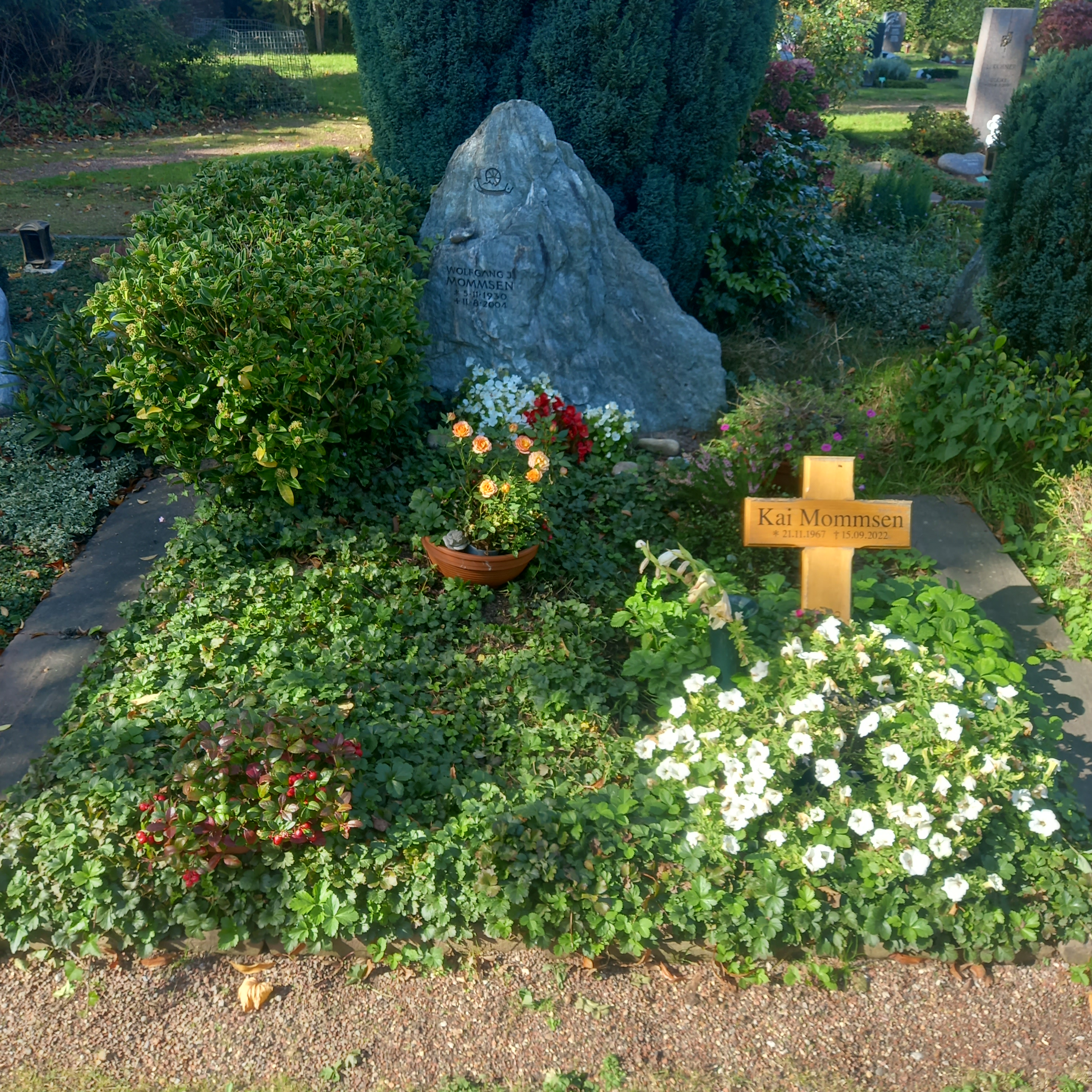
Wolfgang Mommsen's grave

In Mommsen's view, the foreign policy of the German Empire was driven by domestic concerns, as the German elite sought distractions abroad to hold off demands for democracy at home. For Mommsen, the major responsibility for the outbreak of the First World War rested on Germany's shoulders. Furthermore, the November Revolution of 1918 did not go far enough and allowed the pre-1918 elite to continue to dominate German life, thus leading inevitably to Nazi Germany. Mommsen wrote various books condemning appeasement.

In the Historikerstreit ("historians' dispute"), Mommsen took the position that the Holocaust was a uniquely evil event and should not be compared to the Stalinist Terror in the Soviet Union.

Mommsen served as an editor for the Max Weber-Gesamtausgabe project, which was a republication of all of Max Weber's writings. The project concluded in 2020 and contains forty-five volumes.

He drowned in a swimming accident in the Baltic Sea on 11 August 2004.

== Work ==
- Max Weber und die deutsche Politik, 1890–1920, 1959.
- "The Debate on German War Aims" pages 47–74 from Journal of Contemporary History, Volume 1, 1966.
- "Die latente Krise des Deutschen Reiches, 1909–1914" from Handbuch der deutschen Geschichte, Volume 4: Deutsche Geschichte der neuesten Zeit von Bismarcks Entlassung bis zur Gegenwart, 1973.
- The Age of Bureaucracy: Perspectives on the Political Sociology of Max Weber, 1974.
- "Society and War: Two New Analyses of the First World War," Journal of Modern History Vol. 47, No. 3, September 1975,
- Imperialismustheorien, 1977.
- Der europäische Imperialismus. Aufsätze und Abhandlungen, 1979.
- The Emergence of the Welfare State in Britain and Germany, 1850–1950, co-edited with Wolfgang Mock, 1981.
- Sozialprotest, Gewalt, Terror: Gewaltanwendung durch politische und gesellschaftliche Randgruppen im 19. und 20. Jahrhundert, co-edited with Gerhard Hirschfeld, 1982.
- The Fascist Challenge and the Policy of Appeasement, co-edited with Lothar Kettenacker, 1983.
- The Development of Trade Unionism in Great Britain and Germany, 1880–1914, co-edited with Hans-Gerhard Husung, 1985.
- Imperialism and After: Continuities and Discontinuities co-edited with Jürgen Osterhammel, 1986.
- Bismarck, Europe, and Africa: The Berlin Africa Conference, 1884–1885, and the Onset of Partition, co-edited with Stig Förster and Ronald Robinson, 1988.
- The Political and Social Theory of Max Weber: Collected Essays, 1989.
- "Neither Denial nor Forgetfulness Will Free Us From the Past: Harmonizing Our Understanding of History Endangers Freedom" pages 202–215 from Forever In The Shadow Of Hitler? edited by Ernst Piper, Atlantic Highlands, N.J.: Humanities Press, 1993.
- Intellektuelle im Deutschen Kaiserreich, co-edited with Gangolf Hubinger, 1993.
- Großmachtstellung und Weltpolitik 1870–1914. Die Außenpolitik des Deutschen Reiches, Propyläen Studienausgabe, Berlin, 1993.
- Der Autoritäre Nationalstaat, 1990 translated by Richard Deveson into English as Imperial Germany 1867–1918: Politics, culture, and society in an authoritarian state, 1995.
- "Max Weber and the Regeneration of Russia," Journal of Modern History Vol. 69, No. 1, March 1997.

== Sources ==
- Evans, Richard J. (16 August 2004). "Wolfgang Mommsen: A Leading German Historian, He Brought Academics Together to Further the Understanding of His Country's Past". The Guardian. Archived from the original on 19 March 2023.
- Hanke, Edith; Hübinger, Gangolf; Schwentker, Wolfgang (January 2012). "The Genesis of the Max Weber-Gesamtausgabe and the Contribution of Wolfgang J. Mommsen". Max Weber Studies. 12 (1): 59–94. doi:10.1353/max.2012.a808787. ISSN 1470-8078. JSTOR 24579988. S2CID 171047848. Project MUSE 808787.
- Hübinger, Gangolf (January 2005). "Obituary: Professor Dr DLitt (h.c.) Wolfgang J. Mommsen 5 November, 1930–11 August, 2004". Max Weber Studies. 5 (1): 113–117. doi:10.1353/max.2005.a808923. ISSN 1470-8078. S2CID 163386728. Project MUSE 808923.
- Ishida, Takeshi; Orihara, Hiroshi; Sasabe, Yukitaka; Sumiya, Kazuhiko; Tominaga, Ken'ichi; Uchida, Yoshiaki; Ueyama, Yasutoshi; Yano, Yoshiro; Yoshime, Katsuhiko (January 2005). "In Memory of Professor Wolfgang J. Mommsen". Max Weber Studies. 5 (1): 123–124. doi:10.1353/max.2005.a808966. ISSN 1470-8078. JSTOR 24580004. Project MUSE 808966.
- Lichtblau, Klaus (January 2022). "On the Conclusion of the Max Weber Gesamtausgabe: A Meta-Critical Review". Max Weber Studies. 22 (1). Translated by Whimster, Sam: 74–124. doi:10.1353/max.2022.0004. ISSN 1470-8078. S2CID 252017012. Project MUSE 862056.
- Mommsen, Wolfgang J. (1993). "Neither Denial nor Forgetfulness Will Free Us from the Past: Harmonizing Our Understanding of History Endangers Freedom". Forever in the Shadow of Hitler?: Original Documents of the Historikerstreit, the Controversy Concerning the Singularity of the Holocaust. Translated by Knowlton, James; Cates, Truett. Atlantic Highlands, New Jersey: Humanities Press. pp. 202–215. ISBN 9780391038110. OCLC 623213918.
- Whimster, Sam (January 2005). "Wolfgang J. Mommsen: A British Appreciation". Max Weber Studies. 5 (1): 119–122. doi:10.1353/max.2005.a808967. ISSN 1470-8078. JSTOR 24580003. Project MUSE 808967.
