= Dominik Richert =

German World War I veteran and writer (1893–1977)

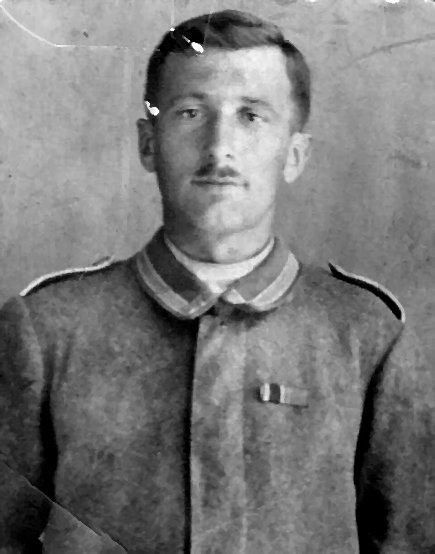
Dominik Richert

Dominik Richert (1893 in St. Ulrich, Alsace – 1977 in St. Ulrich) was a German soldier in World War I who deserted to the French in 1918. Richert became widely known posthumously after the publication of his memoirs of World War I in 1987.

== Biography ==
Born to a German in St. Ulrich (then part of Germany), Richert was a front-line soldier for the Imperial German Army at the start of World War I, During his army service, he was decorated twice.

After fighting French Army troops in 1914 and Indian Army troops in 1915, Richert was sent behind the front for recuperation. Because of telling some new recruits that an order to take no prisoners had been given, he was admonished and threatened with transfer to the Eastern Front against Russia.

As the risk of their desertion was greater, soldiers from Alsace were not transferred back to the Western Front till 1918. There Richert was involved in an attack on British forces before being transferred to a section of the Front opposite French forces. In early 1918, with two other soldiers, he crossed over no-man's-land to become a “deserteur Alsacien”. The account ends with Richert's return home to Alsace (now under French control) early in 1919.

In 1940, in World War II, Alsace fell to the Germany Army. Soon after, the army called Richert's two sons for military service. In response, he encouraged them to escape to Switzerland. As a result of his actions, Richert and his wife were sent to perform forced labour in Germany. His sons later joined the French Resistance. Richert and his wife returned to Alsace at the end of the war, both in ill health from their time in Germany. His sons both survived the war.

== Memoirs ==
Richert's memoirs of World War I were discovered in a German military archive by Bernd Ulrich in 1987. He and his colleague Angelika Tramitz were able to contact Richert's family. By researching military archives, they verified the authenticity of the text. The memoirs were first published in German in 1989. They were late published in French and English. They have also been the subject of academic study. The book was also used as the basis for a television documentary.

The memoirs show that Richert's attitude to the War was clear from the outset:

... I thought straight away that the most likely thing that can happen to you in a war is that you will be shot dead. That was a really unpleasant prospect. In addition, I was worried about my relatives and my home, because they were near the border and therefore at risk of being destroyed.

While in Northern France in 1914 Richert was ordered to run across an exposed position:

Now it was my turn. As it would have been certain death, I refused to go, although my superior shouted at me. An NCO gave me a direct command to jump. I cold-bloodedly said to him that he should show me how to do it, but he also lacked the courage to do so.

Richert had little respect for military values:

Bravery, Heroism – does it exist? I doubt it very much, because all that I saw when under fire was fright, fear and desperation written in every face. But I did not see courage or bravery at all, because in reality it’s only the fearful military discipline, the force, that drives the soldier forwards to his death.

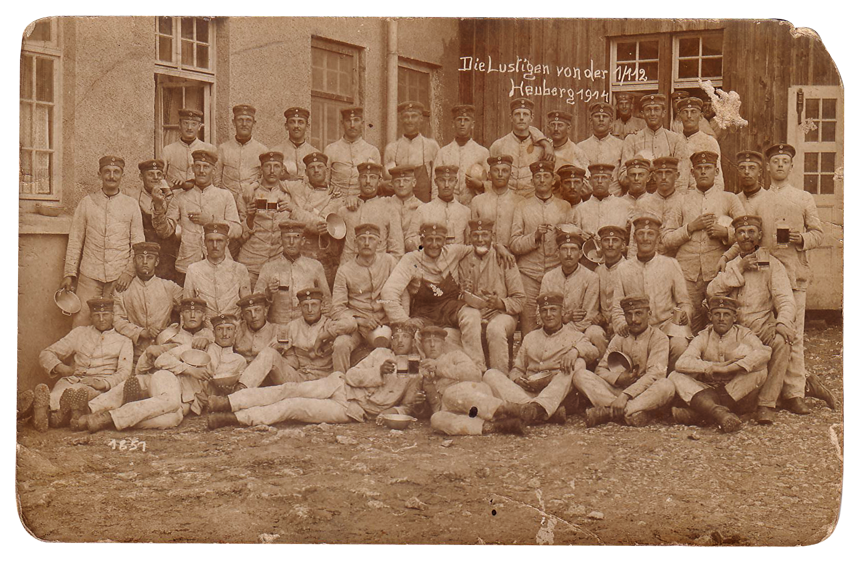
Juli 1914

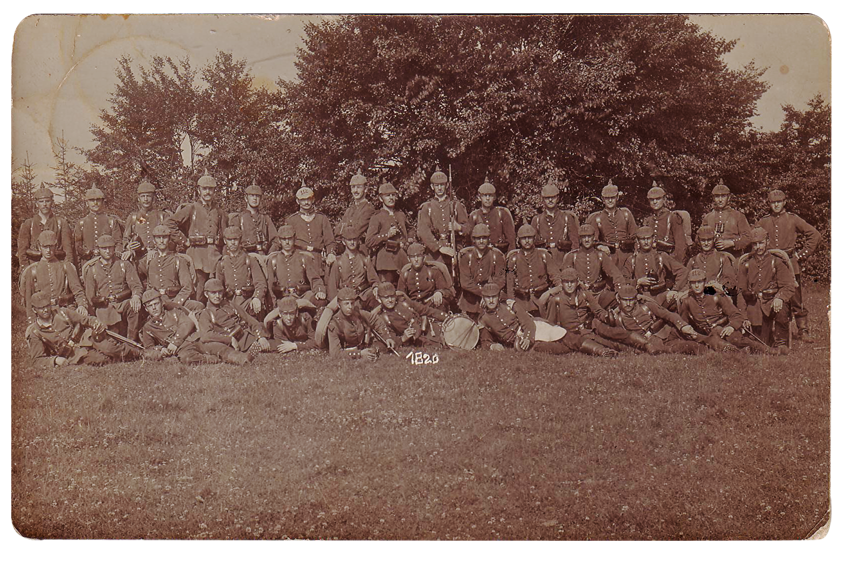

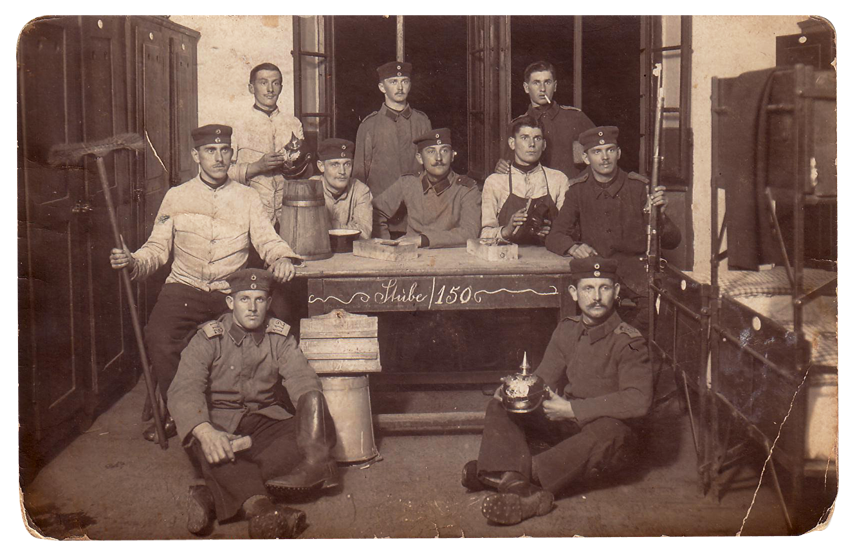

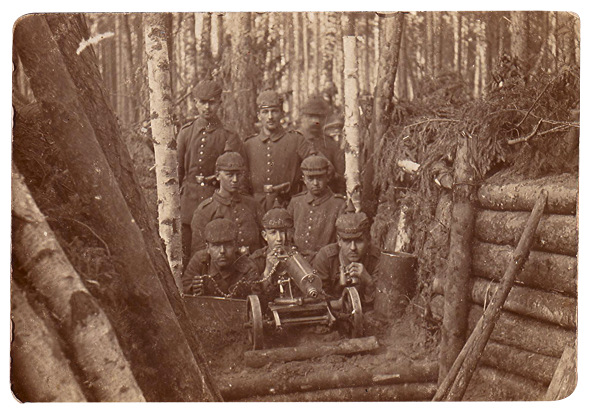

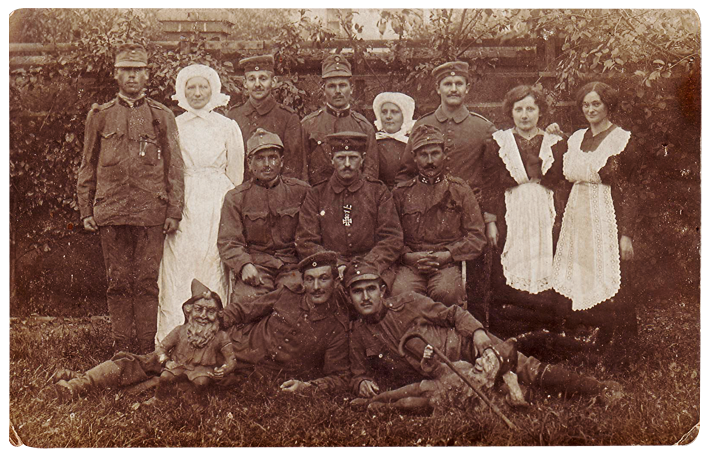
