= Library of Contemporary History =

One of Europe's largest contemporary history libraries, in Stuttgart

- Bibliothek für Zeitgeschichte
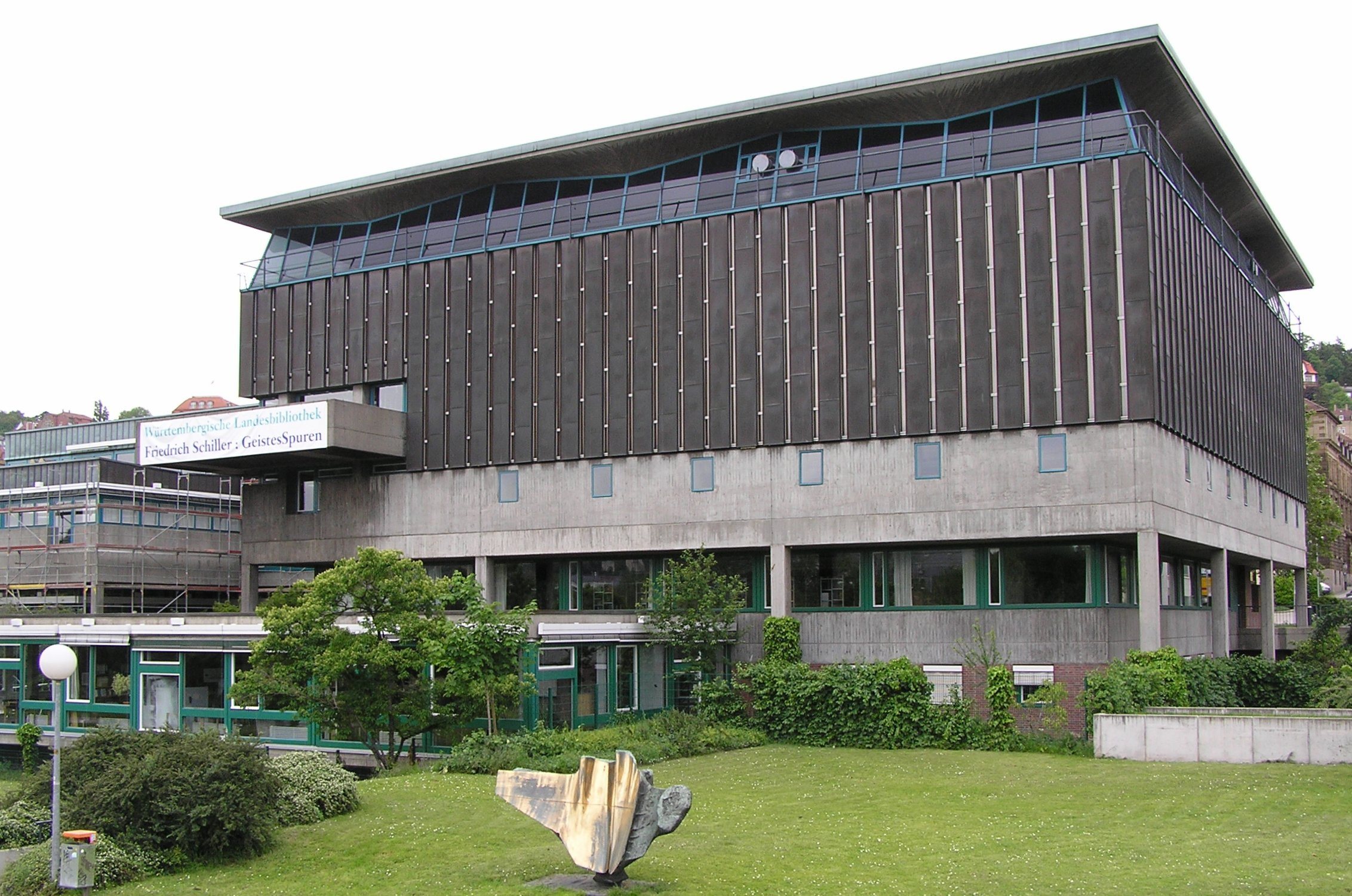
- Since 2000, the BfZ is a department of the Württembergische Landesbibliothek
- 48°46′29″N 9°11′17″E
- Location: Stuttgart, Germany
- Established: 1915

Other information
- Website: www.wlb-stuttgart.de/sammlungen/bibliothek-fuer-zeitgeschichte/

The Library of Contemporary History (German: Bibliothek für Zeitgeschichte) is one of Europe's largest special libraries for contemporary history, located in Stuttgart, Germany.

== History ==
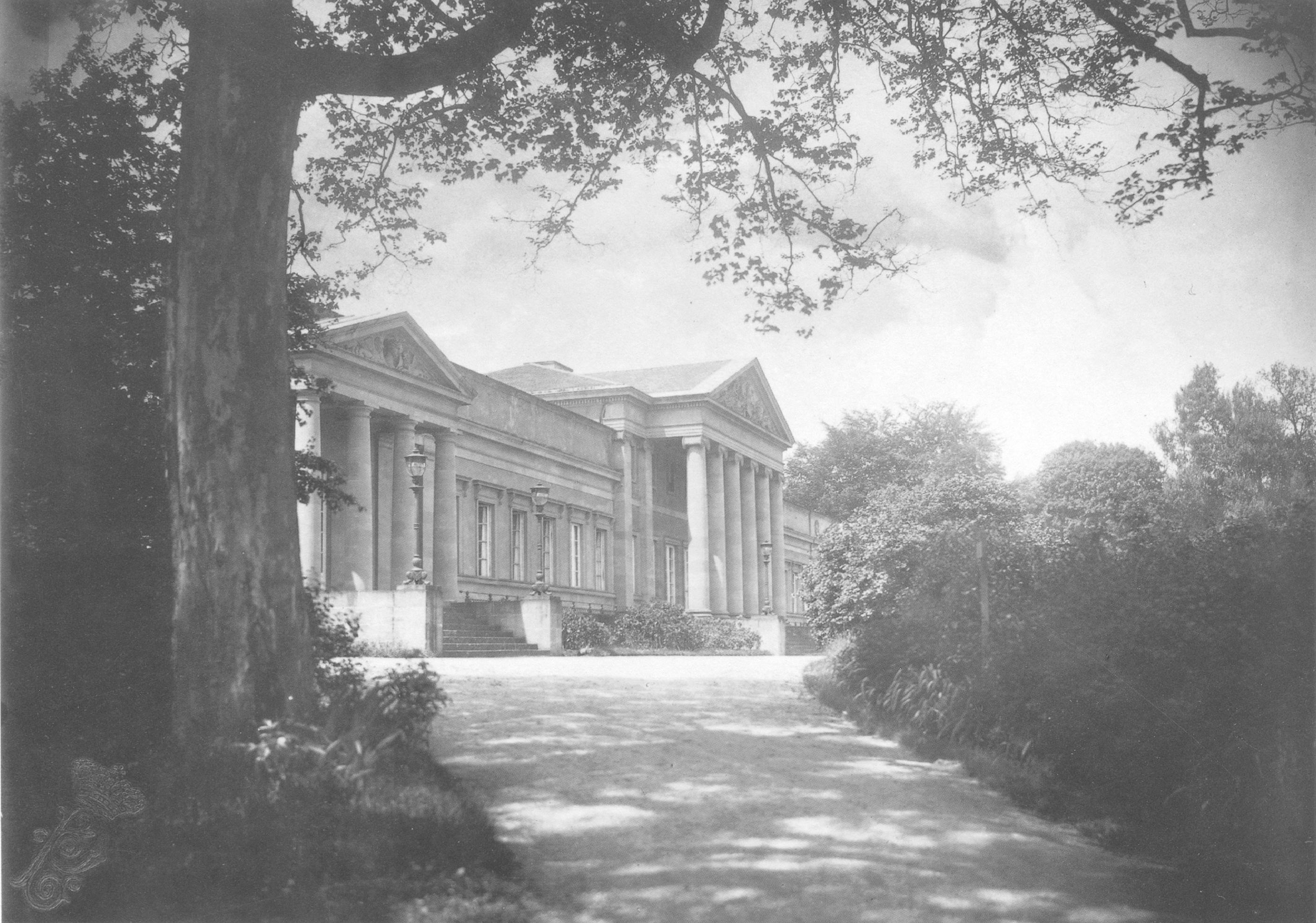
Schloss Rosenstein, home of the Weltkriegsbücherei from 1921 to 1944

The library was founded in 1915 in Berlin by coffee substitute entrepreneur Richard Frank as a private collection. Its purpose was to document the First World War by collecting unconventional media like leaflets, posters and brochures. After the war, the collection moved to Schloss Rosenstein in Stuttgart and was opened as the Weltkriegsbücherei to the public in 1921. In September 1944, the library (in Rosenstein Castle) was almost completely destroyed in an Allied air raid on Stuttgart.

In 1948, the Weltkriegsbücherei was renamed to the Bibliothek für Zeitgeschichte, BfZ for short. The library moved into the new building of the Württembergische Landesbibliothek in 1951. After being an independent institution for several decades, it finally became a department of the Württemberg State Library in 2000.

The library's collection focuses on military history, civil wars, foreign affairs, security policy, New Social Movements, the history of genocide and state terrorism, as well as peace and conflict studies. The collection currently consists of more than 400,000 books and 480 subscribed journals.

The library published numerous publications, and organizes regular public lectures on topics of contemporary history. Since January 2020, the lectures have been recorded in cooperation with the Gerda Henkel Stiftung and made available on the online portal L.I.S.A..

== Special collections ==
The collection of books and periodicals is complemented by three special collections:

- Zeit der Weltkriege (Era of World Wars from 1914 to 1945) includes photographs, posters, leaflets, and archives of personal documents. Examples include memoirs, diaries, and letters from combatants as well as civilians of both World Wars.
- Marine (Naval Archive) comprises a collection of around 500,000 photographs of warships and merchant ships from all over the world between 1850 and 1990, as well as a collection of naval history with marine charts, construction drawings, blueprints and text documents (torpedo reports, war diaries, manuscripts, etc.).
- Neue Soziale Bewegungen (New Social Movements) focuses on the domestic political disputes in the Federal Republic of Germany since the 1960s (including student movements, peace movements, and anti nuclear movements). The collection comprises grey literature (journals, brochures, leaflets) as well as posters.

== Own editions ==
- Schriften der Bibliothek für Zeitgeschichte / First series Volume 1.1962 – 28.1990;
- Schriften der Bibliothek für Zeitgeschichte / Second series Volume 1.1993 – 27.2013
- Chronology of the War at Sea: 1939–1945 / Jürgen Rohwer; Gerhard Hümmelchen. – 3. rev.. ed. London: Chatham, 2005, ISBN 1-86176-257-7
- Online Resource: Chronik des Seekrieges 1939–1945. Revised edition. Stuttgart: WLB, 2007 ff.
- Brill's Encyclopedia of the First World War / ed. by Gerhard Hirschfeld; Gerd Krumeich; Irina Renz. – Leiden : Brill, 2012. – ISBN 978-90-04-23376-8

== Secondary literature ==
- 100 Jahre Bibliothek für Zeitgeschichte: 1915 – 2015 / Christian Westerhoff (ed.). – Stuttgart, Württembergische Landesbibliothek, 2015, ISBN 978-3-88282-080-5
- 1914 – 1918, Orages de papier : les collections de guerre des bibliothèques / ed. by Christophe Didier; Christian Baechler. – Paris : Somogy, Éd. d'Art; Strasbourg: BNU, Bibl. Nat. Univ., 2008, ISBN 978-2-7572-0225-8, ISBN 2-85923-036-X
