= Lothar Kettenacker =

German historian

Lothar Kettenacker (born 1939) is a historian of Germany in the twentieth century. He is a former research fellow and deputy director of the German Historical Institute London.

== Selected publications ==
- Nationalsozialistische Volkstumspolitik im Elsaß. Deutsche Verlagsanstalt, 1973.
- (ed.): Das “Andere Deutschland” im Zweiten Weltkrieg. Emigration und Widerstand in internationaler Perspektive. Klett, Stuttgart 1977.
- with Wolfgang J. Mommsen (eds.): The Fascist Challenge and the Policy of Appeasement. Allen & Unwin, 1983.
- with Gerhard Hirschfeld (eds.): Der "Führerstaat", Mythos und Realität: Studien zur Struktur und Politik des Dritten Reiches. Klett-Cotta, Stuttgart 1981.
- Krieg zur Friedenssicherung. Die Deutschlandplanung der britischen Regierung während des Zweiten Weltkrieges. Vandenhoeck & Ruprecht, Göttingen 1989.
- with Günther Heydemann (eds.): Kirchen in der Diktatur. Drittes Reich und SED-Staat. Fünfzehn Beiträge. Vandenhoeck & Ruprecht, Göttingen 1993.
- Germany Since 1945. Oxford University Press, Oxford 1997.
- (ed.): Ein Volk von Opfern? Die neue Debatte um den Bombenkrieg 1940–45. Rowohlt, 2003.
- Germany 1989: In the Aftermath of the Cold War. Longman, 2009.
- mit Torsten Riotte (eds.): The Legacies of Two World Wars. European Societies in The Twentieth Century. Berghahn Books, 2011.
