= Patrick Finney =

British historian

Patrick Finney is a international relations and collective memory historian, specifically focusing on inter-war periods of World War II and historiographical and conceptual issues. He is a UK editor for Rethinking History and currently works at the Department of International Politics at Aberystwyth University.

== Career ==
Finney earned his BA in International History and a PhD from the University of Leeds.

He is a Fellow of the Royal Historical Society, and was the Chair of the British International History Group from 2017-2024.

== Publications ==
Finney has authored various books including:

- Remembering the Road to World War Two
- Authenticity Reading, Remembering, Performing
