= Functionalism–intentionalism debate =

Historiographical debate on Holocaust causes

In Holocaust studies, the functionalism–intentionalism debate is a historiographical controversy about the origins of the Holocaust in Nazi Germany and German-occupied Europe in World War II. The debate focuses on the transition, c. 1941–1942, from state-sanctioned discrimination, forced displacement, and sporadic violence against Jews towards genocidal mass extermination. Key themes include the personal role of Adolf Hitler, Nazi ideology, and the role of lower-level party officials and civil servants.

"Intentionalist" historians argue that Hitler consciously planned and ordered the extermination of Jews. They stress the exterminatory antisemitism within Nazi ideology and the Holocaust's relationship to the German invasion of the Soviet Union. "Functionalists", by contrast, argue that the transition occurred incrementally as a result of decisions made at lower levels of the Nazi Party and bureaucracy in German-occupied Eastern Europe, especially associated with the General Government administration. They tend to emphasise the decentralized nature of Nazi rule and argue that extermination was only adopted in response to the "failure" of earlier discriminatory policies like forced displacement. Individual "intentionalist" and "functionalist" historians have taken different approaches and some historians have attempted to synthesize both approaches.

The terms were coined in a 1981 essay by the British Marxist historian Timothy Mason. Notable functionalists have included Timothy Mason, Raul Hilberg, Karl Schleunes, Christopher Browning, Hans Mommsen, Martin Broszat, Götz Aly, Christian Gerlach, Zygmunt Bauman, Timothy Snyder and David Cesarani. Notable intentionalists have included William Shirer, Hugh Trevor-Roper, Alan Bullock, Karl Bracher, Andreas Hillgruber, Klaus Hildebrand, Eberhard Jäckel, Leni Yahil, Israel Gutman, Gerhard Weinberg, Walter Laqueur, Saul Friedländer, Richard Breitman, Lucy Dawidowicz and Daniel Goldhagen.

== Origin ==
In 1981, the British historian Timothy Mason published an essay entitled "Intention and Explanation" that was in part an attack on the scholarship of Karl Dietrich Bracher and Klaus Hildebrand, both of whom Mason accused of focusing too much on Hitler as an explanation of the Holocaust. In this essay, Mason called the followers of "the twisted road to Auschwitz" (or structuralist school) "functionalists" because of their belief that the Holocaust arose as part of the functioning of the Nazi state, while the followers of "the straight road to Auschwitz" (or programmist school) were called "intentionalists" because of their belief that it was Hitler's intentions alone that explained the Holocaust. The terms "intentionalist" and "functionalist" have largely replaced the previous terms used to signify the conflicting schools of thought.

== Arguments ==
Historians who take an intentionalist line, like Andreas Hillgruber, argue that everything that happened after Operation Barbarossa was part of a master plan he credited Hitler with developing in the 1920s. Hillgruber wrote in his 1967 book Germany and the Two World Wars that

...the conquest of European Russia, the cornerstone of the continental European phase of his program, was thus for Hitler inextricably linked with the extermination of these "bacilli", the Jews. In his conception they had gained dominance over Russia with the Bolshevik Revolution. Russia thereby became the center from which a global danger radiated, particularly threatening to the Aryan race and its German core. To Hitler, Bolshevism meant the consummate rule of Jewry, while democracy—as it had developed in Western Europe and Weimar Germany—represented a preliminary stage of Bolshevism, since the Jews there won a leading, if not yet a dominant, influence. This racist component of Hitler's thought was so closely interwoven with the central political element of his program, the conquest of European Russia, that Russia's defeat and the extermination of the Jews were—in theory as later in practice—inseparable for him. To the aim of expansion per se, however, Hitler gave not racial, but political, strategic, economic and demographic underpinnings".

The German historian Helmut Krausnick argued:

What is certain is that the nearer Hitler's plan to overthrow Russia as the last possible enemy on the continent of Europe approached maturity, the more he became obsessed with an idea—with which he had been toying as a "final solution" for a long time—of wiping out the Jews in the territories under his control. It cannot have been later than March 1941, when he openly declared his intention of having the political commissars of the Red Army shot, that he issued his secret decree—which never appeared in writing though it was mentioned verbally on several occasions—that the Jews should be eliminated.

Alfred Streim wrote in response that Krausnick had been taken in by the line invented after the war to reduce the responsibility of the Einsatzgruppen leaders brought to trial. Klaus Hildebrand wrote:

In qualitative terms, the executions by shooting were no different from the technically more efficient accomplishment of the 'physical final solution' by gassing, of which they were a prelude.

Against the intentionalist interpretation, functionalist historians like Martin Broszat argued that the lower officials of the Nazi state had started exterminating people on their own initiative. Broszat argued that the Holocaust began "bit by bit" as German officials stumbled into genocide. Broszat argued that in the autumn of 1941 German officials had begun "improvised" killing schemes as the "simplest" solution to the "Jewish Question". In Broszat's opinion, Hitler subsequently approved of the measures initiated by the lower officials and allowed the expansion of the Holocaust from Eastern Europe to all of Europe. In this way, Broszat argued that the Shoah was not begun in response to an order, written or unwritten, from Hitler but was rather "a way out of the blind alley into which the Nazis had manoeuvred themselves". The American historian Christopher Browning argued:

Before the invasion, the Einsatzgruppen were not given explicit orders for the total extermination of Jews on Soviet territory. Along with the general incitement to an ideological and racial war, however, they were given the general task of liquidating "potential" enemies. Heydrich's much-debated directive of 2 July 1941 was a minimal list of those who had to be liquidated immediately, including all Jews in state and party positions. It is very likely, moreover, that the Einsatzgruppen leaders were told of the future goal of a Judenfrei [Jew-free] Russia through systematic mass murder.

By contrast, the Swiss historian Philippe Burrin argues that such a decision was not made before August 1941 at the earliest, pointing to orders given by Himmler on 30 July 1941 to the 2nd SS Cavalry Regiment and the SS Cavalry Brigade operating in the Pripet Marshes in the Pripyat Marshes massacres calling for the murder of male Jews only while the Jewish women and children were to be driven into the Marshes. Browning argues that sometime in mid-July 1941 Hitler made the decision to begin general genocide owing to his exhilaration over his victories over the Red Army, whereas Burrin contends that the decision was made in late August 1941 owing to Hitler's frustration over the slowing down of the Wehrmacht. Kershaw argues that the dramatic expansion in both the range of victims and the intensity of the killings after mid-August 1941 indicates that Hitler issued an order to that effect, most probably a verbal order conveyed to the Einsatzgruppen commanders through either Himmler or Heydrich. It remains unclear whether that was a decision made on Hitler's own initiative motivated only by his own antisemitic prejudices, or (impressed with the willingness and ability of Einsatzgruppe A to murder Jewish women and children) ordered that the other three Einsatzgruppen emulate Einsatzgruppe A's bloody example.

The Canadian historian Erich Haberer has contended that the "Baltic flashpoint of genocide", as the killings committed by Einsatzgruppe A between July–October 1941 are known to historians, were the key development in the evolution of Nazi antisemitic policy that resulted in the Holocaust. The Baltic area witnessed both the most extensive and intense killings of all the Einsatzgruppen with 90,000–100,000 Jews killed between July and October 1941, which led to the almost total destruction of the Jewish communities in that area. Haberer maintains that the "Baltic flashpoint of genocide" occurred at a time when the other Nazi plans for a "territorial final solution" such as the Madagascar Plan were unlikely to occur, and thus suggested to the Nazi leadership that genocide was indeed "feasible" as a "final solution to the Jewish Question".

== Functionalism ==
=== Extreme ===
Extreme functionalists such as Martin Broszat believe that the Nazi leadership did not consciously initiate the Holocaust and that initiative instead came from the lower ranks of the German bureaucracy. This philosophy is what is known as the bottom-up approach of the Holocaust. Götz Aly has made much of documents from the bureaucracy of the German Government-General of Poland arguing that the population of Poland would have to decrease by 25% to allow the Polish economy to grow. Additional criticism of functionalism points out that Hitler and other Nazi leaders delayed railcars providing supplies to front line troops in the Soviet Union so that Jews could be deported by rail from the USSR to death camps, thus demonstrating the pursuit of genocidal policies over pragmatic wartime actions. Hans Mommsen was a leading expert on Nazi Germany and the Holocaust. He argued that Hitler was a "weak dictator" who rather than acting decisively, reacted to various social pressures. Mommsen believed that Nazi Germany was not a totalitarian state and criticized totalitarianism as a concept in general. Together with his friend Broszat, Mommsen developed a structuralist interpretation of the Third Reich, that saw the Nazi state as a chaotic collection of rival bureaucracies engaged in endless power struggles, and the Final Solution as a result of the "cumulative radicalization" of the German state as opposed to a long-term plan on the part of Hitler.

=== Moderate ===
Moderate functionalists, such as Karl Schleunes and Christopher Browning, believe that the rivalry within the unstable Nazi power structure provided the major driving force behind the Holocaust. Moderate functionalists believe that the Nazis aimed to expel all of the Jews from Europe, but only after the failure of these schemes did they resort to genocide. This is sometimes referred to as the "twisted road" to extermination, after a book by Schleunes called The Twisted Road to Auschwitz.

== Intentionalism ==
=== Extreme ===
Lucy Dawidowicz argued that Hitler already decided upon the Holocaust no later than 1919. To support her interpretation, Dawidowicz pointed to numerous extreme anti-Semitic statements made by Hitler. According to a Reichswehr report from an April 1920 meeting, Hitler said: "We will carry on the struggle until the last Jew is removed from the German Reich". A Bavarian police report reported that according to Hitler, the NSDAP would bring about a revolution that would "thoroughly clean out the Jew-rabble". Hitler directly referenced killing Jews in Mein Kampf, when he states: "If at the beginning of the war and during the war twelve or fifteen thousand of these Hebrew corrupters of the people had been held under poison gas, as happened to hundreds of thousands of our very best German workers in the field, the sacrifice of millions at the front would not have been in vain." However, Dawidowicz's critics contend, given that Mein Kampf is 694 pages long, she makes too much of one sentence. Daniel Goldhagen went further, suggesting that popular opinion in Germany was already sympathetic to a policy of Jewish extermination before the Nazi party came to power. He asserts in his book Hitler's Willing Executioners that Germany enthusiastically welcomed the persecution of Jews by the Nazi regime in the period 1933–39. Dawidowicz responded that Hitler resorted to vague terms intentionally, often using esoteric and unclear language when discussing the Jews; she remarks that the esoteric and vague language was an inherent element of Nazi rhetoric, as Heinrich Himmler repeated Hitler's vague terms from the 1920s as late as on 4 October 1943, when addressing the SS-Gruppenführer. Dawidowicz highlights that there was no reason to use vague terms to "that particular audience on that occasion at that late date".

Holocaust scholars such as John J. Michalczyk, Michael S. Bryant and Susan A. Michalczyk agree with Dawidowicz, arguing that Hitler already revealed his "exterminatory mindset" in Mein Kampf, infusing the book with "intimations of genocide". They state that Hitler's autobiography is redolent of calls for mass murder, and argue that "genocide is the inescapable conclusion entailed in Hitler’s premises". In his book, Hitler did argue that the existence of Germany as a country is threatened, portrayed the Jews as a danger to both Germany and the human race, and argued that the right to self-preservation is supreme and cancels all ethical restraint; these premises made the Final Solution a foreseeable conclusion. According to Bryant, Hitler calls for Final Solution in Mein Kampf, but conceals it with vague and esoteric language. This vagueness was caused by the circumstances Hitler faced after the failure of the Beer Putsch - Hitler wanted to obtain parole, avoid deportation to Austria and eventually have the bans that he and his party were facing lifted; this forced Hitler to "walk a legal line". Bryant concludes: "Hitler continued to dissemble his real intentions through the 1930s, falsely assuring the world of his peaceful inclinations toward countries he had rashly threatened in his memoir".

Dawidowicz points to accounts of 1920s recruits to the early years of Nazism as a movement. Kurt Lüdecke, a German nationalist who joined the NSDAP and personally talked to Hitler, noted plans that Hitler expressed: "The hugeness of the task and the absurdity of the hope swept over me. Its execution meant the liquidation of Jewry, of Rome, of liberalism with its tangled capitalistic connections; of Marxism, Bolshevism, Toryism—in short, an abrupt and complete break with the past and an assault on all existing world political forces." Dawidowicz contends that while Hitler's anti-Semitism and related threats "remained geographically limited to Germany, albeit a greater Germany", he began to see Jews as "an international group whose destruction demanded an international policy". This change took place after Hitler met Alfred Rosenberg, who shared genocidal intentions towards Jews and greatly influenced Hitler; as a result, Hitler now discussed "cleaning up" the Jews internationally rather than domestically. Dawidowicz concludes that Hitler conceived his plans long before coming to power, and everything he did from then on was directed toward the achievement of his goal: "There never had been any ideological deviation or wavering determination. In the end only the question of opportunity mattered."

Wolfgang Benz points out that Hitler had already called for anti-Semitism in a 1919 publication "Gutachten zum Antisemitismus" and declared: "Its ultimate goal, however, must unalterably be the removal of the Jews altogether." That this "removal" meant for him the extermination of the Jews is shown by Hitler in a speech on 6 April 1920: "We do not want to be sentimental anti-Semites who want to create a pogrom mood, but we are animated by the implacable determination to seize the evil at its root and to exterminate it root and branch. In order to achieve our goal, any means must be acceptable to us, even if we have to join forces with the devil." On 3 July 1920 Hitler wrote to Konstantin Hierl: "As much as I cannot reproach a tubercle bacilli for an activity which means destruction for man but life for them, I am also compelled and entitled, for the sake of my personal existence, to wage the fight against tuberculosis by destroying its pathogens. The Jew, however, becomes and has become through thousands of years in his work the racial tuberculosis of the peoples. To fight him is to destroy him."

According to the journalist Josef Hell, Hitler is said to have replied to the question of what he would do against the Jews if he had full freedom of action:

When I am once really in power, then the extermination of the Jews will be my first and most important task. As soon as I have the power to do so, I will, for example, in Munich on Marienplatz I will have gallows set up next to gallows, and as many as the traffic permits. Then the Jews are hanged, one after the other, and they hang until they stink. They are hanged as long as the laws of hygiene allow. As soon as they have been hanged, the next ones are hanged, and this continues until the last Jew in Munich has been exterminated. The same thing will be done in the other cities until Germany is cleansed of the last Jew.

In 1924, Hitler further unfolded the racist rationale for it in Mein Kampf, also picking up on the views of Karl Eugen Dühring: Without clear recognition of the racial problem, and thus of the Jewish question, a resurgence of the German nation will no longer take place.

=== Moderate ===
Moderate intentionalists such as Richard Breitman and Saul Friedlander believe that Hitler decided upon the Holocaust sometime after coming to power in the 1930s and no later than 1939 or 1941. This school refers to Hitler's "Prophecy Speech" of 30 January 1939 before the Reichstag where Hitler stated "If the international Jewish financiers in and outside Europe should succeed in plunging the nations once again into a world war, then the result will not be the victory of Jewry, but the annihilation of the Jewish race in Europe!" Yehuda Bauer criticizes the intentionalist reading of this quotation, arguing that though this statement clearly commits Hitler to genocide, Hitler made no effort after delivering this speech to have it carried out. Furthermore, Ian Kershaw has pointed out that there are several diary entries by Joseph Goebbels in late 1941, in which Goebbels writes that "The Führer's prophecy is coming true in a most terrible way." The general impression one gets is that Goebbels is quite surprised that Hitler was serious about carrying out the threat in the "Prophecy Speech". According to Lucy Dawidowicz, if Hitler's allies expressed surprise at the implementation of a systematic genocide, it was not because of "the suddenness with which they had to confront these plans, but because of lack of preparation".

Eberhard Jäckel argues that the genocide of Jews on a systematic and industrial level was already decided at the highest level before 1939. Jäckel notes that Hitler himself had announced the "annihilation of the Jewish race in Europe" in the event of a new war in a public speech on the anniversary of his "seizure of power" on 30 January 1939. Therefore when announcing the "annihilation of Jewish race" in event of war in the 30 January 1939 Reichstag speech in the Kroll Opera House, Hitler had already been preparing for war in advance and was now justifying the genocide that would accompany it. This is supported by the fact that the Nazi leadership started rearming shortly after coming to power in 1933; Richard Overy remarks that for Hitler the "economy was not simply an arena for generating wealth and technical progress; its raison d'etre lay in its ability to provide the material springboard for military conquest". Because of that, the progressing militarisation and rearmanent of the German economy became "economically significant" as early as in 1934, and signalled Hitler's intention to start a war. In this context, intentional historians argue that the Madagascar Plan was ultimately never a serious option for the Nazi leadership, but merely a consideration presented to the outside world in order to conceal from the public the actual goal that was being pursued.

Evidence used by intentionalist historians such as Kevin Sweeney to support the view that Hitler had decided on the Holocaust by the start of the war includes a statement by Hitler to František Chvalkovský in 1939 that "We are going to destroy the Jews. They are not going to get away with what they did on 9 November 1918. The day of reckoning has come." Sweeney argues that this and other public and private statements by Hitler before and during the war indicate that he had personally premeditated the Holocaust and was responsible for directing the policy.

== Synthesis ==
A number of scholars such as Arno J. Mayer, Yehuda Bauer, Peter Longerich, Ian Kershaw, Michael Burleigh, Frank McDonough and Michael Marrus have developed a synthesis of the functionalist and intentionalist schools. They have suggested the Holocaust was a result of pressures that came from both above and below and that Hitler lacked a master plan, but was the decisive force behind the Holocaust. The phrase 'cumulative radicalisation' is used in this context to sum up the way extreme rhetoric and competition among different Nazi agencies produced increasingly extreme policies, as fanatical bureaucratic underlings put into practice what they believed Hitler would have approved based on his widely disseminated speeches and propaganda. This phenomenon is referred to more generally in social psychology as groupshift.

Given the fact that scholars have written so much in relation to Nazi Germany, Richard Bessel asserts that "The result is a much better informed, much more detailed and more nuanced picture of the Nazi regime, and most serious historians of the Nazi regime now are to some extent both 'intentionalists' and 'functionalists'—insofar as those terms still can be used at all."

== See also ==
- Holocaust denial
- Bottom-up approach of the Holocaust
- Nazi foreign policy debate
  - Auschwitz bombing debate
- Historiography of Germany
  - Historikerstreit
  - Sonderweg
  - Vergangenheitsbewältigung
  - Victim theory, a theory that Austria was a victim of Nazism following the Anschluss
- The purpose of a system is what it does

== Sources ==
- Aly, Götz & Susanne Heim. Architects of annihilation: Auschwitz and the logic of destruction. Princeton, NJ: Princeton University Press, 2002.
- Bauer, Yehuda. Rethinking the Holocaust. New Haven Conn.; London: Yale University Press, 2001.
- Bessel, Richard. "Functionalists vs. Intentionalists: The Debate Twenty Years on or Whatever Happened to Functionalism and Intentionalism?" German Studies Review Vol. 26, no. 1 (2003): pp. 15–20.
- Bracher, Karl Dietrich The German Dictatorship; The Origins, Structure, and Effects of National Socialism. translated from the German by Jean Steinberg; With an Introduction by Peter Gay, New York, Praeger 1970.
- Breitman, Richard. The architect of genocide: Himmler and the Final Solution. New York: Knopf: Distributed by Random House, 1991.
- Broszat, Martin. German National Socialism, 1919–1945 translated from the German by Kurt Rosenbaum and Inge Pauli Boehm, Santa Barbara, Calif., Clio Press, 1966.
- Broszat, Martin. The Hitler State: The Foundation and Development of the Internal Structure of the Third Reich London: Longman, 1981.
- Broszat, Martin (1985). "Genesis of the 'Final Solution': An Assessment of David Irving's Theses". In Koch, H.W (ed.). Aspects of the Third Reich. St. Martin's Press. pp. 390–429. ISBN 978-0-312-05726-8.
- Browning, Christopher R. Fateful months: essays on the emergence of the final solution, 1941–42. New York: Holmes & Meier, 1985.
- Browning, Christopher (1986). "Nazi Ghettoization Policy in Poland: 1939–41". Central European History. 19 (4): 343–368. doi:10.1017/s0008938900011158. JSTOR 4546081. S2CID 145506134.
- Browning, Christopher R. The path to genocide: essays on launching the final solution. Cambridge: Cambridge University Press, 1992.
- Browning, Christopher R. Nazi policy, Jewish workers, German killers. Cambridge; New York: Cambridge University Press, 2000.
- Browning, Christopher R. The origins of the Final Solution: the evolution of Nazi Jewish policy, September 1939 – March 1942 Lincoln: University of Nebraska Press, 2004.
- Burrin, Philippe Hitler and the Jews: the genesis of the Holocaust London; New York: Edward Arnold; New York, NY: Distributed in the US by Routledge, Chapman, and Hall, 1994.
- Dawidowicz, Lucy S. The war against the Jews, 1933–1945 New York: Holt, Rinehart and Winston, 1975.
- Fleming, Gerald Hitler and the Final Solution Berkeley: University of California Press, 1984.
- Haberer, Erich (2001). "Intention and Feasibility: Reflections on Collaboration and the Final Solution". East European Jewish Affairs. 31 (2): 64–81. doi:10.1080/13501670108577951. OCLC 210897979. S2CID 143574047.
- Hilberg, Raul The Destruction of the European Jews Yale University Press, 2003, c1961.
- Hildebrand, Klaus Das Dritte Reich Muenchen: Oldenbourg, 1980 translated into English by P.S. Falla as The Third Reich, London: G. Allen & Unwin, 1984.
- Hillgruber, Andreas (1981). Germany And The Two World Wars. Cambridge, Mass.: Harvard University Press. ISBN 978-0-674-35321-3.
- Kershaw, Sir Ian Hitler, 1889–1936: Hubris, New York: Norton, 1999, 1998.
- Kershaw, Sir Ian The Nazi dictatorship: problems and perspectives of interpretation London: Arnold; New York: Copublished in the US by Oxford University Press, 2000.
- Kershaw, Sir Ian Hitler, 1936–45: Nemesis, New York: W.W. Norton, 2000.
- Kershaw, Ian (2008). Hitler, the Germans, and the Final Solution. New Haven, Conn.: Yale University Press. ISBN 978-0-300-12427-9.
- Jäckel, Eberhard Hitler in history Hanover, NH: Published for Brandeis University Press by University Press of New England, 1984.
- Marrus, Michael (2000). The Holocaust in History. Toronto: Key Porter. ISBN 978-1-55263-120-1.
- Mason, Timothy. "Intention and Explanation: A Current Controversy about the Interpretation of National Socialism", in: Gerhard Hirschfeld and Lothar Kettenacker, eds., The "Führer State": Myth and Reality. Studies on the Structure and Policies of the Third Reich (Stuttgart: Klett-Cotta, 1981), 23-42.
- Mommsen, Hans. From Weimar to Auschwitz Princeton, N.J.: Princeton University Press, 1991.
- Rees, Laurence (1997). The Nazis: A Warning From History. foreword by Sir Ian Kershaw. New York: New Press. ISBN 978-1-56584-551-0.
- Roseman, Mark. The Wannsee Conference and the Final Solution:A Reconsideration. New York: Metropolitan Books, 2002.
- Rosenbaum, Ron Explaining Hitler: the search for the origins of his evil, New York: Random House, 1998
- Schleunes, Karl. The Twisted Road to Auschwitz; Nazi Policy Toward German Jews, 1933–1939, Urbana: University of Illinois Press, 1970.
- Streim, Alfred (1989). "The Tasks of the SS Einsatzgruppen". In Marrus, Michael (ed.). The Nazi Holocaust, Part 3, The "Final Solution": The Implementation of Mass Murder, Volume 2. Westpoint, CT: Meckler. pp. 436–454. ISBN 978-0-88736-266-8.
