= Bottom-up approach of the Holocaust =

Hypothesis regarding the origins of the Holocaust

The bottom-up approach is a viewpoint on the causes of the Holocaust. This viewpoint focuses on those of lower rank and their pressuring of higher ranks to implement the Final Solution.

This approach is usually housed under a common debate in understanding the Holocaust, known as the functionalism versus intentionalism debate. Functionalists represent the argument that the decision to kill the Jews developed over time with a concept called "cumulative radicalization" (Hans Mommsen). Intentionalists, on the other hand, believe that the Final Solution was intended to occur all along and use antisemitism to prove this point. In the functionalism versus intentionalism debate, the bottom-up approach originated under the functionalist perspective. Götz Aly, specifically, has argued the case for the bottom-up approach from the functionalist view.

== Application ==
In Götz Aly's book 'Final Solution': Nazi Population Policy and the Murder of the European Jews, Aly points to a very specific proposal by Rolf-Heinz Höppner, who at the time was simply an SS-Obersturmbannführer (or an SS Officer). This letter written by Höppner was sent to Adolf Eichmann about a viable solution to solve the Jewish question. In a portion of the letter he wrote:

There is a danger that, in the coming winter, it will become impossible to feed all the Jews. It must seriously be considered whether the most humane solution is to finish off the Jews unfit for labour through some fast-acting means. This would definitely be more pleasant than letting them starve to death.

The letter, which was sent on July 16, 1941, is one that functionalists arguing the bottom-up approach utilize as evidence. Aly goes deeper and explains that the letter had not only been written by Höppner, but it had also been discussed at a lower level. Götz Aly writes, "Thus it was the lowest ranks of the resettlement apparatus that thought up 'things' which, it was said, 'sometimes [sounded] fantastic'."

Aly is not the only one that argues that the lower ranks were responsible for bringing about The Final Solution—though he is the most recognized. Dan Stone, author of the book Histories of the Holocaust, asserts that "The perpetrators on the ground were not automatons who simply followed instructions from Berlin; they were much worse—active agents who drove the murder process forward at every stage." However, he is less extreme than Götz Aly since he gives the leadership credit for making the process a reality. Stone cites the work of the Einsatzgruppen in the months leading up to the decision to exterminate the Jews. As Timothy D. Snyder, author of the somewhat controversial book Bloodlands: Europe Between Hitler and Stalin, describes the situation, Einsatzgruppen were being used as a way to tally up mass shootings of Jews to report back to Reichsführer-SS Heinrich Himmler as a method to continue rising in ranks.

== Competing approaches ==
=== Top-bottom approach ===
Whereas the bottom-up approach is almost exclusively assigned to the functionalist standpoint, the top-bottom perspective can lend a hand to either side of the argument.

Intentionalists use the top-bottom approach to solidify their conclusion that the intent to kill the Jews was always present in the higher-ranked officials. For this idea, they point specifically to Hitler's Mein Kampf, where he, essentially, calls for the extermination of European Jews. Therefore, the idea goes that Hitler, who intended to eradicate Europe of Jews, passed down an order (physical evidence of which has never been found) to eliminate all Jews in Europe.

Functionalists have also used the top-bottom approach. Functionalism simply claims that the solution to the Jewish question escalated over time, therefore, it does not overrule a top-bottom approach. Adolf Hitler, Heinrich Himmler and/or Reinhard Heydrich could have issued an order from the top to the bottom to eliminate the Jews in Europe without negating the thesis of functionalists.

== See also ==
- Functionalism versus intentionalism
- Nazi foreign policy debate
  - Auschwitz bombing debate
- Historiography of Germany
  - Historikerstreit
  - Sonderweg
  - Vergangenheitsbewältigung
  - Victim theory, a theory that Austria was a victim of Nazism following the Anschluss
