= Klaus Hildebrand =

German historian

- Born: 18 November 1941 (age 84); Bielefeld
- Occupation: Historian

Klaus Hildebrand (born 18 November 1941, Bielefeld, Germany) is a German liberal-conservative historian whose area of expertise is 19th–20th-century German political and military history.

== Biography ==
Hildebrand is commonly identified with the intentionalist interpretation of the origins of the Holocaust, emphasizing the central importance of Adolf Hitler's ideology and leadership in the development of the final solution. Writing in 1979, Hildebrand argued that Hitler's racial worldview constituted the fundamental basis of National Socialist genocide and programmatic ideas regarding the destruction of the Jews racial domination should be regarded as primary casual factors shaping the Third Reich's Jewish policy.

Working closely with Andreas Hillgruber, Hildebrand took the view that such events as the Shoah and Operation Barbarossa were all the unfolding of Hitler's master plan. Along similar lines, in a 1976 article, Hildebrand commented on left-wing historians of Nazi Germany that, in his view, were:

theoretically fixed, [...] vainly concerned with functional explanations of the autonomous force in history and as a result frequently contribute towards its trivialization.

Hildebrand has argued that the distinction drawn by the functionalists between the Einsatzgruppen massacres of Jews in the German-occupied parts of the Soviet Union in 1941–42 and between the rest of the Shoah is largely meaningless. Hildebrand wrote that,

in qualitative terms, the executions by shooting were no different from the technically more efficient accomplishment of the 'physical final solution' by gassing, of which they were a prelude.

In 1981, the British Marxist historian Timothy Mason in his essay 'Intention and explanation: A current controversy about the interpretation of National Socialism' from the book The "Fuehrer State" : Myth and reality coined the term 'intentionist' as part of an attack against Hildebrand and Karl Dietrich Bracher, both of whom Mason accused of focusing too much on Hitler as an explanation for the Holocaust.

Though Hildebrand is a leading advocate of the totalitarianism school and rejects any notion of generic fascism as intellectually inadequate, he does believe that the Third Reich was characterized by what he deems "authoritarian anarchy". However, Hildebrand believes in contrast to the work of Martin Broszat and Hans Mommsen that the "authoritarian anarchy" caused by numerous competing bureaucracies strengthened, not weakened Hitler's power. In Hildebrand's opinion, the "Hitler factor" was indeed the central causal agent of the Third Reich. Hildebrand has argued against the Sonderweg view of German history championed by the Mommsen brothers.

In the 1970s Hildebrand was deeply involved in a rancorous debate with Hans-Ulrich Wehler over the merits of traditional diplomatic history versus social history as way of explaining foreign policy. Together with Andreas Hillgruber, Hildebrand argued for the traditional Primat der Aussenpolitik ('primacy of foreign policy') approach with the focus on empirically examining the foreign policy making elite. Wehler by contrast argued for the Primat der Innenpolitik ('primacy of domestic politics') approach which called for seeing foreign policy largely as a reflection of domestic politics and employing theoretically based research into social history to examine domestic politics. Another area of difference between Hildebrand and his left-wing critics in the role of geography in German history. Hildebrand has argued that Germany's position as the "country in the middle" bordered by Russia and France has often limited the options of the German government in the 19th–20th centuries.

In regards to the Globalist-Continentalist debate between those argue that the Hitler's foreign policy at world conquest against those who argue that Nazi foreign policy aim only at the conquest of Europe, Hildebrand has consistently taken a Globalist position, arguing that the foreign policy of the Third Reich did indeed have world domination as its goal, with Hitler following a Stufenplan ('stage-by-stage plan') to reach that goal. In Hildebrand's opinion, Hitler's foreign policy aimed at nothing less than world conquest in his own lifetime, and those who argue otherwise are seriously misunderstanding the full scope of Hitler's ambitions. Hildebrand sees Hitler's "Programme" for world domination as comprising in an equal measure crafty power politics and fanatical racism. Together with Andreas Hillgruber and Gerhard Weinberg, Hildebrand is considered to be one of the leading Globalist scholars. Through Hildebrand does not maintain that Hitler was a free agent in foreign policy, and accepts that there were structural limitations upon Hitler's room to manoeuvre, he contends that these limitations only had the effect of pushing Hitler into the direction that he always wanted to go. However, Hildebrand does not favour an exclusively Hitlerist interpretation of German foreign policy in the era of the Third Reich. In Hildebrand's view, there were three other fractions within the NSDAP who advocated foreign policy programmes different from Hitler's. One fraction, whom Hildebrand dubs the "revolutionary socialists", supported an anti-Western policy with support for independence movements within the British Empire and an alignment with the Soviet Union. Most closely associated the Strasser brothers, Gregor and Otto the "revolutionary socialist" fraction played no important role in the foreign policy of the Third Reich. A rival fraction whom Hildebrand calls the "agrarians" centred around the agrarian leader Richard Walther Darré, the Party "race theorist" Alfred Rosenberg and the Reichsfũhrer-SS Heinrich Himmler, favoured an anti-industrial and anti-urban "blood and soil" ideology, expansion at the expense of the Soviet Union in order to acquire Lebensraum, alliance with Britain and opposition to the restoration of overseas colonies as threatening German racial purity. Another fraction, who Hildebrand refers to as the Wilhelmine Imperialists and whose leading personality was Hermann Göring, advocated at minimum the restoration of the borders of 1914 and the overseas empire, a zone of influence for Germany in Eastern Europe, and greater emphasis on traditional Machtpolitik as opposed to Hitler's racist vision of an endless and merciless Social Darwinist struggle between different "races" for Lebensraum. The emphasis on the restoration of German colonies implied an anti-British policy but, in general, the Wilhelmine Imperialists were cautious about the prospect of war with Britain, and preferred to restore the pre-1914 German colonial empire through diplomacy rather than war. Of the three fractions, it was the "agrarians" whose views were the closest to Hitler's programme, but Hildebrand argues that there was an important difference in that the "agrarians" saw an alliance with Britain as being the natural alignment of two "Aryan" powers, whereas for Hitler the proposed British alliance was more a matter of power politics.

Since 1982, Hildebrand has worked at the University of Bonn as a professor in medieval and modern history, with a special interest in the 19th and 20th centuries. Hildebrand's major work has been in diplomatic history and the development of the nation-state. He served as editor of the series concerning the publication of the documents of German foreign policy. In the mid-1980s, Hildebrand sat on a committee together with Thomas Nipperdey and Michael Stürmer in charge of vetting the publications issued by the Research Office of the West German Ministry of Defence. The committee attracted some controversy when it refused to publish a hostile biography of Gustav Noske.

In a 1983 speech, Hildebrand denied there had been a Sonderweg, and claimed that the Sonderweg applied only to the "special case" of the Nazi dictatorship In a 1984 essay, Hildebrand went further and wrote:

It remains to be seen, whether future scholarship will initiate a process of historicization of the Hitler period, for example by comparing it with Stalinist Russia and with examples such as the Stone Age Communism of Cambodia. This would doubtless be accompanied by terrifying scholarly insights and painful human experiences. Both phenomena could, horribile dictu, even relativize the concept of the German Sonderweg between 1933 and 1945 [...].

In response, Heinrich August Winkler argued that there was a Sonderweg before 1933, and that Germany as a country deeply influenced by the Enlightenment meant there was no point of comparison between Hitler on one hand, and Pol Pot and Stalin on the other In Germany, Hildebrand is well known for his disputes with the Mommsen brothers, Hans and Wolfgang over how best to understand Nazi Germany, especially evident at a conference held at the German Historical Institute in London in 1979 which resulted in numerous hostile exchanges.

In the Historikerstreit ('historians' dispute') of the 1980s, Hildebrand sided with those who contended that the Holocaust, while a major tragedy of the 20th century was not a uniquely evil event, but just one out of many genocides of the 20th century.

In a 1987 article, Hildebrand argued that both Nazi Germany and the Soviet Union were totalitarian, expansionary states that were destined to come into conflict with each other. Hildebrand argued that in response to concentrations of the Red Army near in the border in the spring of 1941, Hitler engaged in a Flucht nach vorn ('flight forward'; that is, responding to a danger by charging on rather than retreating). Hildebrand concluded that:

Independently, the National Socialist program of conquest met the equally far-reaching war-aims program which Stalin had drawn up in 1940 at the latest.

Hildebrand's critics such as the British historian Richard J. Evans accused Hildebrand of seeking to obscure German responsibility for the attack on the Soviet Union, and of not being well informed on Soviet foreign policy. Some champions of the "preventive war" theory were critical of Hildebrand for using the term Überfall ('fell upon') to describe Operation Barbarossa because it implied Hitler still had some freedom of choice in 1941. In a 1995 introduction to an essay about German-American relations by Detlef Junker, Hildebrand asserted that first Britain and then the United States in the 19th–20th centuries had a tendency to be highly ignorant of Central European affairs, and likewise had a propensity for engaging in "black legend" type of propaganda against Germany.

== Work ==
- Vom Reich zum Weltreich: Hitler, NSDAP und koloniale Frage 1919–1945, Munich: Fink, 1969.
- "Der "Fall" Hitler" pages 375–386 from Neue Politische Literatur, Volume 14, 1969.
- Bethmann Hollweg, der Kanzler ohne Eigenschaften? Urteile der Geschichtsschreibung, eine kritische Bibliographie, Düsseldorf, Droste 1970.
- "Hitlers Ort in der Geschichte des Preussische-Deutschen Nationalstaates" pages 584–631 from Historische Zeitschrift, Volume 217, 1973.
- Deutsche Aussenpolitik 1933–1945; Kalkül oder Dogma?, Stuttgart, Kohlhammer Verlag, 1970, translated by Anthony Fothergill into English as The Foreign Policy of the Third Reich, London: Batsford, 1973, ISBN 0-520-02528-8.
- "Hitlers "Programm" und seine Realisierung, 1939–1942" pages 178–224 from Kriegsbeginn 1939 Entfesslung oder Ausbruch des Zweiten Weltkriegs? Edited by Gottfried Niedhart, Darmstadt, 1976.
- "Hitler's War Aims" pages 522–530 from The Journal of Modern History, Volume 48, Issue # 3 September 1976.
- "Nationalsozialismus oder Hiterismus?" pages 555–561 from Persönlichkeit und Struktur in der Geschichte, Düsseldorf, 1977.
- Das Deutsche Reich und die Sowjetunion im internationalen System 1918–1932: Legitimität oder Revolution? Steiner, 1977, ISBN 3-515-02503-0.
- co-written with Andreas Hillgruber Kalkül zwischen Macht und Ideologie. Der Hitler- Stalin- Pakt : Parallelen bis heute? Fromm Druckhaus, 1980, ISBN 3-7201-5125-5.
- "Monokratie oder Polykraties? Hitlers Herrschaft und des Dritte Reich" pages 73–97 from Der 'Führerstaat': Mythos und Realität Studien zur Struktur und Politik des Dritten Reiches, Stuttgart, 1981.
- Das dritte Reich, München : Oldenbourg, 1979, translated into English by P.S. Falla as The Third Reich, London : G. Allen & Unwin, 1984 ISBN 0-04-943032-7.
- Von Erhard zur Grossen Koalition, Stuttgart: Deutsche Verlags-Anstalt, 1984.
- (editor) Deutsche Frage und europäisches Gleichgewicht: Festschrift für Andreas Hillgruber zum 60. Geburtstag, Köln: Böhlau Verlag, 1985, ISBN 3-412-07984-7.
- German Foreign Policy from Bismarck to Adenauer: The Limits of Statecraft, London: Unwin Hyman, 1989, ISBN 0-04-445070-2.
- Co-edited with Jürgen Schmadeke & Klaus Zernack 1939 – An Der Schwelle Zum Weltkrieg Die Entfesselung Des Zweiten Weltkrieges Und Das Internationale System , Berlin: Walter de Gruyter & Co 1990, ISBN 3-11-012596-X.
- Integration und Souveränität: Die Aussenpolitik der Bundesrepublik Deutschland, 1949–1982, Paris: Bouvier, 1991, ISBN 3-416-02285-8.
- "The Age of Tyrants: History and Politics The Administrators of the Enlightenment, the Risk of Scholarship and the Preservation of a Worldview A Reply to Jürgen Habermas" pages 50–55 & "He Who Wants to Escape the Abyss Will Have to Sound It Very Precisely: Is the New German History Writing Revisionist?" pages 188–195 from Forever In The Shadow of Hitler? edited by Ernst Piper, Humanities Press, Atlantic Highlands, New Jersey, 1993, ISBN 0-391-03784-6.
- Das vergangene Reich: Deutsche Aussenpolitik von Bismarck bis Hitler, 1871–1945, Deutsche Verlags-Anstalt 1995.
- The Reich - Nation-State - Great Power: Reflections on German Foreign Policy 1871–1945, London: German Historical Institute, 1995.
- "No Intervention": Die Pax Britannica und Preussen 1865/66–1869/70: Eine Untersuchung zur englischen Weltpolitik im 19. Jahrhundert, Munich: Oldenbourg 1997.
- Zwischen Politik und Religion. Studien zur Entstehung, Existenz und Wirkung des Totalitarismus, Oldenbourg Verlag: Munich 2003, ISBN 3-486-56748-9.

== Sources ==
- Evans, Richard J. (1989). In Hitler's Shadow: West German Historians and the Attempt to Escape from the Nazi Past. New York City: Pantheon Books. ISBN 978-0-394-57686-2. LCCN 88043239. OCLC 18740694. OL 2061583M. Wikidata Q140468023.
- Hildebrand, Klaus (1973). The Foreign Policy of the Third Reich. Translated by Fothergill, Anthony. London: Batsford Books. ISBN 0713411260. LCCN 73180481. OL 5477079M.
- Hildebrand, Klaus (1 December 1987). "Krieg im Frieden und Frieden im Krieg: Über das Problem der Legitimität in der Geschichte der Staatengesellschaft 1931–1941" [War in Peace and Peace in War. On the Problem of Legitimacy in the History of the Community of States, 1931–1941]. Historische Zeitschrift (in German). 244 (1): 1–28. doi:10.1524/hzhz.1987.244.jg.1. ISSN 2196-680X.
- Junker, Detlef [in German] (March 1995). The Manichaean Trap. American Perceptions of the German Empire, 1871–1945 (PDF) (Occasional Paper). Washington: German Historical Institute. Archived from the original (PDF) on 3 March 2016.
  - Hildebrand, Klaus (1995). Introduction. In Junker (1995), pp. 7–8.
- Kershaw, Ian (2000). The Nazi Dictatorship: Problems and Perspectives of Interpretation (4th ed.). London: Edward Arnold. ISBN 0-340-76028-1. LCCN 2001265781. OCLC 237407240. OL 3962209M. Wikidata Q140480455.
- Marrus, Michael (2000). The Holocaust in History. Toronto: Key Porter Books. ISBN 1-55263-120-6. LCCN 99931498. OCLC 1302076985. OL 8568934M.
- Piper, Ernst [in German], ed. (1993). Forever in the Shadow of Hitler?: Original Documents of the Historikerstreit, the Controversy Concerning the Singularity of the Holocaust. Translated by James Knowlton; Truett Cates. Atlantic Highlands: Humanities Press. ISBN 0-391-03784-6. LCCN 92023763. OCLC 185745606. OL 1720524M. Wikidata Q140500166.
  - Winkler, Heinrich August (1993). "Eternally in the Shadow of Hitler? The Dispute about the Germans' Understanding of History". In Piper (1993), pp. 171–176.

== General references ==
- Fischer, Conan Review of German Foreign Policy from Bismarck to Adenauer: The Limits of Statecraft pages 347–348 from International Affairs, Volume 67, Issue #. 2, April 1991.
- Fox, John Review of Deutsche Aussenpolitik 1933–1945: Kalkul oder Dogma? pages 75–77 from International Affairs Volume 49, Issue # 1 January 1973.
- Gordon, Bertram Review of The Third Reich pages 473–474 from The History Teacher, Volume 19, Issue # 3, May 1986.
- Herzstein, Robert Review of German Foreign Policy from Bismarck to Adenauer: The Limits of Statecraft pages 582–584 from German Studies Review, Volume 13, Issue # 3 October 1990.
- Kelly, Reece C. Review of Das Dritte Reich pages 473–474 from German Studies Review, Volume 4, No. 3, October 1981.
- Kitchen, Martin Review of Vom Reich Zum Weltreich: Hitler, NSDAP und Koloniale Frage 1919–1945 pages 1743–1744 from The American Historical Review, Volume 75, No. 6, October 1970.
- Knox, MacGregor Review of Das Vergangene Reich: Deutsche Außbenpolitik von Bismarck bis Hitler, 1871–1945 pages 624–626 from The Journal of Modern History, Volume 69, Issue # 3 September 1997.
- Lee, Marshall Review of The Foreign Policy of the Third Reich page 432 from The American Historical Review, Volume 80, Issue # 2 April 1975.
- Marrus, Michael (1987). The Holocaust In History. Toronto: Lester & Orpen Dennys. ISBN 0-88619-155-6.
- Merson, A.L. Review of The Foreign Policy of the Third Reich pages 235–236 from The English Historical Review, Volume 90, Issue #. 354 January 1975.
- Michaelis, Meir Review of Vom Reich zum Weltreich: Hitler, NSDAP und koloniale Frage 1919–1945 pages 748–749 from International Affairs, Volume 46, No. 4, October 1970.
- Milward, Alan Review of Internationale Beziehungen in der Weltwirtschaftskrise 1929–1933 page 929 from The English Historical Review, Volume 98, Issue # 389 October 1983.
- Norling, Bernard "German Unity" Review of The Foreign Policy of the Third Reich & The Anschluss Question in the Weimar Era: A Study of Nationalism in Germany and Austria, 1918–1932 by Stanley Suval pages 247–251 from The Review of Politics, Volume 37, Issue # 2 April 1975.
- Robbins, Keith Review of Internationale Beziehungen in der Weltwirtschaftskrise 1929–1933 pages 1034–1035 from The English Historical Review, Volume 101, Issue # 401 October 1986.
- Robbins, Keith Review of 1939 An der Schwelle zum Weltkrieg Die Entfesselung des Zweiten Weltkrieges und das internationale System pages 805–806 from The English Historical Review, Volume 109, Issue # 432 June 1994.
- Roche, Mark Review of The Third Reich pages 509–511 from The German Quarterly, Volume 59, Issue #. 3 Summer, 1986.
- Schroeder, Paul Review of Das Vergangene Reich: Deutsche Aussenpolitik von Bismarck bis Hitler 1871- 1945 pages 145–147 from The American Historical Review, Volume 101, No. 1, February 1996
- Schwartz, Thomas Alan Review of German Foreign Policy from Bismarck to Adenauer: The Limits of Statecraft pages 201–204 from The Journal of Modern History, Volume 66, Issue # 1 March 1994.
- Taylor, A.J.P. Review of Vom Reich zum Weltreich pages 878–879 from The English Historical Review, Volume 85, Issue # 337 October 1970.
- Wahl, Thomas Review of Die Bundesrepublik Deutschland und Frankreich: Dokumente 1949–1963, vol. 3, Parteien, Öffentlichkeit, Kultur page 159 from Vingtième Siècle. Revue d'histoire, Number. 64, October- December 1999.
- Waldman, Eric Review of The Foreign Policy of the Third Reich pages 202–204 from Annals of the American Academy of Political and Social Science, Volume 413, May 1974.
- Wynot, Jr, Edward Review of The Foreign Policy of the Third Reich page 887–890 from Political Science Quarterly, Volume 89, Issue # 4, Winter 1974–1975.
