= Historiography of Germany =

The historiography of Germany deals with the manner in which historians have depicted, analyzed and debated the history of Germany. It also covers the popular memory of critical historical events, ideas and leaders, as well as the depiction of those events in museums, monuments, reenactments, pageants and historic sites, and the editing of historical documents.

== Medieval and early modern ==
Diarium Europaeum was a journal on the history of the German-speaking lands founded by Martin Meyer (Philemerus Irenicus Elisius) and published between 1659 and 1683 in 45 volumes.

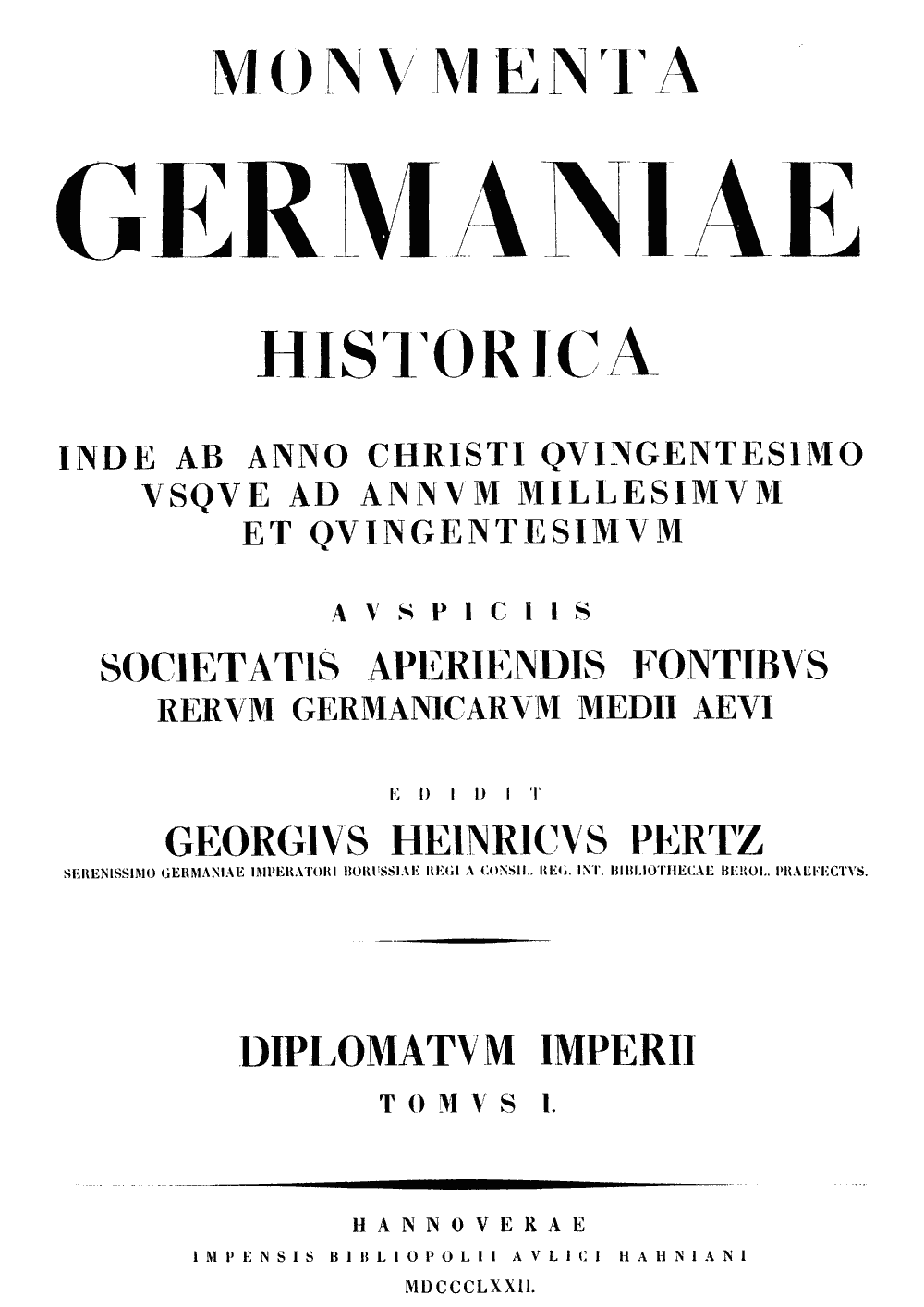
Monumenta Germaniae Historica

Very precise editing of historic documents was a main concern in the 19th century, as exemplified by Monumenta Germaniae Historica. It published many thousands of documents, both chronicle and archival, for the study of German history (broadly conceived) from the end of the Roman Empire to 1500. The MGH was founded in Hanover in 1819. The first volume appeared in 1826. The editor from 1826 was Georg Heinrich Pertz (1795 to 1876); in 1875 he was succeeded by Georg Waitz (1813–1886) . Many eminent medievalists participated in the project, searching for and annotating documents.

The Die Deutschen Inschriften project begun in 1934 collects and redacts medieval and early modern inscriptions in Germany.

Justus Möser (1720-1794) was a German jurist best known for his innovative history of Osnabrück (1768) which stressed social and cultural themes.

== 19th century ==
=== Hegel and Marx ===
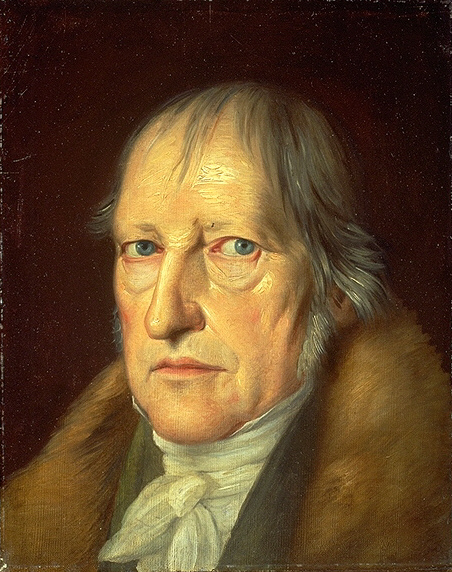
Georg Wilhelm Friedrich Hegel introduced the Hegelian dialectic.

Another important German thinker was Georg Wilhelm Friedrich Hegel, whose theory of historical progress ran counter to Ranke's approach. In Hegel's own words, his philosophical theory of "World history... represents the development of the spirit's consciousness of its own freedom and of the consequent realization of this freedom." This realization is seen by studying the various cultures that have developed over the millennia, and trying to understand the way that freedom has worked itself out through them:

Hegel's main historical enterprise was to study the emergence of the idea of freedom. Starting with China and India, which gave a very limited scope to freedom, he moves to ancient Persia and Greece, which had much more sophisticated views, and then to Rome, which added a policy of rule by law. Christianity added a positive spirit to the Roman idea of freedom, but during the Middle Ages, according to Hegel, tight Church control led to stagnation. The breakthrough for freedom came during the Renaissance, and especially during the Reformation. Hegel concludes that the constitutional monarchy of the Germanic and Scandinavian states, and Britain, represents so far the highest stage of freedom. He dismisses democracy as a step backward. He uses a three-stage approach: the status quo is the "thesis", the challenge to it (as represented by Socrates, Christianity, and Luther) is the "antithesis" with the outcome being a synthesis at a higher stage of development of freedom.

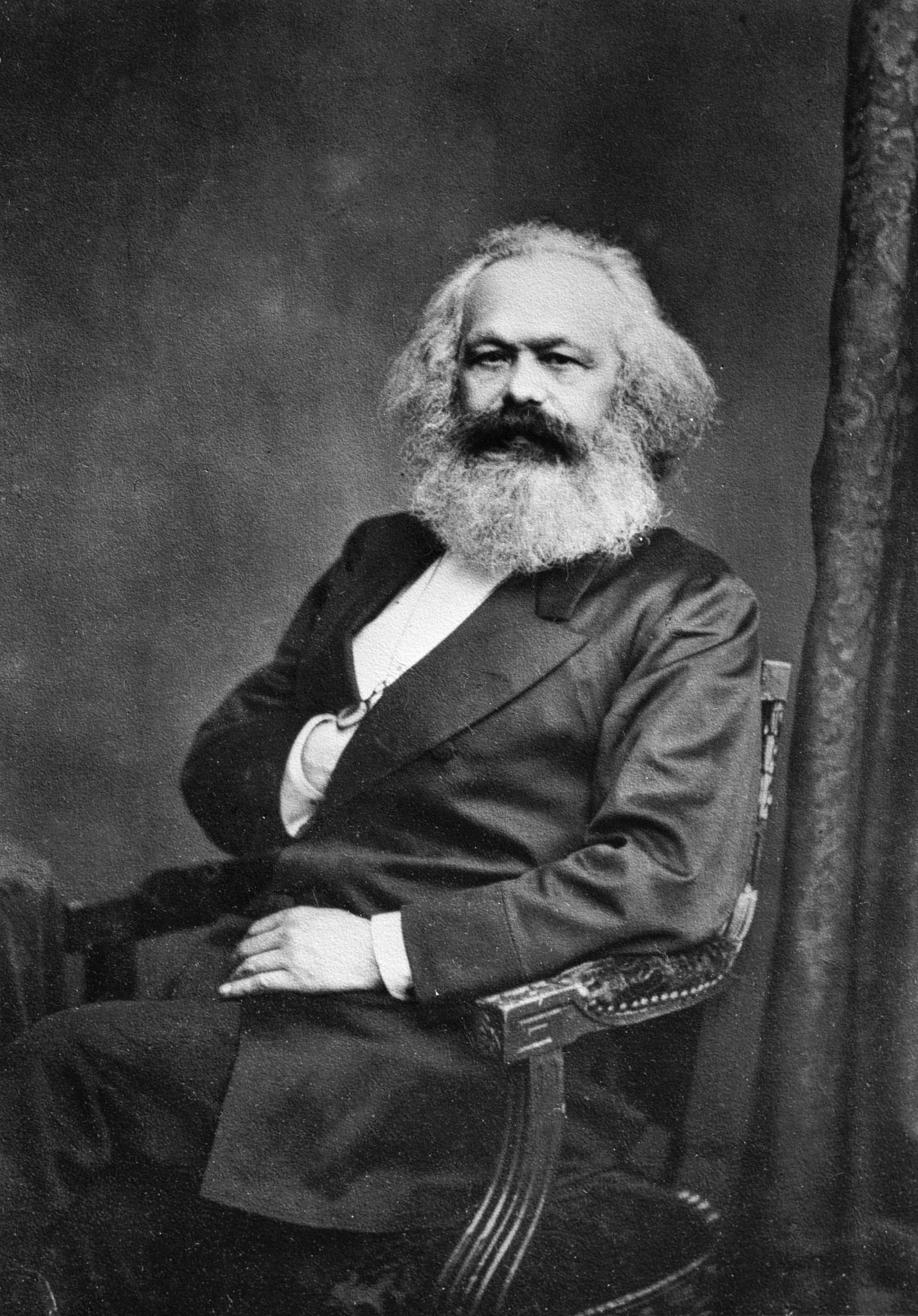
Karl Marx built upon Hegelian thought to develop historical materialism.

Karl Marx followed the Hegelian dialectic method, but inverting it to make material factors (especially economic factors) superior to virtual forces. Marx introduced the concept of historical materialism into the study of world historical development. In his conception, the economic conditions and dominant modes of production determined the structure of society at that point. In his view five successive stages in the development of material conditions would occur in Western Europe. The first stage was primitive communism where property was shared and there was no concept of "leadership". This progressed to a slave society where the idea of class emerged and the State developed. Feudalism was characterized by an aristocracy working in partnership with a Church and the emergence of the nation state. Capitalism appeared after the bourgeois revolution when the capitalists (or their merchant predecessors) overthrew the feudal system and established a market economy, with private property and parliamentary democracy. Marx then predicted the eventual proletarian revolution that would result in the attainment of socialism, followed by Communism, where property would be communally owned.

=== Niebuhr ===
Barthold Georg Niebuhr (1776–1831) became Germany's leading historian of Ancient Rome and a founding father of modern scholarly historiography. By 1810 Niebuhr was inspiring German patriotism in students at the University of Berlin by his analysis of Roman economy and government. Niebuhr was a leader of the Romantic Era and symbol of German national spirit that emerged after the humiliating defeat of the German Army by Napoleon at Jena in 1806. He was also deeply rooted in the classical spirit of the Age of Enlightenment in his intellectual presuppositions, his use of philological analysis, and his emphasis on both general and particular phenomena in history. He emphasized use of the techniques that philologists had used to study ancient documents, stressing that historical research had to be based primarily on primary sources.

=== Leopold von Ranke ===
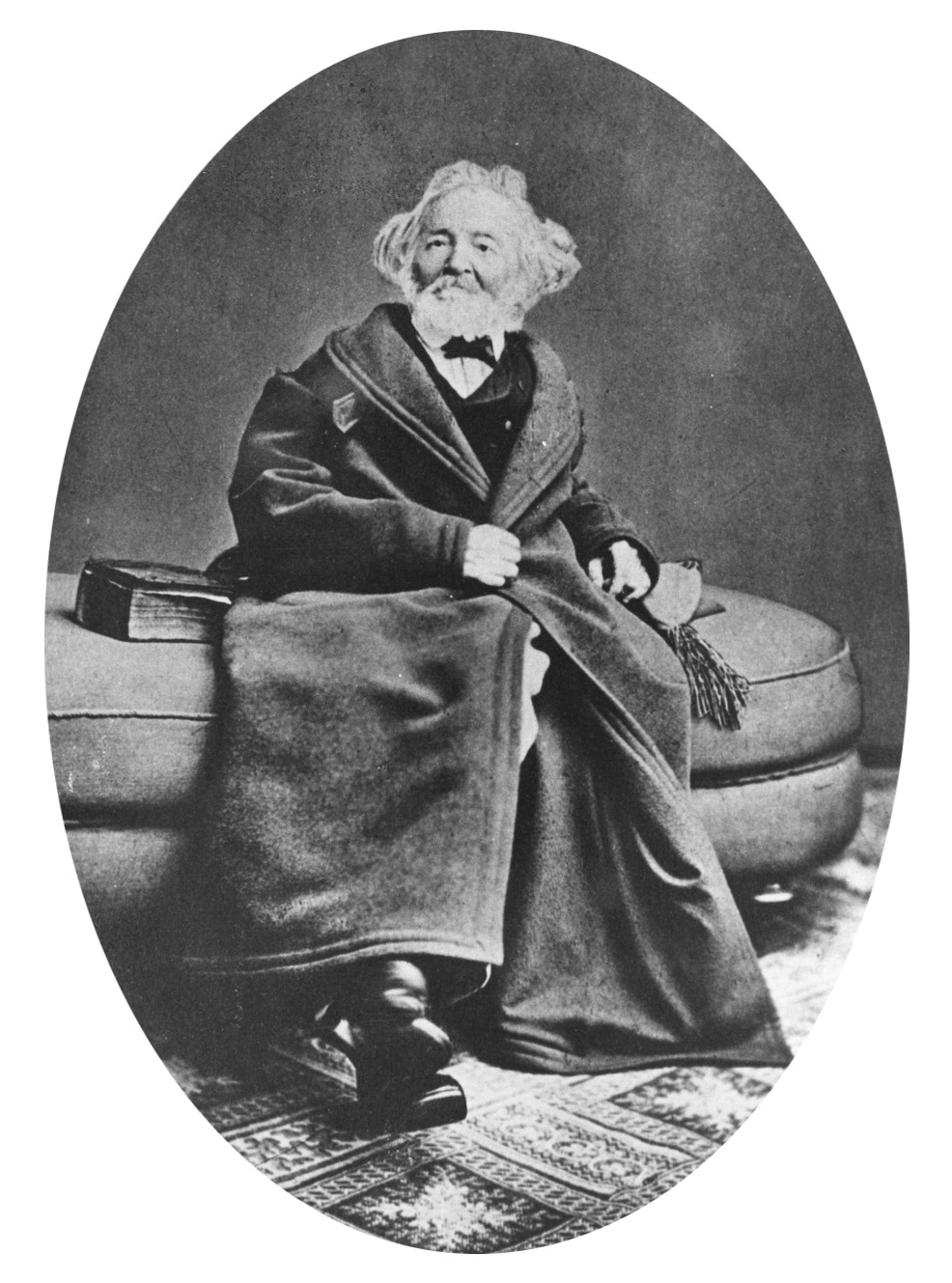
Leopold von Ranke (1795-1886) established modern methods history in history at his seminar in Berlin.

The modern academic study of history and methods of historiography were pioneered in 19th-century German universities, especially the University of Berlin and the University of Göttingen. Leopold von Ranke (1795-1886) at Berlin was the pivotal influence in this regard, and was the founder of modern source-based history. According to Caroline Hoefferle, "Ranke was probably the most important historian to shape historical profession as it emerged in Europe and the United States in the late 19th century."

Specifically, he implemented the seminar teaching method in his classroom, and focused on archival research and analysis of historical documents. Beginning with his first book in 1824, the History of the Latin and Teutonic Peoples from 1494 to 1514, Ranke used an unusually wide variety of sources for a historian of the age, including "memoirs, diaries, personal and formal missives, government documents, diplomatic dispatches and first-hand accounts of eye-witnesses". Over a career that spanned much of the century, Ranke set the standards for much of later historical writing, introducing such ideas as reliance on primary sources, an emphasis on narrative history and especially international politics (aussenpolitik). Sources had to be solid, not speculations and rationalizations. His credo was to write history the way it was. He insisted on primary sources with proven authenticity.

Ranke also rejected the 'teleological approach' to history, which traditionally viewed each period as inferior to the period which follows. In Ranke's view, the historian had to understand a period on its own terms, and seek to find only the general ideas which animated every period of history. In 1831 and at the behest of the Prussian government, Ranke founded and edited the first historical journal in the world, called Historisch-Politische Zeitschrift.

=== Nationalism ===
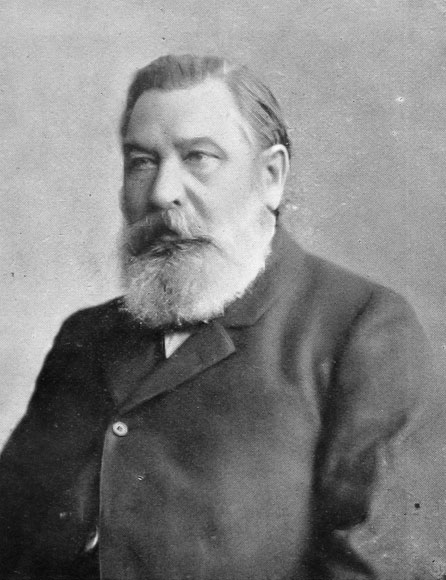
Heinrich von Treitschke became one of the most important German historians in the fin de siècle, and became an important figure in German nationalism and German antisemitism.

Across Europe, the nationalization of history took place in the 19th century, as part of national revivals in the 19th century. Historians emphasize the cultural, linguistic, religious and ethnic roots of the nation, leading to a strong support for their own government on the part of many ethnic groups, especially the Germans and Italians. It had a profound impact on Germany, providing strong widespread intellectual support for the unification achieved in 1870-71. An especially influential German historian was Heinrich von Treitschke (1834-1896).

=== Other historians ===
Johann Gustav Droysen (1808–1884) moved from his original interest in Rome to the history of Prussia, He was perhaps most influential for his consideration of the nature of historiography, making a strong case for the autonomy of history regardless of the growing prestige of the sciences.

Karl Lamprecht (1856–1915) was the most controversial historian in Germany around 1900. His great goal was to fashion an all-embracing, scientific cultural history of the German nation, challenged the Rankean policies that had become governing tenets of German historiography.

Wilhelm Dilthey (1833–1911) was a historian, psychologist, sociologist, and philosopher, who held Hegel's Chair in Philosophy at the University of Berlin. Is best known for his philosophy of history, whereby he distinguished the humanities from the physical sciences. A lifelong concern was to establish a proper theoretical and methodological foundation for the "human sciences" (e.g. history, law, literary criticism), distinct from, but equally "scientific" as, the "natural sciences" (e.g. physics, chemistry). He suggested that all human experience divides naturally into two parts: that of the surrounding natural world, in which "objective necessity" rules, and that of inner experience, characterized by sovereignty of the will, personal responsibility for one's actions, an ability to subject everything to reasoning and to protect one's own autonomy. Historians used his approach to rebuff arguments that history was not fully "scientific."

In religious history, Adolf von Harnack (1851–1930) and Ernst Troeltsch (1865–1923) were highly influential well beyond Germany. Harnack's history of early Christianity gave a liberal Protestant interpretation. Troeltsch's explored the sociology of Christian believers, which he based on the sociology of Max Weber.

== Sonderweg ==
A major historiographical debate about the German history concerns the Sonderweg, the alleged "special path" that separated German history from the normal course of historical development, and whether or not Nazi Germany was the inevitable result of the Sonderweg. Proponents of the Sonderweg theory such as Fritz Fischer point to such events of the Revolution of 1848, the authoritarianism of the Second Empire and the continuation of the Imperial elite into the Weimar and Nazi periods. Opponents such as Gerhard Ritter of the Sonderweg theory argue that proponents of the theory are guilty of seeking selective examples, and there was much contingency and chance in German history. In addition, there was much debate within the supporters of the Sonderweg concept as for the reasons for the Sonderweg, and whether or not the Sonderweg ended in 1945. Was there a Sonderweg? Winkler says:

For a long time, educated Germans answered it in the positive, initially by laying claim to a special German mission, then, after the collapse of 1945, by criticizing Germany's deviation from the West. Today, the negative view is predominant. Germany did not, according to the now prevailing opinion, differ from the great European nations to an extent that would justify speaking of a 'unique German path.' And, in any case, no country on earth ever took what can be described as the 'normal path.'

== Debate on World War I ==
Fritz Fischer (1908–1999) was best known for his analysis of the causes of World War I. In the early 1960s Fischer published Germany's Aims in the First World War, in which he put forward the controversial thesis that responsibility for the outbreak of the war rested solely with Imperial Germany. That set off a long debate among historians of Europe and Germany that continues into the 21st century. He has been described by The Encyclopedia of Historians and Historical Writing as the most important German historian of the 20th century.

Fischer argued that Germany had a policy of deliberately provoking war during July 1914 and that during the war Germany developed a set of annexationist war aims similar to those of Adolf Hitler during the Second World War. On publication, the book caused controversy in West Germany as it challenged the view that Hitler was an aberration by emphasizing the continuity in German foreign policy in 1914 and 1939. The book was also controversial for challenging the established view that Germany did not bear the primary responsibility for outbreak of the war, the so-called "war guilt lie". Fischer also claimed that German elites had wanted war since as early as 1902.

Historian John Moses stated in his 1975 work The Politics of Illusion that "No serious German historian today can venture to pit himself against the evidence compiled by the Fischer school." Fischer inspired several disciples, including the historian Imanuel Geiss. However, Fischer was ridiculed by conservative German historians who created a backlash against his ideas. The most notable critic was conservative historian and patriot Gerhard Ritter. Fischer's ideas were welcomed by historians in communist East Germany where Fritz Klein considered Fischer's views to be uncontroversial.

=== Prominent historians ===
Oswald Spengler (1880–1936) published The Decline of the West (Der Untergang des Abendlandes), in two volumes in 1918 and 1922, covering all of world history. The book was widely translated and carried the pessimistic implication that Western Civilization was now in irreversible decline, a timely theme in the aftermath of the horrors of the Great War. It had an enormous impact on intellectuals across the world in the 1920s, but its unusually broad sweeping interpretations of all of past history had little direct influence on the scholarship of working historians in Germany.

== Bielefeld School of social history ==
The Bielefeld School is a group of German historians based originally at Bielefeld University who promote social history and political history using quantification and the methods of political science and sociology. The leaders include Hans-Ulrich Wehler, Jürgen Kocka and Reinhart Koselleck. Instead of emphasizing the personalities of great leaders history, as in the conventional approach, it concentrates on socio-cultural developments. History as "historical social science" (as Wehler described it) has mainly been explored in the context of studies of German society in the nineteenth and twentieth centuries. The movement has published the scholarly journal Geschichte und Gesellschaft: Zeitschrift fur Historische Sozialwissenschaft since 1975.

Social history developed within West German historiography during the 1950s-60s as the successor to the national history discredited by National Socialism. The German brand of "history of society" — Gesellschaftsgeschichte — has been known from its beginning in the 1960s for its application of sociological and political modernization theories to German history. Modernization theory was presented by Wehler and his Bielefeld School as the way to transform "traditional" German history, that is, national political history, centered on a few "great men," into an integrated and comparative history of German society encompassing societal structures outside politics. Wehler drew upon the modernization theory of Max Weber, with concepts also from Marx, Otto Hintze, Gustav Schmoller, Werner Sombart and Thorstein Veblen.

== Historikerstreit and Nazi Germany ==
The Historikerstreit ("historians' quarrel") was an intellectual and political controversy in the late 1980s in West Germany about the crimes of Nazi Germany, including their comparability with the crimes of the Soviet Union.

The Historikerstreit pitted right-wing against left-wing intellectuals. The positions taken by the right-wing intellectuals were largely based on the totalitarianism approach which takes a comparative approach to totalitarian states, while left-wing intellectuals argued that fascism was uniquely evil, referred to as the Sonderweg approach, and could not be equated with the crimes of Soviet communism. The former were accused by their critics of downplaying Nazi crimes, while the latter were accused by their critics of downplaying Soviet crimes. The debate attracted much media attention in West Germany, with its participants' frequently giving television interviews and writing op-ed pieces in newspapers. It flared up again briefly in 2000 when one of its leading figures, Ernst Nolte, was awarded the Konrad Adenauer Prize for science.

== Prominent scholars ==
=== Past scholars in Germany ===
- Johann Gustav Droysen (1808–1884)
- Johann Gottlieb Fichte (1762–1814)
- Johann Gottfried Herder (1744–1803)
- Karl Lamprecht (1856–1945)
- Gottfried Leibniz (1646–1716)
- Karl Marx (1818–1883)
- Justus Möser (1720–1794)
- Samuel von Pufendorf (1632–1694)
- Leopold von Ranke (1795–1886)
- Beatus Rhenanus (also known as Beatus Bild) (1485–1547)
- Friedrich Carl von Savigny (1779–1861)
  - German Historical School
- Heinrich von Sybel (1817–1895)
- Heinrich von Treitschke (1834–1896)

=== 20th-21st century scholars in Germany ===
- Martin Broszat – Nazi era
- Werner Conze
- Fritz Fischer (1908–1999) – World War I
- Klaus Hildebrand (born 1941)
- Andreas Hillgruber (1925–1989)
- Eberhard Jäckel – Nazi era
- Jürgen Kocka – Bielefeld school; social history
- Hartmut Kaelble
- Friedrich Meinecke (1862–1954)
- Hans Mommsen
- Wolfgang Mommsen
- Thomas Nipperdey (1927–1992) – 1800 to 1918
- Ernst Nolte, (born 1923)
- Detlev Peukert
- Gerhard Ritter
- Hans Rothfels – military
- Oswald Spengler (1880 – 1936) – world history
- Michael Stürmer − 20c; geography
- Klemens von Klemperer – Nazi era
- Hans-Ulrich Wehler – Bielefeld School; new social history; 19c
- Michael Wolffsohn
- Rainer Zitelmann – Nazi era

=== Historians outside Germany ===
- Thomas Carlyle (1795–1881) – Frederick the Great
- Alan Bullock – Hitler
- Gordon A. Craig – Army, politics
- Richard J. Evans – Nazi era (in The Third Reich Trilogy: The Coming of the Third Reich, The Third Reich in Power, and The Third Reich at War)
- Ian Kershaw – Hitler
- Claudia Koonz – Women in Nazi era
- Timothy Mason – Nazis
- George Mosse – 19c-20c culture
- Steven Ozment – Reformation
- Fritz Stern – cultural
- Henry Ashby Turner – 20c esp business

=== Holocaust historians ===
- Yehuda Bauer
- Martin Broszat
- Christopher Browning
- Lucy Dawidowicz
- Norman Finkelstein
- Henry Friedlander
- Saul Friedländer
- Daniel Goldhagen
- Raul Hilberg
- Peter Longerich
- Michael Marrus
- Hans Mommsen
- R. J. Rummel
- Doris Bergen

== See also ==
- Historiography of Adolf Hitler
- Historiography of World War I
- Historiography of World War II
