= Europaeum (disambiguation) =

Europaeum is an organisation of ten leading European universities.

Europaeum may also refer to:

- EUROPAEUM Institute for European Policy
- Institutum Europaeum, a Belgian think tank

== See also ==
- Diarium Europaeum, a journal on the history of the German-speaking lands published between 1659 and 1683
- Theatrum Europaeum, a journal on the history of the German-speaking lands published between 1633 and 1738
- European (disambiguation)
