= Nazi foreign policy debate =

Aspect of the history of Nazi Germany

The foreign policy and war aims of the Nazis have been the subject of debate among historians. The Nazis governed Germany between 1933 and 1945. There has been disagreement over whether Adolf Hitler aimed solely at European expansion and domination, or whether he planned for a long-term global empire.

== Continentalists vs. Globalists ==
=== Moltman and Hillgruber ===
The argument for what these aims meant in literal terms originates from the 1960s by historians Gunter Moltman and Andreas Hillgruber who, in their respective works, claim that it was Hitler's dream to create "Eutopia" and eventually challenge the United States. This thesis puts these two historians in the "Globalists" category, with opposition labelled "Continentalists". Evidence for these claims comes from Germany's preparation for war in the years 1933–39 with increased interest in naval building, and Hitler's decision to declare war on the United States after the attack on Pearl Harbor, which shows Hitler's determination. The Globalists use this as an argument for how Hitler's ideology was shaped; i.e., the US could only be defeated if Germany conquered Europe and allied with Britain. It is said with general agreement that this viewpoint expressed by Hitler was written with the mindset that the US was of little interest to Germany, and did not pose a threat to her existence. However, noted through speeches and recorded conversations, after 1930, Hitler viewed the United States as a "mongrel state", incapable of unleashing war and competing economically with Germany due to the extreme effects of the Great Depression. Even in the late 1930s, as Continentalists argue against world conquest, Hitler seems to still disregard US power in the world, and believes that only through German-American citizens can the US revive and prosper. This may shed light as to why Hitler made the decision to declare war on the US after Pearl Harbor, and continued to focus on European expansion in the late 1930s.

However, while Hildebrand believes Hitler had a carefully premeditated Stufenplan (step-by-step) for Lebensraum, Hillgruber claims he intended intercontinental conquest afterwards. Likewise, Noakes and Pridham believe that taking Mein Kampf and the Zweites Buch together, Hitler had a five-stage plan: rearming and remilitarizing the Rhineland; establishing Austria, Czechoslovakia, and Poland as German satellites; defeating France or neutralizing her through a British alliance; establishing Lebensraum in Russia; and finally establishing world domination. Goda agreed, believing that Hitler's ultimate aim was the defeat and overthrow of the United States, against whose threat he would guarantee the British Empire in return for a free hand to pursue Lebensraum in the East. Hitler had long-term plans for French North Africa and in 1941 began to prepare a base for a transatlantic attack on the United States. Donald Cameron Watt, who in 1990 believed that Hitler had no long-term plans, now agrees with Goda and believes that Hitler refused to make concessions to Spanish and Italian leaders Francisco Franco and Benito Mussolini in order to conciliate a defeated France so that such preparations could proceed.

=== Jochen Thies ===
There are other arguments for the case of the Globalists. Jochen Thies has been noted to say that plans for world domination can be seen in Hitler's ideology of displaying power. The creation of magnificent buildings and the use of propaganda to demonstrate German strength, along with the message to create a Reich to last a thousand years, clearly show Hitler's aspirations for the future. In this argument, these messages are a result of Nazi ideology intent on creating followers and boosting morale with a 'global character' to its wars. There is no doubt that Hitler dreamed about the future of his homeland and, in preparations for war, must have thought about the consequences of victory over the Soviet Union. His struggle, as he would reference in his book Mein Kampf, would and eventually did take on a global character, as he found his country fighting wars on many fronts across the world. The Globalist mindset for Hitler's foreign policy can be supported by the spiraling events of World War II, along with his second book.

=== Fritz Fischer ===
Fritz Fischer, a Continentalist historian who has done extensive work on German history, claims in his book From Kaiserreich to Third Reich that Nazi foreign policy was just a continuous trend from Otto von Bismarck's imperialistic policies and that Hitler wanted an empire to protect German interests at a time of economic instability and pressure from competing global empires.

== Other views ==
=== Martin Broszat ===
Martin Broszat, a functionalist historian, has been noted many times to point towards an ideological foreign policy fueled by antisemitism, anticommunism, and Lebensraum. He says that Hitler acted towards these three ideals to inspire popularity in his regime and to carry on the amazing transformation he ignited upon coming to power. In relation to foreign policy, this meant the destruction of the Treaty of Versailles and the reuniting of German territories lost after World War I, along with the eradication of Jews and communists around the world. He provides evidence with preparations made in 1938 to take land in the East of Europe, which fits in with the ideology of colonization, economic independence, and the creation of the Third Reich. Broszat offers a Continentalist case in declaring that Hitler was still dreaming of Eutopia when he did not include Poland in his plans before 1939 and focused upon Czechoslovakia and Austria instead, more easily attainable territories. Broszat argues against world conquest in this respect and notes that the escalating ideological radicalism of the Nazis' antisemitic views prevented them from being able to launch a truly serious attempt to take over the world. Germany found itself unwillingly in a world war, not a European one.

=== A. J. P. Taylor ===
In 1961, A. J. P. Taylor produced a book entitled The Origins of the Second World War, which paints a completely different picture of how Nazi foreign policy was shaped and executed. Taylor's thesis was that Hitler was not the demoniacal figure of popular imagination but in foreign affairs a normal German leader. He compared the foreign policy of the Weimar Republic to that of Hitler, both wanting the destruction of the Treaty of Versailles and wanting Germany's former territories back, although the Weimar Republic advocated more peaceful measures. His argument was that Hitler wished to make Germany the strongest power in Europe but he did not want or plan war. The outbreak of war in 1939 was an unfortunate accident caused by mistakes on everyone's part. In addition, Taylor portrayed Hitler as a grasping opportunist with no beliefs other than the pursuit of power and to rid himself of the Jewish question. He argued that Hitler did not possess any sort of long-term plan and his foreign policy was one of drift and seizing chances as they offered themselves. He assigns blame on the harsh restrictions of Versailles, which created animosity amongst Germans such that, when Hitler preached a greater Germany, the public believed his words and was readily accepting of his programs. Taylor's point on this debate sparked uproar and widespread rebuttal.

== See also ==
- Geopolitik
- Functionalism versus intentionalism
- Bottom-up approach of the Holocaust
- Auschwitz bombing debate
- Historiography of Germany
  - Historikerstreit
  - Sonderweg
  - Vergangenheitsbewältigung
  - Victim theory, a theory that Austria was a victim of Nazism following the Anschluss
