= Susanne Heim =

German political scientist and historian

Susanne Heim is a German political scientist and historian of National Socialism, the Holocaust and international refugee policy.

== Selected publications ==
=== English language ===
- Architects of annihilation: Auschwitz and the logic of destruction. 2003. (With Gotz Aly)

=== German language ===
- Deutsches Reich: 1938 – August 1939. Band 2 von: Götz Aly (Hrsg.): Die Verfolgung und Ermordung der europäischen Juden durch das nationalsozialistische Deutschland 1933–1945. R. Oldenbourg Verlag, München 2009, ISBN 978-3-486-58523-0. (Bearbeitung)
- Fluchtpunkt Karibik. Jüdische Emigranten in der Dominikanischen Republik. 1. Auflage, Ch. Links Verlag, Berlin 2009, ISBN 978-3-86153-551-5. (Mit: Hans Ulrich Dillmann)
- The Kaiser Wilhelm Society under national socialism. Cambridge University Press, New York City 2009, ISBN 978-0-521-87906-4. (Englisch; Herausgeberin)
- Kalorien, Kautschuk, Karrieren. Pflanzenzüchtung und landwirtschaftliche Forschung in Kaiser-Wilhelm-Instituten 1933 bis 1945. Band 5 von: Kaiser-Wilhelm-Gesellschaft zur Förderung der Wissenschaften: Geschichte der Kaiser-Wilhelm-Gesellschaft im Nationalsozialismus. Wallstein-Verlag, Göttingen 2003, ISBN 3-89244-696-2.
- Architects of annihilation. Auschwitz and the logic of destruction. Weidenfeld and Nicolson, London 2002, ISBN 0-297-84278-1: (Englisch; mit: Götz Aly)
- Autarkie und Ostexpansion. Pflanzenzucht und Agrarforschung im Nationalsozialismus. Band 2 von: Kaiser-Wilhelm-Gesellschaft zur Förderung der Wissenschaften: Geschichte der Kaiser-Wilhelm-Gesellschaft im Nationalsozialismus. Wallstein-Verlag, Göttingen 2002, ISBN 3-89244-496-X. (Herausgeberin)
- Berechnung und Beschwörung. Überbevölkerung – Kritik einer Debatte. Verlag der Buchläden Schwarze Risse / Rote Strasse, Berlin 1996, ISBN 3-924737-33-9. (Mit: Ulrike Schaz)
- Vordenker der Vernichtung. Auschwitz und die deutschen Pläne für eine neue europäische Ordnung. Durchgesehene Ausgabe, Fischer-Taschenbuch-Verlag, Frankfurt am Main 1993, ISBN 3-596-11268-0. (Mit: Götz Aly; Lizenzausgabe des Hoffmann-und-Campe-Verlags, Hamburg); erweiterte Neuausgabe Fischer Taschenbuch, Frankfurt/Main 2013, ISBN 978-3-596-19510-7
