= Helmut Krausnick =

German historian and author

- Born: 19 February 1905; Brunswick, German Empire
- Died: 22 January 1990 (aged 84); Stuttgart, West Germany
- Occupations: Historian, author, editor
- Awards: Order of Merit of the Federal Republic of Germany

Academic background
- Education: Friedrich Wilhelm University of Berlin

Academic work
- Era: 20th century
- Institutions: Institute of Contemporary History (Director, 1959–1972)
- Main interests: Modern European history, History of the Holocaust

Helmut Krausnick (19 February 1905 – 22 January 1990) was a German historian and writer. From 1959 to 1972, he was the head of the Institute of Contemporary History, a leading German research institute on the history of National Socialism.

Krausnick co-authored Die Truppe des Weltanschauungskrieges, the 1981 work on the mass murder of Jews in the occupied territories of the Soviet Union by the Einsatzgruppen, which was considered a milestone in Holocaust studies. It was also one of the first publications to challenge the myth of the "clean" Wehrmacht.

== Education and career ==
Helmut Krausnick was born in Wenden (Braunschweig), today a district of Brunswick in 1905, and grew up in Bad Harzburg in a middle-class family. He studied history and political science at the University of Breslau. In 1932 Krausnick joined the Nazi Party. He continued his academic studies at Heidelberg University and the Friedrich Wilhelm University of Berlin, where he received his doctorate in 1938. Subsequently, Krausnick worked at the National Archives; in 1940 he moved to the Archive Commission of the Foreign Office. From September 1944 to May 1945, he served in the Wehrmacht.

From 1948 Krausnick worked at the Internationale Schulbuchinstitut. In 1951 Krausnick joined the Institute of Contemporary History in Munich, headed by Hermann Mau. When the latter died in 1952, Krausnick completed Mau's work, German History, 1933–45: An Assessment by German Historians, which appeared in 1956 and was translated into many languages. In 1959 Krausnick was appointed director of the institute, remaining in the position until his retirement in 1972. In 1968, he was appointed an honorary professor of contemporary history at LMU Munich. Krausnick appeared as a court expert in Nazi trials. In 1980, he was awarded the Order of Merit of the Federal Republic of Germany. Krausnick died in 1990 in Stuttgart.

== Die Truppe des Weltanschauungskrieges ==
Krausnick co-authored Die Truppe des Weltanschauungskrieges ("Troops of an ideological crusade"), the 1981 work on the mass murder of Jews in the occupied areas of the Soviet Union by Einsatzgruppen units. The research completed by the authors shows that the Einsatzgruppen leaders were predominantly career policemen, some with law degrees, and sons of upper-middle class Germans, who compensated for failings in their studies or careers by joining the SS. Many had been pre-1933 Sturmabteilung (SA) "stormtroopers".

The book traces the beginnings of the Einsatzgruppen during the Anschluss of Austria in 1938 and then during the invasion of Poland in September 1939, where they engaged in the persecution of clergy, intellectuals, Polish nobility, and Jews. The invasion of the Soviet Union unleashed the genocidal murder of Jews and other civilians in the occupied territories by the Einsatzgruppen death squads. Reviewing the book for The Journal of Modern History, political scientist Peter H. Merkl calls it an "utterly absorbing, if grisly, reading for the non-specialists and systematic confirmation for historians specialising in the area".

The book is considered a milestone in Holocaust studies. Historian Peter Longerich describes the work as a "seminal academic study", which made Krausnick the leading figure in the Holocaust functionalism versus intentionalism debate. Krausnick was an "intentionalist" who posited that Hitler had made the decision to kill European Jews in the spring of 1941, in the run-up to Operation Barbarossa.

== Demolishes myth of clean Wehrmacht ==
Krausnick conducted research on the Commissar Order and other criminal orders and their implementation by the German armed forces. Die Truppe des Weltanschauungskrieges was one of the first works to challenge the legend of a "clean" or "innocent" Wehrmacht, which had depicted the German armed forces as free of blame for the crimes committed. The book provided evidence of what the authors described as the "terrifying integration of the army into Hitler's extermination program and extermination policy".

Their research refuted the notions that the Wehrmacht generals did not know about or would have opposed the activities of the Einsatzgruppen. The book provides an example of the November 1941 Orsha Conference organised by Franz Halder, chief of the German General Staff, to discuss the course of the Battle of Moscow. At the conference, the generals said unanimously that the activities of the Einsatzgruppen were "worth their price in gold" for the fighting troops because they ensured security in the rear of their armies. The German historian Norbert Frei notes:

Apart from the actual history of the persecution of the Jews and the ignored role of the judicial system as an instrument of terror, the most scandalous example certainly was the outrageous disregard of the Wehrmacht's participation in the murder of Jews in Eastern Europe, although this had already been established as fact by the Nuremberg Trials and remained lodged in historical consciousness outside of Germany. Within Germany, however, from the start of the 1950s, military circles (the so-called soldatische Kreise) were so effective in suppressing this information that it was not until the early 1980s that historiographers could begin to expose their involvement, which even at that stage was still met with storms of protest.

== Selected works ==
=== In English ===
- German History, 1933–45: An Assessment by German Historians, London 1978, with Hermann Mau.
- Anatomy of the SS State, New York 1968, with Martin Broszat, Hans Buchheim and Hans-Adolf Jacobsen

=== In German ===
- Hermann Mau, Helmut Krausnick: Deutsche Geschichte der jüngsten Vergangenheit 1933–45. Wunderlich, Tübingen 1956.
- Helmut Krausnick: Judenverfolgung. In: Anatomie des SS-Staates, Band 2. Olten, Freiburg i.Br. 1965.
- Helmut Krausnick, Harold C. Deutsch (Eds.): Helmuth Groscurth. Tagebücher eines Abwehroffiziers. Deutsche Verlagsanstalt, Stuttgart 1970.
- Helmut Krausnick, Hans-Heinrich Wilhelm: Die Truppe des Weltanschauungskrieges. Die Einsatzgruppen der Sicherheitspolizei und des SD 1938–1942. Deutsche Verlags-Anstalt, Stuttgart 1981. Reissued in 1985 as Hitlers Einsatzgruppen. Die Truppen des Weltanschauungskrieges, Frankfurt am Main, Fischer Verlag.
