= Götz Aly =

German journalist, historian and social scientist (born 1947)

Götz Aly at the Frankfurt Book Fair 2025

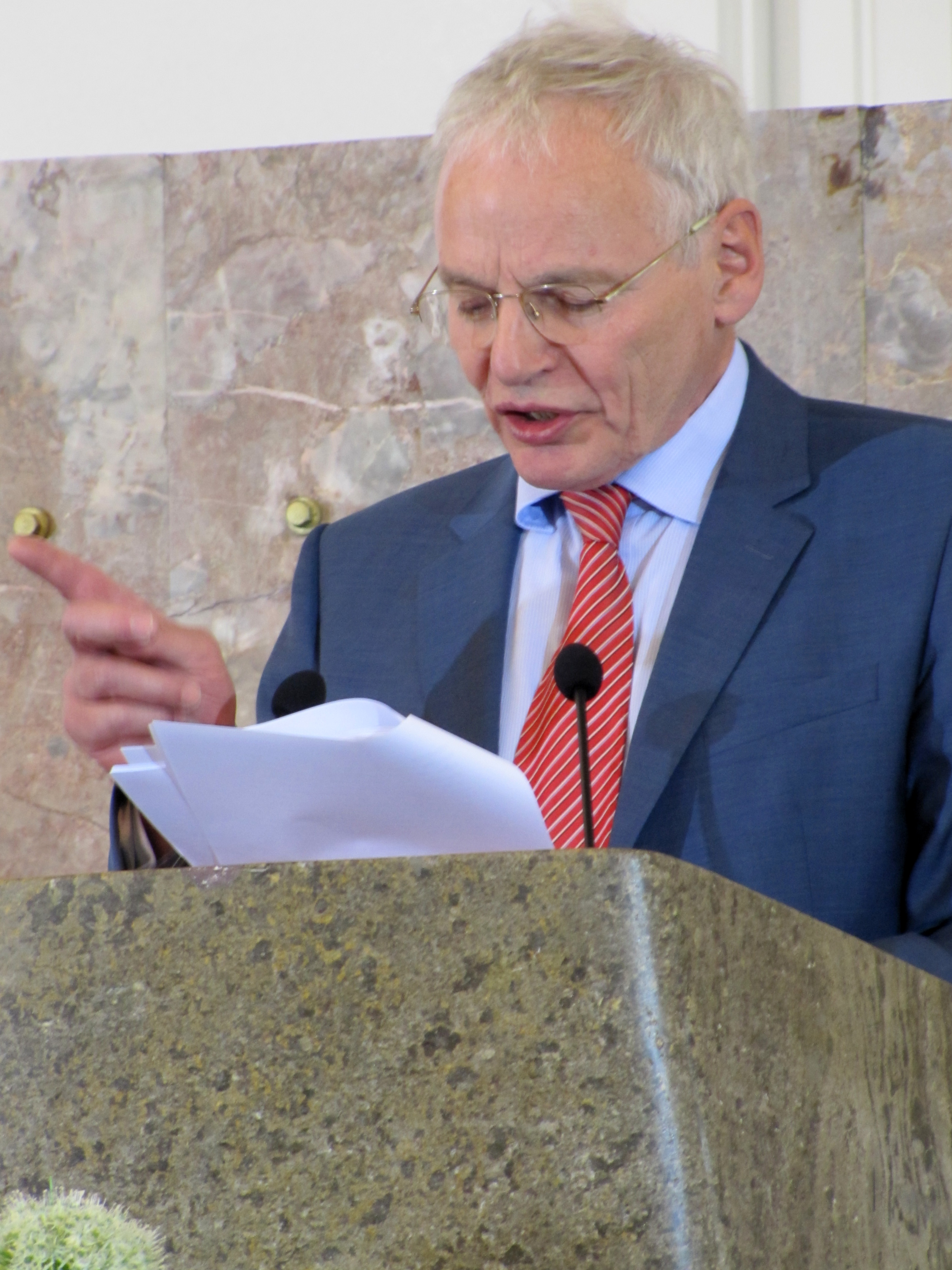
Aly in 2012

Götz Haydar Aly (German: [ˈɡœts ˈʔaːliː]; born 3 May 1947) is a German journalist, historian and political scientist.

== Life and career ==
Aly was born in Heidelberg of Baden-Württemberg to Ernst and Ottilie Aly. His father was a Hitler Youth functionary who later became a businessman. Aly's distinctive surname is derived from his patrilineal descent from Friedrich Christian (Haydar) Aly, an Ottoman captive who converted to Christianity and became a chamberlain at the Prussian court in the late 1600s. By family tradition, the oldest son gets the middle name 'Haydar'.

After attending the Deutsche Journalistenschule, Aly studied history and political science in Berlin. As a journalist, he worked for the taz, the Berliner Zeitung and the FAZ. Active in the leftist German student movement in the late 60s and early 70s, he published in 2009 the polemic retrospective book Unser Kampf 1968: Ein irritierter Blick zurück (Our Struggle 1968: An Irritated Look Back), at S. Fischer Verlag, in which he argues that the radical, leftist students of the time had more in common with the "1933 generation" than they realized.

He obtained his Habilitation in political science at the Free University of Berlin in 1994 with a dissertation on the Nazi practice of euthanasia of disabled children.

From 2004 to 2005, he was a visiting professor for interdisciplinary Holocaust research at the Fritz Bauer Institut in Frankfurt am Main, and from 2012–13 at the Institute for Contemporary History at the University of Vienna. He has also been a visiting researcher at Yad Vashem.

== Work ==
Aly's main area of study has been the history of the Holocaust and the parties involved in formulating destructive Nazi policies. In his 1999 book "Final Solution": Nazi Population Policy and the Murder of the European Jews, he argues that Germans of lower rank influenced Nazi leadership to implement the Final Solution. This argument is known as the bottom-up approach of the Holocaust. For his work, Aly was awarded the Heinrich-Mann-Preis in 2002 and the Marion-Samuel-Preis one year later.

In 2005, he gained widespread attention in Germany for the popular success of his book Hitlers Volksstaat (Hitler's People's State, translated in English as Hitler's Beneficiaries). In it, Aly characterises Nazi Germany as a "convenience dictatorship" that until late in World War II retained broad public support by enabling an unprecedented social mobility for the lower classes, by introducing redistributive fiscal policies, and by greatly extending the German welfare state. Aly describes how all this was paid for in large part by confiscation of Jewish property in Germany, and later by looting conquered countries, especially their Jewish populations. He maintains that the reason for the enthusiastic support enjoyed by the Nazi regime was not so much a consequence of its violent anti-Semitism, but rather by appeasing Germans with the fruits of the plunder acquired in Nazi-occupied territories. Aly shows how the Wehrmacht was directly involved in this mass plunder and how in many cases it was the initiator of policies which led to confiscation and eventual extermination. Moreover, he asserts that Germany's leading bankers and other members of the conservative, non-Nazi financial state bureaucracy were instrumental in formulating this policy of plunder and murder.

His views have not remained without criticism from the mainstream of historical research. Adam Tooze, in particular, rejected Aly's argumentation in detailed analysis published in the German press. Economic historian Marc Buggeln compared Germany to other countries in order to check Aly's contention in Hitler's Beneficiaries that the Nazis enacted a progressive tax policy, summarized as "tax breaks for the masses" and "tax rigor for the bourgeoisie". Buggeln found that Nazi Germany actually had a less progressive tax policy than countries such as the United Kingdom and United States.

In his review of Hitler's Beneficiaries, British historian Richard J. Evans cited what he called "a fundamental weakness" in Aly's approach:

[H]e has applied a kind of economic reductionism that leaves other factors too much out of account—notably ideology and belief. His arguments are always stimulating and deserve the closest consideration, but they by no means tell the whole story, and they considerably exaggerate the impact of material factors on Nazi decision-making, which was fundamentally irrational at its core.

== Publications ==
For an extensive list of Aly's publications and related web links in German, please refer to the German version of this article.

In English:

- co-written with Peter Chroust & Christian Pross: Cleansing the Fatherland: Nazi Medicine and Racial Hygiene, Baltimore: Johns Hopkins University Press, 1994.
- "Final Solution": Nazi Population Policy and the Murder of the European Jews, London: Arnold; New York: Oxford University Press, 1999.
- co-written with Susanne Heim: Architects of Annihilation: Auschwitz and the Logic of Destruction, Princeton, NJ: Princeton University Press, 2002
- co-written with Karl Heinz Roth: The Nazi Census: Identification and Control in the Third Reich, Philadelphia: Temple University Press, 2004.
- Hitlers Volksstaat. Raub, Rassenkrieg und nationaler Sozialismus, Fischer, Frankfurt am Main, 2005. ISBN 3-10-000420-5.
- translated by Jefferson Chase from the German Hitlers Volksstaat (see above): Hitler's Beneficiaries: Plunder, Racial War, and the Nazi Welfare State, New York: Henry Holt and Company, 2005.
- Hitler's Beneficiaries: Plunder, Racial War, and the Nazi Welfare State, Metropolitan Books. January 2007. ISBN 0-8050-7926-2, ISBN 978-0-8050-7926-5.
- Why the Germans? Why the Jews? Envy, Race Hatred, and the Prehistory of the Holocaust, Metropolitan Books, April 2014. ISBN 978-0-8050-9700-9.
- Europe Against the Jews, 1880–1945, Metropolitan Books, April 2020, ISBN 978-1-250-17017-0

== Awards ==
- 2002: Heinrich-Mann-Preis
- 2003: Marion-Samuel-Preis
- 2007: National Jewish Book Award in the Holocaust category for Hitler's Beneficiaries: Plunder, Racial War, and the Nazi Welfare State
- 2018: Geschwister-Scholl-Preis for Europa gegen die Juden, 1880–1945
