= Hans Mommsen =

German historian (1930–2015)

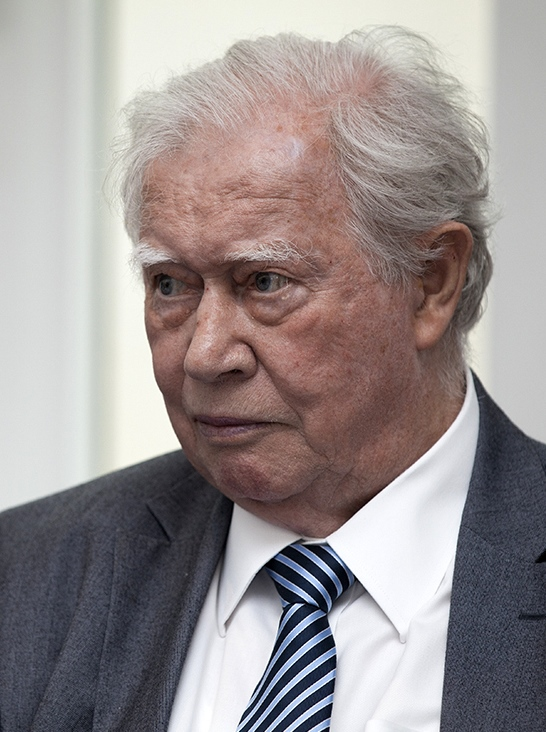
- Mommsen in 2013
- Born: 5 November 1930; Marburg, Weimar Germany
- Died: 5 November 2015 (aged 85); Tutzing, Germany
- Occupation: Historian
- Known for: Studies in German social history

Hans Mommsen (5 November 1930 – 5 November 2015) was a German historian, known for his studies in German social history, for his functionalist interpretation of the Third Reich, and especially for arguing that Adolf Hitler was a weak dictator. Descended from Nobel Prize-winning historian Theodor Mommsen, he was a member of the Social Democratic Party of Germany.

== Life and career ==
Mommsen was born in Marburg, the child of the historian Wilhelm Mommsen and great-grandson of the historian of Rome Theodor Mommsen. He was the twin brother of historian Wolfgang Mommsen. He studied German, history and philosophy at the University of Heidelberg, the University of Tübingen and the University of Marburg. Mommsen served as professor at Tübingen (1960–1961), Heidelberg (1963–1968) and at the University of Bochum (since 1968). He married Margaretha Reindel in 1966. He was a member of the Social Democratic Party of Germany from 1960 until his death. He died on 5 November 2015, his 85th birthday.

=== Early work ===
Much of Mommsen's early work concerned the history of the German working class, both as an object of study itself and as a factor in the larger German society. Mommsen's 1979 book, Arbeiterbewegung und nationale Frage ("The Labour Movement and the National Question"), a collection of his essays written in the 1960s–70s was the conclusion of his studies in German working class history.

=== Functionalism and the "weak dictator" thesis ===
Mommsen was a leading expert on Nazi Germany and the Holocaust. He was a functionalist in regard to the origins of the Holocaust, seeing the Final Solution as a result of the "cumulative radicalization" of the German state as opposed to a long-term plan on the part of Adolf Hitler.

Mommsen is best known for arguing that Hitler was a "weak dictator" who rather than acting decisively, reacted to various social pressures. Mommsen believed that the model of a totalitarian state used to characterize Nazism contradicted historical evidence and rejected totalitarianism as a concept of historiography and political science in general. Together with his friend Martin Broszat, Mommsen developed the structuralist interpretation of the Third Reich, that saw the Nazi state as a chaotic collection of rival bureaucracies engaged in endless power struggles.

In regards to the debate about foreign policy, Mommsen argued that German foreign policy did not follow a "programme" during the Nazi era, but was instead "expansion without object" as the foreign policy of the Reich driven by powerful internal forces sought expansion in all directions.

Mommsen faced criticism in the following areas:

- Intentionalist historians such as Andreas Hillgruber, Eberhard Jäckel, Klaus Hildebrand and Karl Dietrich Bracher have criticized Mommsen for underestimating the importance of Hitler and Nazi ideology. The Swiss historian Walter Hofer accused Mommsen of "not seeing because he does not want to see" what Hofer saw as the obvious connection between what Hitler wrote in Mein Kampf and his later actions.
- Along the same lines, these historians criticized Mommsen for focusing too much on initiatives coming from below in the ranks of the German bureaucracy and not enough on initiatives coming from above in the leadership in Berlin.
- Mommsen's friend Yehuda Bauer has criticized Mommsen for stressing too much the similarities in values between the traditional German state bureaucracy and the Nazi Party's bureaucracy while paying insufficient attention to the differences.

=== The Historikerstreit ===
In the Historikerstreit debate about how to incorporate the Holocaust into German historiography, Mommsen argued that the Holocaust and fascist crimes could not be downplayed by being equated with Soviet crimes. Mommsen argued that the growth in pacifist feeling in the Federal Republic as reflected in widespread public opposition to the American raid on Libya in April 1986 made it imperative for the Americans and the West German government to promote a more nationalistic version of German history, and this was what was behind the Historikerstreit.

=== Other historical work ===
Mommsen wrote highly regarded books and essays on the fall of the Weimar Republic, blaming the downfall of the Republic on German conservatives. Like his brother Wolfgang, Mommsen was a champion of the Sonderweg (Special Path) interpretation of German history that sees the ways German society, culture, and politics developed in the 19th century as having made the emergence of Nazi Germany in the 20th century virtually inevitable.

Another area of interest for Mommsen was dissent, opposition, and resistance in the Third Reich. Much of Mommsen's work in this area concerns the problems of "resistance without the people". Mommsen drew unfavorable comparisons between what he saw as conservative opposition and Social Democratic and Communist resistance to the Nazis. Mommsen was an expert on social history and often wrote about working-class life in the Weimar and Nazi eras.

Starting in the 1960s, Mommsen was one of a younger generation of West German historians who provide a more critical assessment of Widerstand within German elites, and came to decry the "monumentalization" typical of German historical writing about Widerstand in the 1950s. In two articles published in 1966, Mommsen proved as false the claim often advanced in the 1950s that the ideas behind "men of July 20" were the inspiration for the 1949 Basic Law of the Federal Republic.

=== The "Goldhagen Controversy" ===
During the "Goldhagen Controversy" of 1996, Mommsen emerged as one of Daniel Goldhagen's leading opponents, and often debated Goldhagen on German TV. Mommsen's friend, the British historian Sir Ian Kershaw, wrote he thought that Mommsen had "destroyed" Goldhagen during their debates over Goldhagen's book Hitler's Willing Executioners.

=== Later work ===
A major figure in Germany, Mommsen often took stands on the great issues of the day, believing that the responsibility for ensuring the mistakes of the past are never repeated rests upon an engaged and historically-conscious citizenry. Mommsen saw it as the duty of the historian to constantly critique contemporary society.

== Works ==
- Die Sozialdemokratie und die Nationalitätenfrage im habsburgischen Vielvölkerstaat ("Social Democracy and the Nationalities Question in the Multi-Ethnic Hapbsburg Empire"), 1963.
- "Der Reichstagsbrand und seine politischen Folgen," in Vierteljahrshefte fur Zeitgeschichte, Volume 12, 1964, pages 351–413, translated into English as "The Reichstag Fire and Its Political Consequences" pages 129–222 from Republic to Reich The Making of the Nazi Revolution edited by Hajo Holborn, New York: Pantheon Books, 1972, ISBN 0-394-47122-9.
- Beamtentum im Dritten Reich: Mit ausgewählten Quellen zur nationalsozialistischen Beamtenpolitik ("The Institution of the Civil Service in the Third Reich: With Selected Sources On National Socialist Civil Service Policy"), 1966.
- Industrielles System und politische Entwicklung in der Weimarer Republik ("Industrialism and Political Development of the Weimar Republic"), co-edited with Dietmar Petzina and Bernd Weisbrod, 1974.
- Sozialdemokratie zwische Klassenbewegung und Volkspartei ("Social Democracy Between Class Movement and Populist Party"), edited by Hans Mommsen, 1974.
- "National Socialism-Continuity and Change" pages 179–210 from Fascism: A Reader's Guide. Analyses, Interpretations, Bibliography edited by Walter Laqueur, Berkeley: University of California Press, 1976, ISBN 0-520-03033-8.
- Arbeiterbewegung und Industrieller Wandel: Studien zu Gewerkschaftlichen Organisationsproblemen im Reich und an der Ruhr ("Labor Movement and Industrial Change: Problems in Union Organizing in the Reich and the Ruhr"), edited by Hans Mommsen, 1978.
- Klassenkampf oder Mitbestimmung: Zum Problem der Kontrolle wirtschaftlicher Macht in der Weimarer Republik ("Class Struggle or Co-Determination: Issues in Controlling Economic Influence in the Weimar Republic"), 1978.
- Arbeiterbewegung und Nationale Frage: Ausgewählte Aufsätze ("The Labor Movement and the National Question: Selected Essays"), 1979.
- Glück Auf, Kameraden! Die Bergarbeiter und ihre Organisationen in Deutschland ("Good Luck, Comrades! Miners and Their Organizations in Germany"), co-edited with Ulrich Borsdorf, 1979.
- Vom Elend der Handarbeit: Probleme historischer Unterschichtenforschung ("Concerning the Misery of Piece-Work: Problems in Conducting Historical Research about the Underclass"), co-edited with Winfried Schulze, 1981.
- Politik und Gesellschaft im alten und neuen Österreich: Festschrift für Rodolf Neck zum 60. Geburtstag ("Politics and Society in the Old and New Austria: Festschrift for Rudolf Neck on the Occasion of his 60th Birthday"), co-edited with Isabella Acker and Walter Hummelbergrer, 1981.
- Auf der Suche nach historischer Normalität: Beiträge zum Geschichtsbildstreit in der Bundesrepublik ("In Search of Historical Normalcy"), 1987.
- Herrschaftsalltag im Dritten Reich: Studien und Texte ("Everyday Rule in the Third Reich: Studies and Texts"), co-edited with Susanne Willems, 1988.
- Die verspielte Freiheit: Der Weg der Republik von Weimar in den Untergang, 1918 bis 1933, 1989; translated into English by Elborg Forster & Larry Eugene Jones as The Rise And Fall Of Weimar Democracy, Chapel Hill : University of North Carolina Press, 1996, ISBN 0-8078-2249-3.
- "Reappraisal and Repression The Third Reich In West German Historical Consciousness" pages 173–184 from Reworking the Past edited by Peter Baldwin, Beacon Press: Boston, 1990, ISBN 0-8070-4302-8.
- Der Nationalsozialismus und die deutsche Gesellschaft, 1991; translated by Philip O'Connor into English as From Weimar to Auschwitz, Princeton, N.J. : Princeton University Press, 1991, ISBN 0-691-03198-3 .
- "The German Resistance against Hitler and the Restoration of Politics," Journal of Modern History Vol. 64, December 1992.
- "The Search for the 'Lost History' Observations on the Historical Self-Evidence of the Federal Republic" pages 101–113 and "The New Historical Consciousness and the Relativizing of National Socialism" pages 114–124 from Forever In The Shadow of Hitler? edited by Ernst Piper, Humanities Press, Atlantic Highlands, 1993, ISBN 0-391-03784-6.
- "Reflections on the Position of Hitler and Göring in the Third Reich" pages 86–97 from Reevaluating the Third Reich edited by Jane Caplan and Thomas Childers, New York, 1993, ISBN 0-8419-1178-9.
- Der Nationalsozialismus: Studien zur Ideologie und Herrschaft ("Studies in National Socialist Ideology and Rule"), co-edited with Wolfgang Benz and Hans Buchheim, 1993.
- Ungleiche Nachbarn: Demokratische und Nationale Emanzipation bei Deutsche, Tschechen und Slowaken (1815–1914) ("Unequal Neighbours: Democratic and National Emancipation of the Germans, Czechs, and Slovaks, 1815–1914") co-edited with Jiřǐ Kořalka, 1993.
- "Adolf Hitler und der 9. November 1923" (Adolf Hitler and 9 November 1923) from Der 9. November: Fünf Essays zur deutschen Geschichte, 1994.
- Widerstand und politische Kultur in Deutschland und Österreich ("Resistance and Political Culture in Germany and Austria"), 1994.
- "Der Antisemitismus war eine notwendige, aber keineswegs hinreichende Bedingung für den Holocaust" in Die Zeit, Nr. 36, 30 August 1996, translated into English as "Conditions for Carrying Out the Holocaust: Comments on Daniel Goldhagen's Book" pages 31–43 from Hyping the Holocaust: Scholars Answer Goldhagen edited by Franklin Littell, East Rockaway, NY: Cummings & Hathaway, 1997, ISBN 0-943025-98-2
- Der Erste Weltkrieg und die europäische Nachkriegsordnung: Sozialer Wandel und Formveränderung der Politik ("World War I and the European Post-War Order: Social Change and Transformation of Politics"), ed. by Hans Mommsen, 2000.
- Alternative zu Hitler. Studien zur Geschichte des deutschen Widerstandes, 2000; translated into English by Angus McGeoch as Alternatives to Hitler : German Resistance under the Third Reich, Princeton: Princeton University Press, 2003, ISBN 0-691-11693-8.
- Von Weimar nach Auschwitz: Zur Geschichte Deutschlands in der Weltkriegsepoche ("From Weimar to Auschwitz: On the History of Germany in the World War Era"), 2001.
- The Third Reich Between Vision and Reality: New Perspectives on German History, 1918–1945, ed. by Hans Mommsen, 2001, ISBN 978-1-85973-254-0.
- Germans Against Hitler: The Stauffenberg Plot and Resistance Under the Third Reich, translated into English by Angus McGeoch, London: I. B. Tauris, 2009, ISBN 1-84511-852-9.
- Das NS-Regime und die Auslöschung des Judentums in Europa ("The Nazi Regime and the Extermination of the Jews in Europe"), Göttingen: Wallstein-Verlag, 2014, ISBN 978-3-8353-1395-8.

== See also ==
- List of Adolf Hitler books
