= Philippe Burrin =

Swiss historian (born 1952)

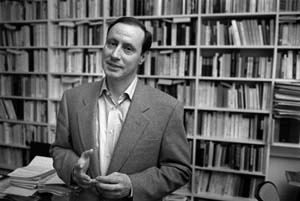
- Burrin in 1993
- Born: 16 March 1952 (age 74); Chamoson, Switzerland
- Occupation: Historian
- Known for: Studies on fascism, collaboration, antisemitism, and the Holocaust
- Title: Professor and former director, Geneva Graduate Institute
- Awards: François-Millepierres Prize (1990); Max-Planck Forschungspreis (1997)

Academic background
- Education: International relations (undergraduate)
- Alma mater: Graduate Institute of International Studies
- Thesis: (1985)
- Doctoral advisor: Saul Friedländer

Academic work
- Discipline: Historian
- Sub-discipline: Fascism, Holocaust studies, political ideologies
- Institutions: University of Geneva; Graduate Institute of International and Development Studies
- Main interests: Mass violence, fascism, collaborationism, antisemitism
- Notable works: La dérive fasciste, La France à l'heure allemande, Hitler et les Juifs
- Website: Graduate Institute profile

Philippe Burrin (born 16 March 1952) is a Swiss historian specialising in ideologies, political movements, and mass violence in 20th-century Europe, particularly during the interwar period and the Second World War. His work has contributed significantly to the study of fascism, collaboration, and genocide.

== Career ==
After earning an undergraduate degree in international relations (1975), he obtained his doctorate in political science (1985) at the Graduate Institute of International Studies in Geneva under the supervision of Saul Friedländer, a specialist in Nazi Germany.

Burrin was a professor in contemporary history (1982–1988) at the University of Geneva, before returning to the Geneva Graduate Institute first as assistant professor (1988–1993), and then professor of history of international relations. In 2004, he became director of the Geneva Graduate Institute, a position held until 2020.

In his book La dérive fasciste, Doriot, Déat, Bergery, 1933–1945, Burrin sought to trace the intellectual, political and ideological itinerary of Jacques Doriot, Marcel Déat and Gaston Bergery, left-wing French politicians whose views shifted from anti-fascism to embracing far-right movements and collaborating with the Vichy regime. In his analysis, Burrin points to the significance of France's social and political crisis during the interwar period, and seeks to demonstrate the process of the dissemination of fascism in France through this "fascistoid nebula". Indeed, if Déat, Doriot and Bergery borrowed elements from fascist ideology, the integral pacifism which united them (through the experience of the Great War) came up against the adoption of the ideology of territorial expansion specific to the fascism leading Burrin to speak of "deficit fascisms".

Burrin deepened this thesis in La France à l'heure allemande, 1940–1944 which analyzed how the French reacted and behaved during the German occupation and toward the occupier.

In Hitler and the Jews, Burrin offered a probable account of the sequence of events and Hitler's role in the decision to murder the Jews. Burrin is interested in forms of "accommodation" with the occupier, which he articulates by looking at the behavior of public figures and politicians, the clergy, employers, intellectuals, artists and collaborators.

Burrin is one of a handful of French scholars thought to have made a "decisive contribution" to the understanding of fascism and of the Shoah.

Alongside his research, Burrin is involved in several projects driven by a concern for the "duty of memory". Thus, he assisted in designing the information center of the Mahnmal Holocaust Memorial in Berlin (2001). He was also a member of the Historical Commission of the Foundation for the Memory of the Shoah of Paris. And he was a member of the Scientific Council for an International History of the Shoah.

Like Jean-Pierre Azéma, Henri Amouroux, Marc-Olivier Baruch, Jean Lacouture, Robert O. Paxton and René Rémond, Burrin testified as an expert at the trial of Maurice Papon in Bordeaux in 1997. During his intervention, he insisted on the knowledge of the French, before the war, of Nazi Germany's cruelty towards the Jews, particularly in Poland.

== Publications ==
- La Dérive fasciste. Points. Histoire (in French). Paris: Éditions du Seuil. 2015 [1986]. p. 585. ISBN 978-2-02-058923-9., [présentation en ligne], [présentation en ligne].
- Hitler et les Juifs. Genèse d’un génocide, Paris, Le Seuil, 1989, 200 p. (édition de poche, 1995). ISBN 2020108844, 2020234084
- La France à l'heure allemande, 1940–1944. L'univers historique (in French). Paris: Seuil. 1995. p. 559. ISBN 2-02-018322-6., [présentation en ligne].

Réédition : La France à l'heure allemande 1940-1944. Points. Histoire (in French). Paris: Seuil. 1997. p. 559. ISBN 2-02-031477-0..

- Fascisme, nazisme, autoritarisme, Paris, Le Seuil, 2000, 315 p. ISBN 2020414821
- Strands of Nazi Anti-sémitism, Oxford, Europaeum, 2004, 44 p.
- Ressentiment et apocalypse. Essai sur l’antisémitisme nazi, Paris, Le Seuil, 2004, 112 p. ISBN 2020632624

Traduction espagnole : Resentimiento y apocalipsis, Buenos Aires/Madrid, Katz editores S.A., 2007. ISBN 8493543209

- 6 juin 44 (avec Jean-Pierre Azéma et Robert O. Paxton), Paris, Perrin, 2004, 207 p. ISBN 2262019819

== Awards ==
- François-Millepierres Award of the French Academy en 1990, for his book Hitler et les juifs. Genèse d’un génocide.
- Max-Planck Forschungspreis Award en 1997.
