= Cumulative radicalization =

Concept in genocide studies

In historiography and genocide studies, cumulative radicalization is the notion that genocide and other mass crimes are not planned long in advance, but emerge from wartime crises and a process of radicalization. Originally coined by German historian Hans Mommsen with regard to the functionalist view of the Holocaust, in his 1976 essay "National Socialism: Cumulative Radicalization and the Regime's Self-Destruction". The concept has also been applied to the Armenian genocide.
