= Rolf-Heinz Höppner =

German SS officer, lawyer and war criminal

Rolf-Heinz Höppner (born 24 February 1910 in Siegmar (now part of Chemnitz); died 23 October 1998 in Bad Godesberg) was a German lawyer and SS-Obersturmbannführer in the Reich Security Main Office (RSHA), known for his involvement in the Holocaust.

== Career ==
Höppner studied law at Leipzig University and passed both state examinations. Initially, he worked on a voluntary basis for the press office of the Sicherheitsdienst (SD, "Security Service") and was hired as the head of the unit in early 1934. Later he was working on personnel and organizational matters and rose to become the head of the SD section in Posen, Warthegau in the occupied Poland.

Höppner was a member of the SS (SS No. 107.136) and the NSDAP (membership number 321.209). This membership number indicates that he became the member of the Nazi Party in 1931.

As head of the Central Resettlement Office in Posen, Höppner was responsible for the "resettlement of foreign ethnic groups", namely the deportation of Jews and Poles to the General Government, as well as the resettlement of ethnic Germans (Volksdeutsche) in the Warthegau. At the beginning of 1943, he became head of the "Gau Office for Ethnic Issues". In July 1944 Höppner - meanwhile promoted to SS-Obersturmbannführer - was ordered to Berlin to head the sub-department III A "Ethnic and Legal Issues" in the Reich Security Main Office.

== Involvement in the Holocaust ==
On 16 July 1941 Höppner sent a note to Adolf Eichmann, in which he had summarized "various meetings of the local administrators" on "solution of the Jewish question in the Reichsgau". His report stated that "There is the danger this winter, that the Jews can no longer all be fed. It is to be seriously considered whether the most humane solution might not be to finish off those Jews not capable of labor by some sort of fast-working preparation." Asking for Eichmann's opinion, Höppner concluded: "The things sound in part fantastic, but would in my view be quite capable of implementation." Some of the suggestions related to the establishment of a camp in which all 300,000 Jews from the Warthegau would be concentrated. Jews able to work would be pulled out as columns. All Jewish women of childbearing age would be sterilized.

A "fast-working preparation", mentioned in the Höppner note, namely gassing using carbon monoxide from steel bottles, had been used by a Sonderkommando under Herbert Lange since 1939 in the Warthegau to murder inmates of psychiatric institutions. The search for a place of extermination for Jews unable to work began in the Warthbrücken district in July 1941; by November 1941, nearly 4,000 Jews were shot by mobile commandos or suffocated in gas vans. In December 1941, the killings began in the Chelmno extermination camp.

On 3 September 1941 Höppner proposed in a 13-page letter to the RSHA to expand the work of the regional resettlement into a wider nationwide resettlement program. After the war ended, he believed the Soviet territory could offer adequate space for such deportations. However, he wanted first to clarify whether one should "ensure a continued living" of the "undesirable parts of the population" or whether "they should be completely eradicated".

Höppner was later among the witnesses of the first Posen speech of 4 October 1943, at which Heinrich Himmler spoke openly about the annihilation of the Jews, then under way in the Nazi-controlled territories.

== After the war ==
Höppner was arrested near Flensburg in July 1945. He appeared as a defense witness in the Nuremberg trial against the main war criminals to deny the responsibility of the Reich Security Main Office for the murders committed by the Einsatzgruppen of the Sicherheitspolizei ("Security Police") and the Sicherheitsdienst ("Security Service").

Höppner was extradited to Poland in 1947 and reportedly sentenced to death on 15 March 1949. According to other sources, Höppner was sentenced to life imprisonment in Poznan. After the big Polish amnesty started in October 1956, Höppner was released in early 1957, worked as a senior government councilor in the Ministry of Housing and later lived unmolested in a Cologne old people's home.
