= Diarium Europaeum =

- Discipline: History and current affairs
- Language: English

Publication details
- History: 1659–present

Standard abbreviations
- ISO 4: Diarium Eur.

Diarium Europaeum (Latin for 'Journal of Europe') was a journal of history and current affairs founded by Martin Meyer, who wrote under the name Philemerus Irenicus Elisius. It was published between 1659 and 1683 in 45 volumes, and later renamed Allgemeine Schau-Bühne der Welt (German for 'Theatre of the World'). Wilhelm Serlin served as publisher from the journal's inception until Serlin's death.

The journal focussed on contemporary events as opposed to chronicles of more distant times. Burke cites the Diarium as an example of the existence of the concept of 'Europe' in the 17th century.

== Sources ==
- Spalding, Keith (October 1952). "Notes on the Language of Wilhelm Serlin". The Modern Language Review. 47 (4): 529–546. doi:10.2307/3719704. JSTOR 3719704.
