= Michael Marrus =

Canadian historian

Michael Robert Marrus CM FRHistS FRSC (February 3, 1941 – December 23, 2022) was a Canadian historian of the Holocaust, modern European and Jewish history and international humanitarian law. He was the author of eight books on the Holocaust and related subjects.

== Education ==
He received his Bachelor of Arts (BA) degree at the University of Toronto in 1963. He then studied at the University of California, Berkeley, graduating with a Master of Arts (MA) degree in 1964 and a Doctor of Philosophy (PhD) degree in 1968. He also received a master's degree in law from the University of Toronto in 2005. Marrus was Professor of History and Dean of the School of Graduate Studies and served for nineteen years as Governor of the institution. He was a senior fellow of Massey College until 2017 and was the Chancellor Rose and Ray Wolfe Professor Emeritus of Holocaust studies.

== Career ==
=== Publications ===
In 1981 Marrus co-authored with Robert Paxton Vichy France and the Jews which demonstrated that the anti-semitism of Vichy France was endogenous to the region rather than imposed from without and that the Vichy government, which was spared occupation for a time, could sometimes be even more brutal than states which, unlike Vichy, were actually under Nazi occupation, especially in its role in organizing the deportation of Jews to death camps.

Among Marrus' best-known books, The Holocaust in History (1987) applies the tools of historiographic analysis to the vast literature on the topic, attempting to elucidate such issues as the problems of the uniqueness and universalism of the Holocaust; public opinion regarding the Jews in Nazi Europe; anti-semitism as a factor in the origins of the Holocaust; Jewish resistance; the role of the Judenräte; bystanders; and role of the churches in the Holocaust. He has also written on the history of European refugee movements in the twentieth century, and the Holocaust-era restitution campaign of the 1990s.

Marrus's Lessons of the Holocaust, published in 2015, deals with the historical and moral controversies which infuse the interpretation of the Holocaust and its significance. In it, Marrus denies there can be any definitive set of lessons to be learned from the destruction of the European Jews and instead affirms that there are many ever-evolving questions that need to be continually studied and re-interpreted. His works have been translated into French, German, Polish, Hebrew, Portuguese, and Japanese.

=== Role in historical investigative commission ===
In October 1999 Marrus was one of three Jewish scholars appointed to the International Catholic-Jewish Historical Commission to investigate the role of the Pope Pius XII during the Holocaust.

The commission was supposed to review and discuss the previously published Vatican records pertaining to the World War II period and report on their assessment. In October 2000 the commission issued a preliminary report with 47 questions about the Vatican's response to the Holocaust. Thereupon, in 2001, the Vatican rebuffed the commission's efforts to access Vatican archives of the Pontificate of Pius XII and the wartime period, and it subsequently disbanded amid controversy. In an interview in the Jerusalem Post Marrus expressed regret that the commission had run "up against a brick wall" on the question of opening Vatican archives.

== Massey College controversy ==
On September 26, 2017, at a lunch at Massey College, Hugh Segal, who then had the title of Master of Massey College, joined Marrus and other fellows at the table, including a black fellow. Marrus remarked, "You know this is your 'Master,' eh? Do you feel the lash?" Marrus apologized for the comment and resigned from his position as a Senior Fellow of the college on October 1, 2017, in a letter to Segal, the head of the college, stating his "deepest regrets to all whom I may have harmed." He added, "I am so sorry for what I said, in a poor effort at jocular humour... I want to assure those who heard me … that while I had no ill-intent whatsoever I can appreciate how those at the table and those who have learned about it could take offence at what I said."

== Personal life ==
Marrus was born in Toronto, Canada on February 3, 1941. In 1971, Marrus married Carol "Randi" Greenstein; the couple had three children.

He died on December 23, 2022, at the age of 81.

== Honors and awards ==
Marrus' books have received many prizes and distinctions, including the 1982 National Jewish Book Award in the Holocaust category for Vichy France and the Jews and more recently, a Canadian Jewish Literary Award for Lessons of the Holocaust. He has been a research fellow or has taught at St. Antony's College, Oxford, at Israel Institute for Advanced Studies at the Hebrew University of Jerusalem, at UCLA, and at the University of Cape Town, South Africa. He was a fellow of the Royal Society of Canada and the Royal Historical Society. In 2008 he became a member of the Order of Canada.

== Selected works ==
- Marrus, Michael R. (1977). "European Jewry and the Politics of Assimilation: Assessment and Reassessment". The Journal of Modern History. 49: 89–109. doi:10.1086/241541. S2CID 143795089.
- The Politics of Assimilation: The French Jewish Community at the Time of the Dreyfus Affair, 1971; second ed. 1980 (book publication of Ph.D. dissertation).
- Coauthored with Robert O. Paxton, Vichy France and the Jews, 1981.
- Marrus, Michael R.; Paxton, Robert O. (1982). "The Nazis and the Jews in Occupied Western Europe, 1940-1944". The Journal of Modern History. 54 (4): 687–714. doi:10.1086/244227. S2CID 144716937.
- The Unwanted: European Refugees in the 20th Century, 1985.
- The Holocaust in History, 1987.
- The Nazi Holocaust: Historical Articles on the Destruction of European Jews, 9 volumes, 1989. Editor.
- "Three Roads From Nuremberg"; Tablet magazine; Nov. 20, 2015.
- Samuel Bronfman: The Life and Times of Seagram's Mr. Sam, 1991.
- Marrus, Michael R. (1994). "Reflections on the Historiography of the Holocaust The Hedgehog and the Fox: An Essay on Tolstoy's View of History. Isiah Berlin". The Journal of Modern History. 66: 92–116. doi:10.1086/244779. S2CID 146939600.
- Lessons of the Holocaust. Foreword by Margaret MacMillan. University of Toronto Press, 2015.
