= Martin Broszat =

German historian (1926–1989)

- Born: 14 August 1926; Leipzig, Germany
- Died: 14 October 1989 (aged 63); Munich, West Germany
- Education: University of Leipzig (1946–1949); University of Cologne, PhD (1949–1952)
- Thesis: Die antisemitische Bewegung im Wilhelminischen Deutschland (1952)
- Occupation: Historian
- Employer: Institut für Zeitgeschichte (1955–1989)
- Known for: Study of Nazi Germany
- Notable work: Der Staat Hitlers (1969), published in English as The Hitler State (1981)

Martin Broszat (14 August 1926 – 14 October 1989) was a German historian specializing in modern German social history. As director of the Institut für Zeitgeschichte (Institute for Contemporary History) in Munich from 1972 until his death, he became known as one of the world's most eminent scholars of Nazi Germany.

Broszat joined the Institut für Zeitgeschichte in 1955 after obtaining his PhD from the University of Cologne. His work at the Institute included serving as an expert witness for the prosecution at the 1963–1965 Frankfurt Auschwitz Trials, and helping to debunk the forged Hitler Diaries in 1983. He also held an honorary professorship at the University of Konstanz.

According to Ian Kershaw, Broszat made important contributions in four areas. From the late 1950s, he worked on the history of Eastern Europe, especially Poland, and on Nazi concentration camps. This led to his exploration of the structure of the Nazi German state, which resulted in his book Der Staat Hitlers (1969), published in English as The Hitler State (1981). In the 1970s he became interested in Alltagsgeschichte and examined everyday life under the Nazis, developing the concept of "Resistenz" (immunity) and co-editing a six-volume work about Bavaria under National Socialism, Bayern in der NS-Zeit (1977–1983). In 1985, he began the debate about the historicization of Nazi Germany, arguing that it should be studied like any other period of history, without moralizing and with recognition of its complexity.

== Early life ==
=== Military service and studies ===
Born in Leipzig, Germany (the Weimar Republic), to a Protestant family, the second son of a postmaster, Broszat attended the Königin-Carola Gymnasium from 1937 and completed his Abitur there in 1944. Adolf Hitler had become Chancellor of Germany in January 1933, when Broszat was six, and World War II (1939–1945) had started when Germany invaded Poland in September 1939, and France and the United Kingdom declared war on Germany, as they had warned they would. After leaving school, Broszat enlisted and completed basic military training with the Wehrmacht (Stammkompanie des Panzergrenadier-Ersatzbataillons 108, Dresden), followed by officer training, then service at the front.

After the war, Broszat studied history at the University of Leipzig in the Soviet occupation zone, later East Germany, from 1946. He graduated in 1949, then undertook graduate studies at the University of Cologne. He obtained his PhD in 1952, supervised by Theodor Schieder, for a thesis on German antisemitism, Die antisemitische Bewegung im Wilhelminischen Deutschland ("The antisemitism movement in Germany during the Wilhelmine period").

=== Party membership ===
As a teenager, Broszat joined the Hitler Youth in Großdeuben (now part of Böhlen), at a time when membership was mandatory for "Aryans". In 1944 a membership card for the Nazi Party was issued for him. Broszat acknowledged having joined the Hitler Youth, but that a Nazi Party card existed in his name was first made public after his death. It is not known whether he applied to join the party, or whether the card was issued to him automatically as a Hitler Youth member who had come of age; at that point, members were admitted from age 17. His card (number 9994096) is one of ten million held by the German Bundesarchiv. When he applied to study at the University of Leipzig in 1946, he answered no to the question on the form: "Were you a member of the NSDAP?" By then, Leipzig had fallen under the control of the Soviet Union and had been annexed to East Germany. The historian Norbert Frei writes that making a false statement would have been risky, and concludes that Broszat probably did not know that a membership card had been issued in his name.

== Early career ==
=== Institut für Zeitgeschichte ===
After university, Broszat worked with Theodor Schieder on the eight-volume Dokumentation der Vertreibung der Deutschen aus Ost-Mitteleuropa (1954–1957), and in 1955 he joined the Institut für Zeitgeschichte in Munich. The Institute had been founded to study the Nazi era; the head of its advisory board at the time was Hans Rothfels, who also edited its journal, Vierteljahrshefte für Zeitgeschichte.

Initially Broszat's work focused on German Ostpolitik (policy in the east), and antisemitism and fascism in south-eastern and eastern Europe. During this period he wrote two books about German involvement in Poland, Nationalsozialistische Polenpolitik (1961), which examined the German occupation of Poland, and Zweihundert Jahre deutscher Polenpolitik (1963). The work won him accolades in Poland as one of the first German historians to offer an honest account of German–Polish relations.

A recurring interest for Broszat was why and how National Socialism had taken hold in Germany. "Broszat's driving incentive was to help an understanding of how Germany could sink into barbarity," Kershaw wrote. "That he himself had succumbed to the elan of the Nazi Movement was central to his motivation to elucidate for later generations how it could have happened." In his book Der Nationalsozialismus (1960), published in English as German National Socialism 1919–1945 (1966), Broszat examined Nazi ideology, which he regarded as incoherent. For Broszat, the constants were anti-communism, antisemitism and a perceived need for Lebensraum. In his view, these were a cloak for the essence of National Socialism: an intense desire to realize the "rebirth" of "the German nation", and irrational hatred of those considered Volksfeinde (enemies of the German people) and Volksfremde (those foreign to the German "race"). Broszat saw the primary supporters of the Nazis as the middle classes, who turned to Nazism to alleviate their anxieties about impoverishment and "proletarianization" in the wake of hyperinflation in the early 1920s and the mass unemployment that began with the Great Depression.

=== Letter about Dachau (1962) ===
In 1962 Broszat wrote a letter to the Die Zeit newspaper to "hammer home, once more, the persistently ignored or denied difference between concentration and extermination camps". The Germans had built concentration camps in Germany, but their six extermination camps—built for the purpose of gassing Jews—were in occupied Poland. (The death toll in the concentration camps was high nevertheless, from starvation, disease, beatings, and forced labour.) Holocaust deniers such as Paul Rassinier, Harry Elmer Barnes and David Hoggan made much of the fact in the 1960s that there had been no functioning gas chamber at the Dachau concentration camp in Germany. Broszat noted in the letter that a gas chamber was built there shortly before the end of the war to convert Dachau into a death camp, but it was never used. He argued that the confusion in the public's mind between concentration and death camps, and the tendency erroneously to describe Dachau as a death camp, was aiding the deniers.

=== Broszat–Wulf letters (1963) ===
When the German-Jewish historian Joseph Wulf accused a prominent German doctor, Wilhelm Hagen, a senior official in the West German Ministry of Health, of having helped to liquidate Jews in the Warsaw Ghetto, Broszat and other experts from the Institut für Zeitgeschichte tried to silence him during an exchange of letters in 1963. Hagen, who had worked during the war in the health department of the General Government area of German-occupied Poland, insisted he had done everything in his power to save the Jews of the Warsaw Ghetto and asked the Institut für Zeitgeschichte to support his version of events. Broszat wrote a letter to Wulf demanding that he retract his allegations against Hagen "in the interest of the tidiness of the historical document". Ian Kershaw wrote that the correspondence between Broszat and Wulf did not present Broszat in the best light. Broszat accepted Wulf's version of events only after Wulf produced a war-time memo written by Hagen urging that sick Jews "wandering around" be shot down.

=== Auschwitz trials; Anatomie des SS-Staates (1965) ===
At the 1963–1965 Frankfurt Auschwitz Trials, in which 20 of those involved with Auschwitz were prosecuted, Broszat and two other researchers from the Institut für Zeitgeschichte—Helmut Krausnick and Hans Buchheim—served as expert witnesses for the prosecution. Their 300-page report, "Nationalsozialistische Konzentrationslager", became the basis of their two-volume book (with Hans-Adolf Jacobsen), Anatomie des SS-Staates (1965), published in English as Anatomy of the SS State (1968). It was the first comprehensive study of Auschwitz and the SS.

== Functionalism ==
=== Der Staat Hitlers (1969) ===
In Der Staat Hitlers (The Hitler State) Broszat argued against characterizing Nazi Germany as a totalitarian regime and criticized Karl Dietrich Bracher and Ernst Nolte for advancing such a notion. With Hans Mommsen, Broszat developed a "structuralist" or "functionalist" interpretation of Nazi Germany, arguing in his 1969 book Der Staat Hitlers (The Hitler State) that the government had consisted of a welter of competing institutions and power struggles, and that this internal rivalry, not Adolf Hitler, had been the driving force behind the regime. In Broszat's view, Hitler had been a "weak dictator" (to use Mommsen's phrase) and the government of Nazi Germany a polycracy (rule by many), not a monocracy (rule by one). It was the chaos of the government that led to the collapse of the state and what Kershaw called the "accelerating progression into barbarism". Broszat wrote:

Because of the multiplicity of conflicting forces the Fuhrer's will (even when Hitler had something different in mind) was ultimately only able to influence events in this or that direction in an uncoordinated and abrupt fashion, and it was certainly not in a position to watch over and curb the new organizations, authorities and ambitions which developed as a result. The institutional and legal results of the intermittent orders and decrees of the Fuhrer became increasingly unfathomable and clashed with later authorizations granted by him.

That the Nazi state was a jumble of competing bureaucracies has been widely accepted by historians. The second element, that Hitler was a "weak dictator", is less accepted. The argument is that, although Hitler did not involve himself much in daily administration, this stemmed not from an inability to do so (as Broszat suggested), but from a lack of interest in the quotidian.

=== "Hitler and the Genesis of the 'Final Solution'" (1977) ===
In his essay "Hitler und die Genesis der 'Endlösung': Aus Anlaß der Thesen von David Irving" (1977), Broszat criticized the English author David Irving's argument in the latter's Hitler's War (1977) that Hitler had wanted to expel the Jews and make Europe judenfrei ("free of Jews") but had not known about the Holocaust until autumn 1943. The genocide of the Jews, Irving wrote, had been ordered by Heinrich Himmler and other senior Nazis. Broszat's essay was first published in the Vierteljahrshefte für Zeitgeschichte journal in 1977 and later in English as "Hitler and the Genesis of the 'Final Solution': An Assessment of David Irving's Theses".

Broszat did accept that there was no evidence of a written order from Hitler to enact the "Final Solution to the Jewish Question". When faced with the stalemate on the Eastern Front, the overwhelming of the European rail system by successive deportations of Jews to Poland, and the self-imposed "problem" of the three million Polish Jews the Germans had forced into ghettos, German officials in Poland had embarked on improvised killing schemes on their own initiative, he argued. The genocide of the Jews had developed "stück- und schubweise" ("bit by bit"), he wrote, because the Germans had led themselves into a "Sackgasse" ("blind alley").

Broszat's essay was the first account of the origins of the Holocaust by a respected historian in which responsibility for the genocide was not assigned entirely to Hitler. Christopher Browning wrote that, after Broszat's essay, "the floodgates opened", and the issue of when and whether Hitler had made a decision to kill the Jews became for a time the key issue of Holocaust historiography.

==== Criticism of David Irving ====
In the same essay, Broszat was extremely critical of Irving's handling of sources, accusing him of repeatedly seeking to distort the historical record in Hitler's favour. He complained that Irving focused too much on military events at the expense of the broader political context, and that he accepted Nazi claims at face value, such as accepting the claim that the Action T4 "euthanasia" program of the "incurably sick" began in September 1939 to free up hospital space for wounded German soldiers, when in fact it began in January 1939. Broszat criticized Irving's claim that one telephone note written by Himmler stating "No liquidation" with regard to a train convoy in November 1941 of German Jews passing through Berlin to Riga (whom the SS intended to have shot on arrival) was proof that Hitler did not want the Holocaust. Broszat argued that the "No liquidation" comment referred only to that train and was probably related to concerns that American reporters had been asking about the fate of German Jews deported to Eastern Europe.

Broszat criticized Irving for accepting the "fantastic" claims of the SS Obergruppenführer Karl Wolff that he did not know about the Holocaust (Irving's argument was that if Wolff did not know about it, how could Hitler?), despite the fact that Wolff was convicted of war crimes in 1963 on the basis of documentary evidence implicating him in the Holocaust. Broszat also accused Irving of seeking to generate a highly misleading impression of a conference between Hitler and the Hungarian Regent, Admiral Miklós Horthy, in April 1943 by re-arranging the words to make Hitler appear less brutally antisemitic than the original notes showed.

== Alltagsgeschichte and the Bavaria Project (1977–1983) ==
Broszat was a pioneer of Alltagsgeschichte (history of everyday life). He led the "Bavaria Project" between 1977 and 1983, a comprehensive look at Alltagsgeschichte in Bavaria between 1933 and 1945. The six-volume Bayern in der NS-Zeit ("Bavaria in the National Socialist Era") depicted actions such as refusal to give the Nazi salute as a form of resistance. The emphasis upon resistance in "everyday life" portrayed Widerstand (resistance) in shades of grey, noting that people who refused to behave as the Nazi regime wanted in one area often conformed in others. For example, the Bavarian peasants who did business with Jewish cattle dealers in the 1930s, despite the efforts of the Nazi regime to stop them, often expressed approval of the antisemitic laws.

Through his work on the Bavaria Project, Broszat formed the concept of Resistenz (immunity), which differs from resistance in the sense of Widerstand. Resistenz referred to the ability of institutions such as the Wehrmacht, the Roman Catholic Church and the bureaucracy to enjoy "immunity" from the Nazis' claims to total power, and to continue functioning according to their traditional values, without having to challenge the regime's political monopoly. Broszat used the Resistenz concept to advance the view that at the local level, there was much continuity in Germany between the Weimar and Nazi eras.

== Historicization of Nazi Germany ==
=== "A Plea for a Historicization of National Socialism" (1985) ===
In "A Plea for a Historicization of National Socialism", an essay published in Merkur in May 1985, Broszat argued that historians should approach Nazi Germany as they would any other period of history, without moralizing. Recommending an Alltagsgeschichte approach that would allow shades of gray by examining both the normality of everyday life and the barbarity of the regime, he wrote that "not all those historically significant developments which occurred in Germany during the Nazi period merely served the regime's goals of inhuman and dictatorial domination". Broszat used as an example the wide-ranging reform of the German social insurance system proposed in 1940 by the DAF, which he argued was in many ways the forerunner of the West German social insurance plan of 1957, with such features as pensions guaranteed by the state indexed to the level of GNP (which was not surprising given that many of the same people worked on both plans).

Broszat's "historicization" concept was criticized by the Israeli historian Omer Bartov, who accused Broszat of attempting to white-wash the German past and of trying to diminish Jewish suffering. Bartov argued that Broszat was calling on German historians to show more empathy for their own history. In Bartov's view, empathy was never lacking; rather, it was empathy for the victims that was lacking. Historians distanced themselves from the perpetrators, but they did not distance themselves from the German people, "the (often complicit) bystanders". Showing empathy for the victims would "block the option of empathy for oneself, creating thereby an unbearable psychological burden". Against this, the German historian Rainer Zitelmann suggested that Broszat's approach was a fruitful one, arguing that just as not everything was evil in the Soviet Union, not everything was evil in Nazi Germany, and that the Nazi regime had accomplished many successful social reforms. Several other scholars supported Broszat's arguments, including the American historian John Lukacs (who said the process of historization had, in fact, begun over 30 years ago), the German philosopher Jürgen Habermas, the German historian Hans Mommsen, and the British historian Richard J. Evans.

=== Historikerstreit ===
==== "Wo sich die Geister scheiden" (1986) ====
The Historikerstreit ("historians' dispute") of 1986–1988 was triggered by an article the German historian Ernst Nolte wrote for the conservative newspaper Frankfurter Allgemeine Zeitung (FAZ) in June 1986: "The past that will not pass". Rather than being studied as any other historical period would, Nolte wrote, the Nazi era hung over Germany like a sword. Comparing Auschwitz to the Gulag, he suggested that the Holocaust had been a response to Hitler's fear of the Soviet Union. Although parts of Nolte's argument sounded similar to Broszat's, Broszat strongly criticized Nolte's views in an essay entitled "Wo sich die Geister scheiden" ("Where the Roads Part") in October 1986, also in Die Zeit. He was particularly critical of an earlier claim of Nolte's that Chaim Weizmann, president of the Zionist Organization during World War II, had effectively declared war on Germany in 1939, on behalf of world Jewry. Broszat wrote that Weizmann's letter to Neville Chamberlain promising the support of the Jewish Agency against Hitler was not a "declaration of war", nor did Weizmann have the legal power to declare war on anyone: "These facts may be overlooked by a right-wing publicist with a dubious educational background but not by the college professor Ernst Nolte." He argued that Andreas Hillgruber had come close to being a Nazi apologist and that Nolte's arguments had, indeed (without any intention on his part), turned into apologetics. He ended his essay by arguing that, to ensure the German people a better future, they should not be persuaded to become less critical of their past.

==== Debate with Saul Friedländer ====
Broszat's call for the "historicization" of the Nazi era involved him in a vigorous debate with three Israeli historians in the latter half of the 1980s: Otto Dov Kulka, Dan Diner, and above all the Franco-Israeli historian Saul Friedländer. The debate between Broszat and Friedländer was conducted through a series of letters between 1987 until Broszat's death in 1989. In 1990 the Broszat-Friedländer correspondence was translated into English and published in Reworking the Past: Hitler, The Holocaust and the Historians' Debate, edited by Peter Baldwin.

== Personal life ==
Broszat married Alice Welter in 1953; the couple had three children.

== Selected works ==
- (1957). "Die Memeldeutschen Organisationen und der Nationalsozialismus". Vierteljahrshefte für Zeitgeschichte, 5(3), July, 273–278.
- (1960). "Die Anfänge der Berliner NSDAP, 1926/27". Vierteljahrshefte für Zeitgeschichte, 8, 85–118.
- (1960). Der Nationalsozialismus: Weltanschauung, Programmatik und Wirklichkeit. Hannover: Funke. OCLC 252075880
- (1961). Nationalsozialistische Polenpolitik, 1939–1945. Stuttgart: Deutsche Verlags-Anstalt. OCLC 903721883
- (1961). "Betrachtungen zu Hitlers Zweitem Buch". Vierteljahrshefte für Zeitgeschichte, 9, 417–430.
- with Ladislaus Hory (1964). Der kroatische Ustascha-Staat, 1941–1945. Stuttgart: Deutsche Verlags-Anstalt. OCLC 469813212
- (1966). German National Socialism, 1919–1945. English translation of Der Nationalsozialismus: Weltanschauung, Programmatik und Wirklichkeit. Translated by Kurt Rosenbaum & Inge Pauli Boehm, Santa Barbara, CA: Clio Press. ISBN 978-0874360516
- (1966). "Faschismus und Kollaboration in Ostmitteleuropa zwischen dem Weltkriegn". Vierteljahrshefte für Zeitgeschichte, 14(3), July, 225–251.
- (1968). "Deutschland-Ungarn-Rumänien, Entwicklung und Grundfaktoren nationalsozialistischer hegemonial-Bündnispolitik 1938–41". Historische Zeitschrift, 206(1), February, 45–96.
- with Helmut Krausnick, Hans Buchheim and Hans-Adolf Jacobsen (1968). Anatomy of The SS State. Collins: London.
- (1969). Der Staat Hitlers: Grundlegung und Entwicklung seiner inneren Verfassung. ISBN 0-582-48997-0
  - (1981). The Hitler State: The Foundation and Development Of The Internal Structure Of The Third Reich. London: Longman. ISBN 0-582-49200-9
- (1970). "Soziale Motivation und Führer-Bindung im Nationalsozialismus". Vierteljahrshefte für Zeitgeschichte, 18, 392–409.
- with Elke Fröhlich, Falk Wiesemann, et al. (eds.) (1977–1983). Bayern in der NS-Zeit. Volumes I–VI. Munich and Vienna: R. Oldenbourg Verlag.
- (1977). "Hitler und die Genesis der 'Endlösung'. Aus Anlaß der Thesen von David Irving". Vierteljahrshefte für Zeitgeschichte, 25(4), 739–775.
  - (1979). "Hitler and the Genesis of the 'Final Solution': An Assessment of David Irving's Theses". Yad Vashem Studies, 13, 73–125.
  - (1985). Reprinted in H. W. Koch (ed.). Aspects of the Third Reich. London: Macmillan, 390–429. ISBN 0-333-35272-6.
- (1983). "Zur Struktur der NS-Massenbewegung". Vierteljahrshefte für Zeitgeschichte, 31, 52–76.
- with Norbert Frei (eds.) (1983). Das Dritte Reich: Ursprünge, Ereignisse, Wirkungen. Würzburg: Ploetz. ISBN 978-3876400839
  - (1983). Also published as Das Dritte Reich im Überblick: Chronik, Ereignisse, Zusammenhänge. Munich and Zürich: Piper, 1983. ISBN 9783492110914
- (1984). Die Machtergreifung: der Aufstieg der NSDAP und die Zerstörung der Weimarer Republik. ISBN 0-85496-517-3
  - (1987). Hitler and the Collapse of Weimar Germany. Leamington Spa: Berg. ISBN 0-85496-509-2
- (1986). Nach Hitler: der schwierige Umgang mit unserer Geschichte. Munich: Oldenbourg. ISBN 978-3486538823
- (1986). "Wo sich die Geister scheiden. Die Beschwörung der Geschichte taugt nicht als nationaler Religionsersatz". Die Zeit 3 October.
  - (1993). "Where the Roads Part: History Is Not a Suitable Substitute for a Religion of Nationalism", in James Knowlton and Truett Cates (translators). Forever In The Shadow of Hitler? Atlantic Highlands, NJ: Humanities Press, 1993, 125–129. ISBN 0-391-03784-6

== See also ==
- List of Adolf Hitler books
