= Andreas Hillgruber =

German historian (1925–1989)

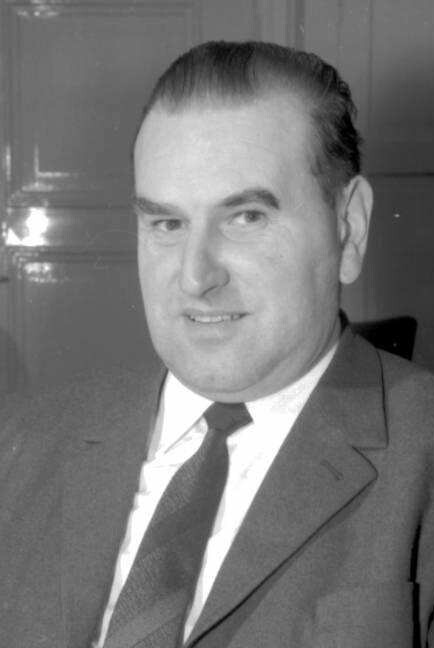
- Born: Andreas Fritz Hillgruber; 18 January 1925; Angerburg, Free State of Prussia, Germany
- Died: 8 May 1989 (aged 64); Cologne, West Germany
- Education: University of Göttingen
- Occupation: Historian
- Employers: University of Marburg (1965–1968); University of Freiburg (1968–72); University of Cologne (1972–1989)
- Known for: His studies in modern German diplomatic and military history, and his involvement in the Historikerstreit
- Political party: Christian Democratic Union
- Awards: Order of Merit
- Military career
- Branch: German Army
- Service years: 1943–1945
- Conflicts: World War II (POW)

Andreas Fritz Hillgruber (18 January 1925 – 8 May 1989) was a German conservative historian who was influential as a military and diplomatic historian who played a leading role in the Historikerstreit of the 1980s. In his controversial book Zweierlei Untergang, he wrote that historians should "identify" with the Wehrmacht fighting on the Eastern Front and asserted that there was no moral difference between Allied policies towards Germany in 1944 and 1945 and the genocide waged against the Jews.

== Life and career ==
Hillgruber was born in Angerburg, Germany (present-day Wegorzewo, Poland), near the then East Prussian city of Königsberg (present-day Kaliningrad, Russia). Hillgruber's father lost his job as a teacher under Nazi rule. Hillgruber served in the German Army from 1943 to 1945 and spent the years 1945–1948 as a POW in France. During World War II, Hillgruber fought on the Eastern Front, an experience that was later to play a role in his evaluation and writing about the period. In 1945, Hillgruber fled west to escape the Red Army, another experience that was to influence him greatly. After his release, he studied at the University of Göttingen, where he received a PhD in 1952. As a student, Hillgruber was a leading protégé of the medievalist Percy Ernst Schramm, an academic who, as Eberhard Jäckel commented, regarded World War II as a normal war that regrettably, the Nazis were not as skilled at waging as they should have been. Much of Hillgruber's early work reflected Schramm's influence. He spent the decade 1954-64 working as school teacher. In 1960 he married Karin Zieran, with whom he had three children. Hillgruber worked as a professor at the University of Marburg (1965–1968), the University of Freiburg (1968–1972) and the University of Cologne (1972–1989). In the late 1960s he was a target of radical student protesters. He died in Cologne of throat cancer.

=== Early historical work ===
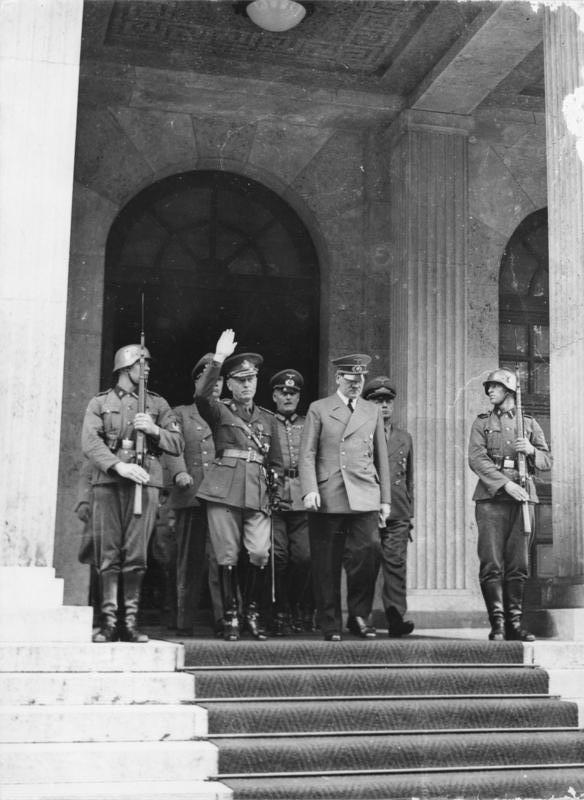
Marshal Ion Antonescu and Adolf Hitler at the Führerbau in Munich (June 1941). Joachim von Ribbentrop and Generalfeldmarschall Wilhelm Keitel in the background. Hillgruber's first book, 1953's Hitler, König Carol und Marschall Antonescu concerned German-Romanian relations in the years 1938–44.

In the early 1950s Hillgruber still saw World War II as a conventional war, but by 1965 in his book Hitlers Strategie (Hitler's Strategy), he was arguing that the war was for Hitler a vicious, ideological war in which no mercy was to be given to one's enemies. In his first book, Hitler, König Carol und Marschall Antonescu (Hitler, King Carol and Marshal Antonescu) (1953), a study of relations between Germany and Romania from 1938 to 1944 with a focus on the personalities of Adolf Hitler, King Carol II and Marshal Ion Antonescu, Hillgruber argued for the fundamental normality of German foreign policy, with the foreign policy of the Reich being no different from that of any other power. Because of the importance of Romania's oil without which the Wehrmacht would have been unable to fight after June 1941, Hillgruber paid special attention to the oil question in German-Romanian relations while assigning the "Jewish Question" in Romania to an appendix, which seemed to imply that the plans on part of Marshal Antonescu to murder all of Romania's Jews were of minor importance. By contrast, in his 1965 book Hitlers Strategie, which was Hillgruber's Habilitationsschrift, Hillgruber examined the grand strategic decision-making progress in 1940–1941 and concluded that, while Hitler had to adjust to diplomatic, economic, strategic and operational military realities, whenever possible his decisions were influenced by his racist, anti-Semitic and Social Darwinist beliefs. Hillgruber's work on German foreign policy made him one of the leading players in the debates about National Socialist foreign policy.

Hillgruber's writings on the Soviet Union show certain constancies as well as changes over the years. He always argued that the Soviet Union was a brutal, expansionary, totalitarian power, in multiple ways similar to Nazi Germany. But, on the other hand, he argued that Moscow's foreign policy was conducted in a way that was rational and realistic, while the foreign policy of Berlin during the Nazi era was completely irrational and unrealistic. The turning point in Hillgruber's attitude came in 1953–1954 when he was involved in a debate with Gerhard Weinberg and Hans Rothfels on the pages of the Vierteljahrshefte für Zeitgeschichte. Together with Hans-Günther Seraphim, Hillgruber had argued that Operation Barbarossa, the German invasion of the Soviet Union in 1941, had been a "preventive war", forced on Hitler to prevent an imminent Soviet attack on Germany. So effectively did Weinberg and Rothfels demolish Hillgruber's arguments that he repudiated his previous views. Thereafter, he maintained that Operation Barbarossa had been prompted solely by Hitler's ideological belief in the need for Lebensraum (living space) in Russia, where a massive German colonization effort was planned and the entire Russian people were to be reduced to slave status. In the 1970s and 1980s Hillgruber often attacked authors such as David Irving and Viktor Suvorov for putting forward the same arguments as he had done in 1954. Along the same lines, he criticized the American neo-Nazi historian David Hoggan, who argued that the British had provoked World War II in 1939. Hillgruber conceded that there was a "kernel of truth" in Hoggan's claims in that Hitler had believed that he could invade Poland in 1939 without provoking a war with Britain, and was most unpleasantly surprised by the British declaration of war, but maintained that, overall, Hoggan's view of Germany as the victim of an Anglo-Polish conspiracy was simply "preposterous".

The exchange between Hillgruber and Weinberg on the pages of Vierteljahrshefte für Zeitgeschichte in 1953–1954 marked the beginning of a long series of clashes between the two historians over interpretations of German foreign policy. In a 1956 book review of Hitler, König Carol und Marschall Antonescu, Weinberg criticized Hillgruber for engaging in what Weinberg considered an apologia for Germany in World War II. Weinberg took issue with Hillgruber's claim that World War II began with the Anglo-French declarations of war on Germany on 3 September 1939, rather with the German attack on Poland on 1 September 1939. In his 1980 monograph The Foreign Policy of Hitler's Germany Starting World War II 1937-1939, Weinberg noted that about the question of the war's origins that "my view is somewhat different" from Hillgruber's. In his 1981 book World in the Balance, Weinberg stated that "Hillgruber's interpretation is not, however, followed here".

== Historical perspective ==
=== Continuities and discontinuities of German history ===
Hillgruber's area of expertise was German history from 1871 to 1945, especially its political, diplomatic and military aspects. He argued for understanding this period as one of continuities. In his first address as a professor at Freiburg in 1969, Hillgruber argued for understanding the entire "Bismarck Reich" as one of continuities between 1871 and 1945. For Hillgruber, the continuities of the "Bismarck Reich" were a certain mentalité amongst German elites, namely a Weltanschauung (world view) that emphasized an "either-or" outlook on international relations, Social Darwinism, a deterministic understanding of history, and dreams of worldwide expansionism. However, though Hillgruber paid attention to structural factors, in his opinion it was the actions of individuals that made the difference. As a member of the "Hitler Youth generation" and a World War II veteran, Hillgruber's major interest was why and how Germany failed as a great power. These interests were reflected in the title of one of Hillgruber's better-known books, Die gescheiterte Grossmacht (The Failed Great Power) (1980), in which he examined German power politics from 1871 to 1945. For Hillgruber, there were a number of elements of continuity in German foreign policy in the 1871–1945 period, especially with regard to Eastern Europe. Hans Mommsen wrote that the "ground-laying works of Andreas Hillgruber... suggested the view for the continuities of German policy from the late Wilhelminian period up to the capitulation".

Hillgruber argued that in the 1870s, Germany had won a position of "semi-hegemony" in Europe, and that Otto von Bismarck had three options for preserving that "semi-hegemony":

- Follow the advice of Moltke the Elder and launch a "preventive war" to destroy France once and all.
- End Franco-German enmity by "compensating" France for the loss of Alsace-Lorraine by supporting the French annexation of Belgium.
- Maintain the status quo of "semi-hegemony".

Hillgruber argued that the "war-in-sight crisis" of 1875 was Bismarck's way of probing the European reaction towards a German "preventive war" to destroy France, and finding that Russia was unsupportive and Britain inclined to intervene, chose the third option. Hillgruber argued that the article under the title "Is War in Sight?" published in a Berlin newspaper close to Bismarck, and which concluded that war was indeed "in sight" was a trial balloon by Bismarck to see what the international reaction would be to a German attack on France. In response to negative international reaction to the "war-in-sight crisis", Bismarck ultimately issued the Bad Kissingen decree of 25 June 1877, in which he called for a situation "in which all powers save France need us and in which they are prevented from forming coalitions against us through their ties to one another". Hillgruber argued that after the "War-in-Sight" crisis that Bismarck followed a conservative foreign policy aimed at upholding the international status quo which was so favourable to Germany.

Hillgruber argued that the accession of Wilhelm II in 1888 marked a watershed in German diplomatic history as Wilhelm was not content with "semi-hegemony" in Europe, and instead sought a power of Weltpolitik intended to give Germany "world power status". To start with, the German decision not to renew the Reinsurance Treaty in 1890 marked the breakdown of the once warm relations between the Hohenzollerns and the Romanovs going back to the 18th century. Instead, Wilhelm preferred a policy of Anglo-German alliance, which he attempted to achieve through a mixture of bribery and blackmail in the form of a vastly expanded German navy. The huge build-up in the Navy known as the Tirpitz Plan spearheaded by Admiral Alfred von Tirpitz with his Riskflotte (Risk Fleet) concept of creating a sufficiently powerful fleet that Britain could never risk war with, had the opposite effect from the one intended on Britain. Instead of leading British leaders to conclude that they could never risk a war with Germany, and therefore must ally themselves with the Reich, the build-up in German naval power led to the Anglo-German naval race of the early 20th century, and Britain aligning herself against Germany. Hillgruber maintained that influenced by Friedrich von Holstein, Wilhelm came to believe in the inevitability of a "race war" in Eastern Europe between the "Teutonic race" and "Slavic race", which ultimately came to be a self-fulfilling prophecy. Hillgruber argued that Wilhelm's policy of Weltpolitik (World Politics) which he launched with great fanfare in 1897 had with the First Moroccan Crisis in 1905 ended in failure, and that thereafter Germany was forced to retreat into a defensive posture in the "bastion" of Central Europe with Austria-Hungary forming the crucial "land bridge" to the Ottoman Empire in the Middle East.

To some extent he agreed with Fritz Fischer's assessment that the differences between Imperial, Weimar and Nazi foreign policy were of degree rather than kind. Moreover, he accepted Fischer's argument that Germany was primarily responsible for World War I, but as a follower of the Primat der Aussenpolitik ("primacy of foreign policy") school, Hillgruber rejected Fischer's Primat der Innenpolitik ("primacy of domestic policy") argument as to why Germany started the First World War. During the so-called "Fischer Controversy" which coalesced the German historical profession in the early 1960s, Hillgruber stood apart from the various right-wing historians who attempted to rebut Fischer, such as Gerhard Ritter, Hans Herzfeld, Egmont Zechlin, and Karl Dietrich Erdmann, by accepting Fischer's arguments in part instead of attempting to rebut Fischer in toto.

Hillgruber argued in the aftermath of Fischer's 1961 book Griff nach der Weltmacht (Grasping at World Power) that the old distinction made by the Swiss historian Walter Hofer between the "outbreak" of World War I in 1914, in which all of the Great Powers were equally at fault, and the "unleashing" of World War II in 1939, in which Germany was exclusively responsible, was no longer acceptable. Hillgruber commented that Fischer had established that Germany was indeed responsible for both world wars, and Hofer's formula had to be disregarded by all serious historians. Having conceded that much to Fischer, Hillgruber went on to challenge Fischer's argument that Germany had started a premeditated war of aggression in 1914.

Hillgruber believed that what had happened in 1914 was a "calculated risk" on the part of the Imperial German government that had gone horribly wrong. Germany had encouraged Austria-Hungary to attack Serbia in an attempt to break the informal Triple Entente alliance between the United Kingdom, France and Russia by provoking a crisis that would concern Russia only, the so-called "calculated risk". Hillgruber maintained that Germany did not want to cause a world war in 1914, but, by pursuing a high-risk diplomatic strategy of provoking what was supposed to be only a limited war in the Balkans, had inadvertently caused the wider conflict. Hillgruber argued that, long before 1914, the leaders of Germany had been increasingly influenced by Social Darwinism and völkisch ideology, and had become obsessed with Russian industrial and military growth, leading to the view that Germany was in an untenable position that required drastic measures. Hillgruber argued that, when the Austrian attack on Serbia caused Russia to mobilize instead of backing down and seeking an accommodation with Germany as expected, the German Chancellor Theobald von Bethmann Hollweg, under strong pressure from a hawkish General Staff led by General Motke the Younger, panicked and ordered the Schlieffen Plan to be activated, thus leading to a German attack on France. In Hillgruber's opinion, the "calculated risk" gambit was a highly dangerous and foolish one, as Bethmann Hollweg and the rest of the German leadership gratuitously failed to anticipate what the most likely Russian reaction to an Austro-Serbian war would be, and that therefore the German leadership of 1914 was extremely irresponsible in trying to use the "calculated risk" of an Austro-Serbian war as a diplomatic device to break the Triple Entente. The German historian Annelise Thimme commented that Hillgruber's "calculated risk" theory to explain World War I was little more than putting "new wine into old wine skins". Thimme noted that Hillgruber relied almost entirely upon the diary of Bethmann Hollweg's aide and friend, Kurt Riezler, to support his "calculated risk" thesis, which was a dubious source because portions of Riezler's diary had been forged after the war to make German foreign policy appear less aggressive than it was in 1914. The Canadian historian Holger Herwig commented that Hillgruber's "calculated risk" theory was the most intellectually sophisticated and ingenious attempt to rebut Fischer's claim of a premeditated war of aggression in 1914, but suffered from his heavy reliance on passages in Riezler's diary likely to have been forged.

In Hillgruber's opinion, after the war had begun, a split occurred within the German leadership between the moderate imperialism of the Chancellor Theobald von Bethmann Hollweg, who wished for territorial gains if they could be obtained, but was prepared to settle for a peace based on the pre-1914 status quo, and a more radical group centered on General Erich Ludendorff and the rest of the Third Supreme Command who wanted total victory over all of Germany's enemies, no matter what the cost, and wide-ranging annexations in Europe, Asia and Africa. In this way, Hillgruber largely followed the distinction first made by Gerhard Ritter between a moderate civilian group in the German leadership centred on Bethmann Hollweg who, while not eschewing territorial expansionism, did not insist on it as a precondition for making peace, and the more radical group in the military centered on Ludendorff, who would settle for nothing less than a war ending in making Germany the world's greatest power. Hillgruber argued that Ludendorff's foreign policy, with its demand for extensive territorial gains together with plans for obtaining lebensraum in Eastern Europe through a program of ethnic cleansing and German colonization, was in multiple ways the prototype of National Socialist foreign policy. Hillgruber argued that the Treaty of Brest-Litovsk and the empire it created for Germany in Eastern Europe was the prototype for Hitler's vision of a great empire for Germany in Eastern Europe. Hillgruber wrote:

To understand later German history one must pay special attention to a consequence of the Eastern situation in the autumn of 1918 that has often been overlooked: the widely shared and strangely irrational misconceptions concerning the end of the war that found such currency in the Weimar period. These ideas were not informed, as they should have been, by an appreciation of the enemy's superiority in the West and the inevitable step-by-step retreat of the German Western Front before the massive influx of the Americans. Nor did they indicate any understanding of the catastrophic consequences for the Central Powers following the collapse of the Balkan front after Bulgaria's withdrawal from the war. They were instead largely determined by the fact that German troops, as "victors" held vast strategically and economically important areas of Russia.

At the moment of the November 1918 ceasefire in the West, newspaper maps of the military situation showed German troops in Finland, holding a line from the Finnish fjords near Narva, down through Pskov-Orsha-Mogilev and the area south of Kursk, to the Don east of Rostov. Germany had thus secured the Ukraine. The Russian recognition of the Ukraine's separation exacted at Brest-Litovsk represented the key element in German efforts to keep Russia perpetually subservient. In addition, German troops held the Crimea and were stationed in smaller numbers in Transcaucasia. Even the unoccupied "rump" Russia appeared - with the conclusion of the German-Soviet Supplementary Treaty on 28 August 1918 - to be in firm though indirect dependency on the Reich. Thus, Hitler's long-range aim, fixed in the 1920s, of erecting a German Eastern Imperium on the ruins of the Soviet Union was not simply a vision emanating from an abstract wish. In the Eastern sphere established in 1918, this goal had a concrete point of departure. The German Eastern Imperium had already been - if only for a short time - a reality.

Hillgruber argued that the Weimar Republic was only a "bridge" between the expansionism of the German Empire and the even more radical expansionism of Nazi Germany, rather than a new era in German diplomacy. In his 1974 book Grossmachtpolitik und Militarismus im 20. Jahrhundert, Hillgruber took a revisionist view of the Treaty of Versailles. Far from being an intolerably harsh "Carthaginian peace" that crippled Germany, Hillgruber argued that Versailles was actually a moderate peace treaty that left the German state intact and with the potential to once again be a great power. Furthermore, Hillgruber argued that with the disappearance of Austria-Hungary and with Soviet Russia widely mistrusted, the outcome of World War I meant that Germany now had the potential to dominate Eastern Europe in a way that never been possible before 1914. Hillgruber argued that none of the states of interwar Eastern Europe had the economic or military potential to be serious rivals to Germany. In 2000, the American historian Robert M. Citino wrote that "Hillgruber's thesis has become the consensus among German historians". Hillgruber argued that Gustav Stresemann was carrying out a "liberal-imperialist" policy in which he sought improved relations with France and by creating an unofficial alliance with the United States in return for which he wanted acquiescence in Germany "revising" her borders with Poland, the annexation of Austria, the remilitarization of the Rhineland, and the return of Eupen-Malmedy. Hillgruber wrote that Stresemann was seeking the return of the Bismarckian "semi-hegemony", which would serve as "the prerequisite and the basis for an active Weltpolitik". In his 1974 essay "Militarismus am Ende der Weimarer Republik und im 'Dritten Reich'" ("Militarism at the End of the Weimar Republic and in the 'Third Reich'"), Eberhard Kolb noted that:

Referring to M. Geyer's research, which had not then been published, Hillgruber pointed out from the mid-1920s onwards the Army leaders had developed and propagated new social conceptions of a militarist kind, tending towards a fusion of the military and civilian sectors and ultimately a totalitarian military state (Wehrstaat).

Hillgruber wrote that after the fall of Hans von Seeckt in 1926, Kurt von Schleicher became "in fact, if not in name", the "military-political head of the Reichswehr". Hillgruber wrote that Schleicher's triumph was also the triumph of the "modern" faction within the Reichswehr who favored a total war ideology and wanted Germany to become a dictatorship in order to wage total war upon the other nations of Europe in order to win the "world power status" that had been sought unsuccessfully in the last war. The total war ideology of the Reichswehr and the attendant demand that Germany be transformed into a militaristic, totalitarian Wehrstaat (defense state) went a long way to explaining why almost the entire Reichswehr welcomed the coming of the National Socialist dictatorship in 1933.

Despite the example provided by Ludendorff and his circle, for Hillgruber, the changes in German foreign policy introduced by National Socialist Ostpolitik (Eastern Policy) were so radical as to be almost differences of kind rather than degree. He argued that Nazi foreign policy was an extremely radical version of traditional German foreign policy. Furthermore, he argued that what during the Weimar era had been the end became, for the Nazis, just the means. He set out a thesis that goals such as the Remilitarization of the Rhineland and the Anschluss with Austria, which had been the end-goals during the Weimar period, were just the beginning for the Nazis. Unlike the Weimar government, the Nazis' desire to re-militarize was only a step on the road to the complete domination of all Europe, and eventual world domination.

In a 1978 essay "Das Russlandbild der führenden deutschen Militärs" ("The Picture of Russia held by the Leadership of the German Military"), Hillgruber examined the views about the Soviet Union held by the German military elite in the period June 1940 to June 1941. According to Hillgruber, the following assumptions were shared by all of Germany's leading generals:

- The Wehrmacht was ill-informed about the Soviet Union, especially the military and the economy.
- Because of the paucity of information, Wehrmacht thinking about the Soviet Union were based upon traditional German stereotypes of Russia as a primitive, backward "Asiatic" country, a "colossus with feet of clay" that lacked the strength to stand up to a superior opponent.
- The leadership of the Wehrmacht viewed war with the Soviet Union from an extremely narrow military viewpoint with little consideration given to politics, the economy or culture. The industrial capacity of the Soviet Union was not considered at all as a factor that might influence the outcome of a German-Soviet war.
- The average soldier of the Red Army was considered brave and tough, but the Red Army officer corps were held in contempt.
- The Wehrmacht leadership after the victory over France was in a state of hubris with the Wehrmacht being seen as more or less invincible.
- As such, it was assumed that the Soviet Union was destined to be defeated, and that it take Germany between six and eight weeks to destroy the Soviet Union.

Hillgruber argued that these assumptions about the Soviet Union shared by the entire military elite allowed Hitler to push through a "war of annihilation" against the Soviet Union with the assistance of "several military leaders", even through it was quite clear to the military that such a war would violate all standards of civilized warfare and would be waged in the most inhumane fashion possible. Hillgruber argued that the decisive moment on the war on the Eastern Front was the Battle of Smolensk in July 1941, which was not quite the overwhelming German victory as traditionally depicted, as though the Red Army had taken more losses, the Battle of Smolensk had blunted the German drive onto Moscow, giving the Soviets crucial time to rebuild. Furthermore, Hillgruber was the first historian to point out that the Battle of Smolensk was closely studied in Japan, and led Japanese decision-makers to conclude the Soviet Union would not be defeated in 1941, thereby helping the "Strike South" fraction in the Japanese government gain ascendency over the "Strike North" fraction.

== The Stufenplan concept ==
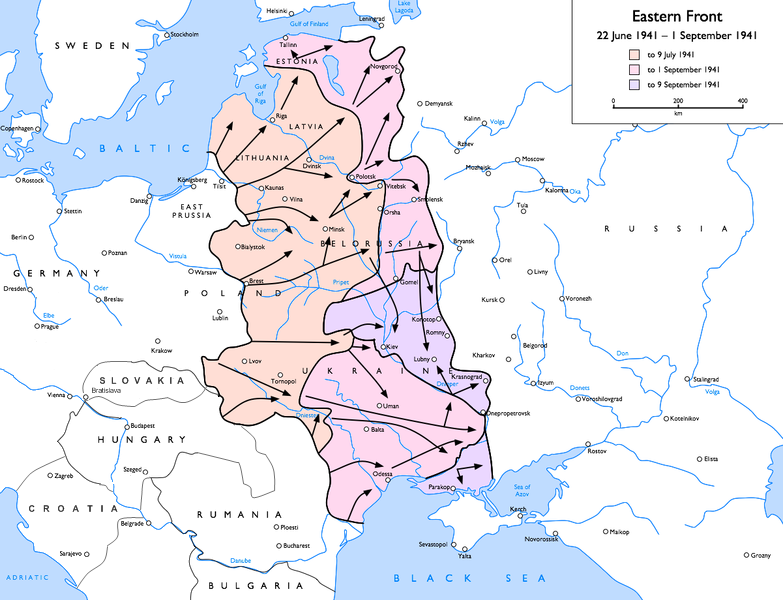
German advances during Operation Barbarossa, 22 June 1941, to 9 September 1941. A Stage in the Stufenplan? Hillgruber saw Operation Barbarossa as the third stage of Hitler's Stufenplan (stage-by-stage plan) for world conquest.

From the 1960s on, Hillgruber was regarded by other historians as one of the world's foremost authorities on German military-diplomatic history, his theory about Hitler having a Stufenplan (stage-by-stage plan) being especially influential. In 1989 the American historian Jerry Z. Muller called Hillgruber "the most distinguished German diplomatic historian of his generation". In 2002, in an assessment of the historiography of the Eastern Front, the German historians Gerd R. Ueberschär and Rolf-Dieter Müller wrote: "Hillgruber developed a considerable reputation before his death in 1989 as the godfather of West German research into the war and a celebrated historian of German state created by Bismarck." The New Zealand historian David Stahel noted that in the 1960s, the historiography of the Eastern Front was dominated by two flawed schools. The first was the Communist school, which saw Operation Barbarossa as the product of a capitalist conspiracy embracing not only the ruling classes of Germany, but also Britain, France and the United States. The second school was that written by former Wehrmacht generals and historians who were too inclined to take the memoirs of the generals at face value, which asserted that Hitler had completely dominated the decision-making with the military being a mere functional elite that existed to carry out the will of the Führer who was too mentally unstable to function as an effective leader, thus making the war of the Eastern Front into one that Germany had lost, rather than one that the Soviet Union had won. At times, the apologist school even suggested that Barbarossa really was a "preventive war" forced on Germany by a Soviet invasion alleged to be planned for July 1941. Stahel noted that Hillgruber was the first historian to put forward an interpretation of Barbarossa that stressed ideology together with contingent elements that has been widely accepted. Stahel further noted that Hillgruber was the first historian to highlight the near-total contempt felt by the Wehrmacht generals towards the Soviet Union, which resulted in the sweepingly optimistic assumptions that underlaid Barbarossa.

=== Hillgruber's account ===
Hillgruber argued that Adolf Hitler had a Stufenplan (stage-by-stage plan) for conquest and genocide in Eastern Europe, and then the world. In the 1960s and 1970s Hillgruber was one of the leaders of a group of German historians - comprising Klaus Hildebrand, Gunter Moltman and Josef Henke - who argued that, far from being haphazard, Hitler possessed and attempted to execute a coherent and detailed foreign-policy programme aiming at nothing less than world conquest. Hillgruber stated that Hitler's foreign policy: "geographically was designed to span the globe; ideologically, too, the doctrine of universal anti-Semitism and Social Darwinism, fundamental to his programme, were intended to embrace the whole of mankind". According to Hillgruber, the conquest of the Soviet Union and the intended alliance with Britain were the most important stages of Hitler's Stufenplan. Hillgruber claimed that though the Fuehrer was highly flexible in ways of realizing his "programme", Hitler was consistent throughout his political career in trying to achieve the "programme" he had worked out in the 1920s. Hillgruber claimed that the outbreak of a world war in 1939 which Hitler had caused (but had not planned) with the invasion of Poland brought forward the timing of his "programme". Hillgruber used as examples to support his theory the Z Plan of January 1939 and Hitler's plans in June 1940 for annexing much of Africa together with key strategic points in the Atlantic; these Hillgruber submitted as evidence that Hitler was moving forward drastically the timing of his planned ultimate show-down with the United States.

According to this argument:

1. The first stage of Hitler's plan consisted of the military build-up of German strength and the achievement of the Weimar Republic's traditional foreign policy goals.
2. The second stage was to be a series of swift regional wars to destroy such states as Poland, Czechoslovakia and France.
3. The third stage envisaged a war to liquidate the Soviet Union and what Hitler regarded as its "Judaeo-Bolshevik" regime.
4. The fourth stage involved a war against the United States by the now Greater Germany in alliance with the British Empire and Japan.

Hillgruber argued that after the conquest of the Soviet Union, Hitler wanted to seize most of Africa, to build a huge navy, and (in alliance with both the Japanese and the British) to engage the United States in a "War of the Continents" for world domination. As Hillgruber described it:

After the creation of a European continental empire buttressed by the conquest of Russia, a second stage of imperial expansion was to follow with the acquisition of complementary territory in Central Africa and a system of bases to support a strong surface fleet in the Atlantic and Indian Ocean. Germany, in alliance with Japan and if possible also Britain, would in the first place isolate the USA and confine it to the Western hemisphere. Then, in the next generation, there would be a "war of the continents" in which the "Germanic empire of the Germanic nation" would fight America for world supremacy.

Hillgruber wrote that:

These enormous schemes, and particularly their connection with racist ideology, were, to be sure, the program of a single individual. But in the case of such prominent provisions as the revision of the Versailles Treaty and the creation of a "Greater Germany", they overlapped with the aims of the old German leadership and the fantasies of a large part of the German public that had never assimilated the loss of the war. To this one must add, however, that the essence of Hitler's program "violated all standards and concepts of German foreign policy to such a radical degree that it... did not penetrate the consciousness of the German public", despite its continual proclamation in his speeches from 1926 to 1930.

The American historian of modern Germany Gordon A. Craig praised Hillgruber for his "masterful delineation of Hitler's grand strategical plan".

Hillgruber maintained that the strategy of Blitzkrieg stemmed largely from economic factors, namely, that for the earlier stages of the Stufenplan, Germany did not have the economic resources for a long war, and that therefore a military programme based upon quality, not quantity, was the most rational use of German economic capacity. Hillgruber argued that Hitler's desire to postpone the final struggle with the United States to the last stage of the Stufenplan was likewise determined by economic considerations, namely that only a Germany with sufficient Lebensraum and ruling most of Eurasia and Africa would be immune to the effects of blockade, and have the necessary economic resources to match the enormous economic capacity of the United States. Hillgruber believed that the interwar period was dominated by a "Cold War" between Britain and the Soviet Union, and that intense Anglo-Soviet competition for worldwide spheres of influence gave Germany the room to maneuver and to assert its interests after the defeat of 1918 as, at various times, both Moscow and London sought better relations with Berlin. In the debate between the "Continentists" (such as Hugh Trevor-Roper, Axel Kuhn, and Eberhard Jäckel, who argued that Hitler wanted only to seize Europe) and the "Globalists" (who argued that Hitler wanted to conquer the entire world), Hillgruber definitely belonged in the latter camp. As a globalist historian, Hillgruber argued that Hitler was always intent upon a war with the Soviet Union and he maintained that Hitler's interest in Admiral Erich Raeder's "Mediterranean plan" in the fall of 1940 as an alternative to Barbarossa was half-hearted at best, and that right from June 1940 Hitler was firmly committed to turning east. Other historians, such as the German historian Wolfgang Michalka, the Anglo-German historian H.W Koch and the Israeli historian Martin van Creveld, have contended that Hitler's efforts to form an anti-British Eurasian "continental bloc" that was to include the Soviet Union in late 1940 as a diplomatic prelude to the "Mediterranean plan" were sincere, that until December 1940 Hitler's first priority was in defeating Britain, and that it was only when Hitler gave his approval to Operation Barbarossa on 18 December 1940, that he finally lost interest in Raeder's "Mediterranean strategy". The British historian Aristotle Kallis wrote that the best evidence suggests that in late 1940 Hitler was serious about carrying out Raeder's "Mediterranean plan", but only within certain strict limits and conditions, and that he saw the "Mediterranean plan" as part of the preparations for Barbarossa by defeating Britain first.

Hillgruber regarded Hitler as a fanatical ideologue with a firmly fixed programme, and criticized the view of him as a grasping opportunist with no real beliefs other than the pursuit of power - a thesis promoted by such British historians as A.J.P. Taylor and Alan Bullock, and which Hillgruber thought profoundly shallow and facile. Moreover, he categorically rejected Taylor's contention that the German invasion of Poland was an "accident" precipitated by diplomatic blunders. Hillgruber argued adamantly that the German invasion of Poland was a war of aggression caused by Hitler's ideological belief in war and the need for Lebensraum (living space). World War II, for Hillgruber, really consisted of two wars. One was an europäischer Normalkrieg ("normal European war") between the Western powers and Germany, a conflict which Hitler caused but did not really want. The other war - which Hitler both caused and most decidedly did want (as evidenced in part by Mein Kampf) - was the German-Soviet one, a savage, merciless and brutal all-out struggle of racial and ideological extermination between German National Socialism and Soviet Communism.

Hillgruber saw Hitler's foreign policy program was totally unrealistic and incapable of realization. Hillgruber argued that Hitler's assumption that a German "renunciation" of naval and colonial claims, in exchange for British recognition of all of Europe as lying within the German sphere of influence, was based on an unviable notion that British interests were limited only to the naval spheres and spheres outside of Europe. Hillgruber noted that Britain was just as much a European as a world power, and would never accept so far-reaching a disruption of the balance of power as Hitler proposed in the 1920s in Mein Kampf. Hillgruber wrote that Neville Chamberlain for all his attachment to appeasement, once he learned that Hitler's aims were not limited towards revising Versailles, ultimately went to war with Germany in September 1939 rather than accept the disruption of the balance of power that Hitler was attempting to carry out". Likewise, Hillgruber argued that Hitler's contempt for the Soviet Union, especially the fighting power of the Red Army, was a dangerous illusion. Hillgruber argued that the lack of British interest in Hitler's proposed anti-Soviet alliance temporarily derailed Hitler's foreign-policy programme in the late 1930s, and led to the ideas of the Foreign Minister Joachim von Ribbentrop, whose anti-British foreign policy programme Hillgruber called the "very opposite" of Hitler's taking precedence in the period 1938–1941 In a 1967 review, the American historian Howard Smyth called Hitlers strategie "a magnificent work based on a thorough study of all source material and literature available in German, English, French, and Italian, and on translations from Russian and Japanese". The German historians Rolf-Dieter Müller and Gerd R. Ueberschär wrote that Hitlers Strategie was

...a book that became the standard work and still retains most of its validity. Despite vehement criticism by some of his older colleagues, Hillgruber undertook a somewhat new interpretation of Hitler's foreign policy in this doctoral thesis...The chief aim of Hitler's foreign policy, imbued with notions of racial superiority, was to conquer a new Lebensraum in the east and achieve a position of world dominance...This interpretation of Nazi foreign policy clearly differed Hillgruber from Fabry and other revisionists, and his work held up well enough to be reprinted twenty years later with only minor changes.

Hillgruber argued that Hitler drew a distinction between winning Germany a Grossmacht (great-power) position through Kontinentalimperium (Continental imperialism) and the goal of Weltmacht ("World Power") where Germany would embark on building a huge navy and win a massive colonial empire in Africa and Asia as the prelude to war with the United States. In addition, Hillgruber argued that Hitler did not wish to destroy the British Empire, as he believed that the United States would take advantage of the collapse of the British Empire to seize British colonies for itself, but at the same time, Churchill's repeated refusals of Hitler's offers to begin peace talks in 1940-1941 left him with no other choice but to work for the destruction of British power.

In his 1974 article "England's Place In Hitler's Plans for World Dominion", Hillgruber argued that, during the Nazi period, German foreign policy went through ten different phases. Hillgruber contended that, during the early phases, Hitler was intent on having the anti-Soviet alliance with Britain he had written of in Mein Kampf and in the Zweites Buch. By the time of the Hossbach Memorandum of 1937, Hillgruber argued, Hitler was undertaking a course of expansion either "without Britain" or, preferably, "with Britain", but if necessary "against Britain". By the late 1930s, when it became clear that Britain had no interest in Hitler's overtures, German foreign policy turned anti-British - as reflected in the Z Plan of January 1939 for a gigantic German fleet that would crush the Royal Navy by 1944.

Hillgruber argued that the 1939 German-Soviet non-aggression pact had its origins in the British refusal to make an anti-Soviet alliance, which led Hitler to turn over much of the running of German foreign policy to Ribbentrop in 1938-1939, and that Ribbrentrop in turn believed that a solid continental bloc of states led by Germany would deter Britain from involvement in Europe. In this connection, Hillgruber argued that for the moment Hitler - under the influence of Ribbentrop - put off his plans for a "grand solution" in the east in favor of an anti-British foreign policy. At the same time, Hillgruber argued that British appeasement had as its aim the goal of securing the peace by making enough concessions to Germany that the Germans would accept the post-war international order created by the Treaty of Versailles, whose legitimacy they had never accepted. Hillgruber that by March 1939, when faced with signs that Hitler's foreign policy went beyond merely revising Versailles in Germany's favor, the British chose to "guarantee" Poland with the aim of "containing" Germany. Hillgruber maintained that both Hitler and Ribbentrop believed in 1939 that Germany could destroy Poland in a short, limited war that would not cause a world war. Faced with clear signs that the British were attempting to create a "peace front" comprising Britain, France, Poland, the Soviet Union, Yugoslavia, Romania, Greece and Turkey that was meant to "contain" Germany (Hillgruber argued), Hitler had - under Ribbentrop's influence - decided in August 1939 to do "a 180-degree tactical reversal" and to seek an alliance with the Soviet Union. Hillgruber argued that Hitler believed Ribbentrop's claim that if Britain were confronted by a Germany that had support of the Soviet Union (which could supply the Germans with all of the raw materials that would otherwise be cut off by a British blockade), then the British would abandon Poland, and thus Germany could destroy Poland without fear of causing a world war. At the same time, Hillgruber believed that in 1939 Stalin aimed to promote war between the capitalist West which would lead to the final collapse of the capitalist system, and would allow the Soviet Union to rule the world. Hillgruber used in support of this thesis Stalin's speech of 19 January 1925. If another world war would break out between the capitalist states (which Stalin saw as inevitable), Stalin stated: "We will enter the fray at the end, throwing our critical weight onto the scale, a weight that should prove to be decisive". However, Hillgruber believed that the initiative for the German-Soviet rapprochement of 1939 came from the German side, and that Stalin sought to play the Germans and the British off one another, to see who could offer the Soviet Union the most favorable deal.

Hillgruber noted that in 1939, when war threatened over Poland, unlike in 1938 when war threatened to occur over Czechoslovakia, Hitler received overwhelming support from the Wehrmacht leadership. The reason for this difference, in Hillgruber's opinion, was the rampant anti-Polish feeling in the German Army. In support of this argument, Hillgruber quoted from a letter written by General Eduard Wagner, who was one of the officers involved in the abortive putsch of 1938, who wrote to his wife just before the invasion of Poland, "We believe we will make quick work of the Poles, and in truth, we are delighted at the prospect. That business must be cleared up" (emphasis in the original). Hillgruber noted that because of anti-Polish prejudices, in 1939 Fall Weiss served to unite Hitler and the German military in a way that Fall Grün had failed to do in 1938.

Hillgruber argued that Hitler's decision to declare war on the United States before he had defeated the Soviet Union was due to Hitler's belief that the United States might quickly defeat Japan, and hence it was better to engage the Americans while they were still involved in a two-front war. Likewise, Hillgruber argued that Hitler's decision to take on the United States in December 1941 was influenced by his belief that the Soviet Union would be defeated by no later than the summer of 1942.

In his 1965 book Hitlers Strategie, Hillgruber caused some controversy with his argument that a French attack on the Siegfried Line in the autumn of 1939 would have resulted in a swift German defeat. In 1969 the French historian Albert Merglen expanded on Hillgruber's suggestion by writing a PhD thesis depicting a counter-factual successful French offensive against the Siegfried Line. However, some historians have criticized both Hillgruber and Merglen for ignoring the realities of the time, and for using the advantage of historical hindsight too much in making these judgements.

=== Alternative interpretations ===
Historians have not and do not universally accept Hillgruber's Stufenplan concept. The British historian E.M. Robertson wrote that the Stufenplan concept seemed to explain much of Hitler's foreign policy, but noted that Hitler himself never spoke of having any "stages" or even a plan at all. Moreover, Robertson commented that Hitler's use of the phrase "world power or collapse" in Mein Kampf is ambiguous and can be interpreted in several different ways. However, Robertson went on to note in support of the Stufenplan thesis several speeches Hitler made to his senior officers in late 1938 to early 1939, where Hitler did claim to be working out some sort of a master plan in his foreign policy, albeit in a very improvised and flexible way. In a 1970 article, the German historian Martin Broszat wrote that Hitler's decision to invade the Soviet Union was not a "calculated plan to realize his Lebensraum ideas", but that he felt compelled to get out from waiting in the summer of 1940 and proceed to a decisive ending of the war". In response to Broszat, Hillgruber wrote: "In reality, Hitler's decision for a war in the East came in July 1940 at a time when he was convinced of the possibility of reaching an arrangement with Britain". Later on, Broszat was to attack the book that first made Hillgruber's reputation as a historian, Hitler, König Carol und Marschall Antonescu dealing with relations between Germany and Romania from 1938 to 1944. Broszat offered up harsh criticism of Hillgruber's book on German-Romanian relations, arguing that Hillgruber had seriously misunderstood the Reich's relations with Romania by focusing only on the Auswärtiges Amt and upon Hitler. Broszat argued that there were two factions competing with each in regard to relations with Romania, namely the "old guard" which comprised the traditional German elites in the Wehrmacht and the Auswärtiges Amt who supported General Ion Antonescu and the "new guard" in the SS and the NSDAP who supported Horia Sima of the Iron Guard. Thus Broszat argued that German policy towards Romania between September 1940 and January 1941 was largely incoherent, with different factions in the German government supporting different factions in the Romanian government, which explains how in January 1941 the SS supported the Iron Guard's coup attempt against General Antonescu while the Wehrmacht and the Auswärtiges Amt supported Antonescu. Broszat maintained that Hillgruber's picture of German foreign policy being run by Hitler at every turn was incorrect because if that were true, the situation in January 1941 during the Legionnaires' rebellion and Bucharest pogrom with the SS supporting the Iron Guard's coup against General Antonescu who was being supported by the Wehrmacht and the Auswärtiges Amt would never had occurred. Broszat argued that ultimately Hitler chose to support Antonescu as part of his general preference for conservatives like Antonescu who were more capable of governing competently over radical fascists like the Iron Guard who were ideologically closer to him, but were also incompetent.

One of Hillgruber's leading critics, the British Marxist historian Timothy Mason, accepted the Stufenplan thesis, but argued that an economic crisis derailed the Stufenplan in the late 1930s. Mason argued that "Nazi Germany was always bent at some time upon a major war of expansion", but the timing of such a war was determined by domestic political pressures, especially as relating to a failing economy, and had nothing to do with what Hitler wanted. In Mason's view, in the period between 1936 and 1941 the state of the German economy, and not Hitler's "will" or "intentions", was the most important determinate on German decision-making in foreign policy. Mason argued that the Nazi leadership, deeply haunted by the November Revolution of 1918, was most unwilling to see any fall in working-class living-standards out of the fear that it might provoke another November Revolution. According to Mason, by 1939, the "overheating" of the German economy caused by rearmament, the failure of various rearmament plans produced by the shortages of skilled workers, industrial unrest caused by the breakdown of German social policies, and the sharp drop in living standards for the German working class forced Hitler into going to war at a time and place not of his choosing. Mason contended that, when faced with the deep socio-economic crisis, the Nazi leadership had decided to embark upon a ruthless "smash and grab" foreign policy of seizing territory in Eastern Europe which could be pitilessly plundered to support living-standards in Germany. In this way, Mason argued, the outbreak of the Second World War in 1939 was caused by structural economic problems, a "flight into war" imposed by a domestic crisis, and not by some master plan for war on the part of Hitler. The Anglo-German historian H.W. Koch in a 1983 essay criticized Hillgruber's picture of Hitler following rigidly preconceived foreign policy he was alleged to have worked out in the 1920s. Koch wrote against Hillgruber that Hitler did not want a war with Poland, and the Molotov–Ribbentrop Pact (in his view) was meant to pressure the Poles into making concessions instead of being (as Hillgruber claimed) a plan for partitioning Poland. The Hungarian-American historian John Lukacs criticized Hillgruber's portrayal of Hitler following a Stufenplan, arguing that there was much opportunism and contingency in Hitler's strategy, with little sign of a master plan. In Lukacs's opinion, Operation Barbarossa was primarily an anti-British move intended to force Britain to surrender by defeating the Soviet Union. Likewise, Lukacs argued that Hitler's statement to the League of Nations High Commissioner for Danzig, Carl Jacob Burckhardt, in August 1939, stating that "Everything I undertake is directed against Russia…", which Hillgruber cited as evidence of Hitler's ultimate anti-Soviet intentions, was merely an effort to intimidate Britain and France into abandoning Poland. In the same way, Lukacs took issue with Hillgruber's claim that the war against Britain was of only "secondary" importance to Hitler compared to the war against the Soviet Union. The Greek historian Aristotle Kallis wrote that there is "no conclusive evidence" that Hitler "...had a clear plan for world domination..."

== As a conservative historian ==
In the 1970s, Hillgruber, together with his close associate Klaus Hildebrand, was involved in a very acrimonious debate with Hans-Ulrich Wehler over the merits of the Primat der Aussenpolitik ("primacy of foreign politics") and Primat der Innenpolitik ("primacy of domestic politics") schools. Hillgruber and Hildebrand made a case for the traditional Primat der Aussenpolitik approach to diplomatic history with the stress on examining the records of the relevant foreign ministry and studies of the foreign policy decision-making elite. Wehler, who favored the Primat der Innenpolitik, for his part contended that diplomatic history should be treated as a sub-branch of social history, calling for theoretically based research, and argued that the real focus should be on the study of the society in question. The exchange between Wehler on one side and Hillgruber and Hildebrand on the other frequently involved charges of bad faith, intentional misquotation and suggestions that the other side did not understand history properly.

In 1971, Hillgruber was a leading critic of the Quadripartite Agreement on the status of Berlin accusing the West German government and the three western powers with rights in West Berlin, namely the United States, Great Britain and France of granting approval to what he saw as the illegal Soviet occupation of eastern Germany and the equally illegitimate East German regime while at the same time accepted the partition of Berlin as permanent. Hillgruber wrote that the agreement had confirmed the "status quo minus" of Berlin, and that the agreement was too vague with the reference to the "existing conditions in the relevant area". Finally, Hillgruber charged that the West had given in by promising to limit contact between West and East Berlin and allowing a Soviet consulate to be established in West Berlin, which Hillgruber claimed was an implicit admission of the Soviet claim that West Berlin was not part of the Federal Republic.

As a right-wing historian, Hillgruber often felt uncomfortable with the increasing left-wing influence in German academia from the late 1960s onwards. In his 1974 textbook, Deutsche Geschichte 1945-1972 (German History 1945-1972), Hillgruber complained that radicals influenced by "the forces of doctrinaire Marxism-Leninism", and leaning towards East Germany, were having too much influence in West German higher education. In the same book, Hillgruber attacked the New Left for lacking the proper methodological tools for the understanding of German history. In particular, Hillgruber argued that the Primat der Innenpolitik thesis employed by historians such as Wehler was not a proper scholarly device, but was instead "an apparent scholarly legitimation" for the New Left to advance its agenda in the present. Hillgruber accused Wehler of "quasi-totalitarian" goals for the German historical profession, and called for conservative historians to make a sustained offensive to defeat Wehler and his "cultural revolutionaries" for the sake of saving history as a profession in Germany. Likewise, despite his partial agreement with Fischer about the origins of the First World War, Hillgruber frequently fought against Fischer's interpretation of the German Empire as a uniquely aggressive power threatening its neighbours throughout its existence. In 1990, Hillgruber was a posthumous contributor to the book Escape Into War?, a collection of essays examining Imperial German foreign policy that attacked Fischer and the left-wing Bielefeld school of historians headed by Wehler for "relativising" history, and making "banal" statements The Canadian historian James Retallack took the view that Hillgruber together with his allies Klaus Hildebrand, Lothar Gall, Gregor Schöllgen and Michael Stürmer were guilty of a "grave injustice" with their attacks in Escape Into War? on those German historians like Fischer and Wehler critical of Imperial German foreign policy. Hillgruber expressed considerable disappointment with the republication of the once-banned work by Eckart Kehr, which Hillgruber dismissed as merely "trendy Marxisants" typical of the intellectual environment of the 1960s-70s. In a book review published in the Frankfurter Allgemeine Zeitung on 18 June 1979, Hillgruber for the most part offered a highly unfavorable judgment of David Irving's work. Despite his criticism, Hillgruber ended his review with the comment that Irving's work "amounts to an indubitable and in no way small merit of Irving". The American historian John Lukacs thought it a sign of Hillgruber's general right-wing biases that he attached no such qualifying words of praise like those he gave to Irving during any of his attacks on left-wing historians like Eberhard Jäckel and Hans-Ulrich Wehler. As part of his criticism of the left-wing social historians, Hillgruber affirmed what he considered the primacy of traditional diplomatic-military history by writing:

Despite the significance of all long-term developments, the great differences between the great world powers have basically determined the course of general history, even in the nineteenth and twentieth centuries.

The Canadian historian Holger Herwig wrote in 1982 that Hillgruber was a follower of Leopold von Ranke's Primat der Aussenpolitik concept. Herwig wrote that for Hillgruber history was made by small political and military elites who were not prisoners of forces beyond their control, and that instead made history through their choices and decisions.

A striking example of Hillgruber's conservative politics came in 1979 when he and his protégé Hildebrand wrote a series of articles to mark the 40th anniversary of the German-Soviet non-aggression pact of 1939. The German historians' Gerd Ueberschär and Rolf-Dieter Müller commented that Hillgruber and Hildebrand "..developed a highly politicized and staunchly conservative interpretation of it [the non-aggression pact of 1939]". Ueberschär and Müller remarked that the articles that Hillgruber and Hildebrand wrote were not really about the Molotov-Ribbentrop pact, but instead were the means of Hillgruber and Hildebrand could attack various trends in the world of 1979 such as détente with the Soviet Union, radical students on university campuses, the theory that the Soviet Union was not a totalitarian dictatorship, and the rise of the functionalist school of historiography that they disapproved of. Ueberschär and Müller noted one of the Hillgruber-Hildebrand articles had as its subtitle "Parallels with Today?" and that article proceeded to answer that question in the affirmative, with Hillgruber and Hildebrand claiming that there was no real difference between the policies of the Soviet Union in 1939 and 1979. Ueberschär and Müller wrote that the article was really about the world of 1979 as opposed to the world of 1939. The Hillgruber-Hildebrad articles were just as conservative intellectually as they were politically. Hillgruber and Hildebrand argued that reach a proper historical "understanding" of the 1939 pact that one had to study and understand in depth the personalities of Hitler and Stalin as instead of social forces in Germany and the Soviet Union. Hillgruber attacked the "many new 'revisionist' views amongst West German historians about an alleged 'polycracy' in the Third Reich", arguing for the traditional picture of Hitler as "the master of the Third Reich". Hillgruber and Hildebrand made a case for the traditional Rankean view of political history as the most important type history, that politics were decided by the leader of the nation as opposed to various social forces from below, and dismissed the claims of multiple younger West German historians who wished to understand political history as an extension of social history. Hillgruber and Hildebrand wrote: "The attitudes of Hitler and Stalin regarding the development and implementation of the Nazi-Soviet nonaggression pact provide clear evidence of dominating, all-important role of the Leader". In this way, Hillgruber and Hildebrand affirmed their belief in the traditional, top-down Rankean Primat der Aussenpolitik approach to history.

A self-proclaimed conservative and nationalist, Hillgruber never denied nor downplayed the crimes committed in Germany's name and in no way can he be considered a Holocaust denier; but he argued that Germany as a great power had the potential to do much good for Europe. For Hillgruber, the tragedy was that this potential was never fulfilled. In his view, the problem did not lie with Germany's domination of Eastern and Central Europe, but rather with the particular way this domination was exercised by the Nazis. He argued that German-Russian, German-Polish, German-Czech, German-Hungarian and German-Jewish relations were traditionally friendly, and lamented that the Nazis had shattered these friendly ties. Others contended that these bonds of friendship had never existed except as figments of Hillgruber's imagination. For Hillgruber, Germany's defeat in 1945 was a catastrophe that ended both the ethnic German presence in Eastern Europe and Germany as a great power in Europe. As someone from the "Germanic East", Hillgruber often wrote nostalgically of the lost Heimat of East Prussia where he had grown up. Hillgruber once responded to a question about what was his fondest wish by replying "to live a life in Königsberg". East German, Soviet, Polish, Hungarian and Czechoslovak counterparts, denounced him as a German chauvinist, racist and imperialist, and accused him of glorifying the Drang nach Osten concept.

However, Hillgruber was prepared to accept, albeit grudgingly, what he often called Germany's "Yalta frontiers" after the Yalta Conference of 1945. What he was not prepared to accept was the partition of Germany. He often complained that the West German government was not doing enough to re-unite Germany. In a 1981 speech, he called on Bonn to create a new German nationalism based on respect for human rights that would ensure that future generations would not lose sight of the dream of re-unification.

=== The intentionalist historian ===
Hillgruber was an Intentionalist on the origins of the Holocaust debate, arguing that Adolf Hitler was the driving force behind the Holocaust. This set Hillgruber against Functionalist historians such as Hans Mommsen and Martin Broszat, whose "revisionist" claims on the origins of the Holocaust Hillgruber found distasteful. Hillgruber was well known for arguing that there was a close connection between Hitler's foreign policy and anti-Semitic policies and that Hitler's decision to invade the Soviet Union in 1941 was linked to the decision to initiate the Holocaust. Hillgruber argued that the Kernstück (Nucleus) of Hitler's racist Weltanschauung (world view) was to be found in Mein Kampf. He believed that the Holocaust was meant to be launched only with the invasion of the Soviet Union. In Hillgruber's view, Hitler's frequent references to "Judaeo-Bolshevism", to describe both Jews and Communism, betrayed his desire to destroy both simultaneously. In Hillgruber's opinion, Operation Barbarossa had been conceived as, and was, a war of total extermination against what Hitler saw as "Judaeo-Bolshevik" system in the Soviet Union. Hillgruber was noteworthy as the first historian to argue for the connection between Operation Barbarossa and the decision to begin the Holocaust. In Hillgruber's opinion, for Hitler from about 1924 onwards:

The conquest of European Russia, the cornerstone of the continental European phase of his program, was thus for Hitler inextricably linked with the extermination of these "bacilli", the Jews. In his conception they had gained dominance over Russia with the Bolshevik Revolution. Russia thereby became the center from which a global danger radiated, particularly threatening to the Aryan race and its German core. To Hitler, Bolshevism meant the consummate rule of Jewry, while democracy - as it had developed in Western Europe and Weimar Germany - represented a preliminary stage of Bolshevism, since the Jews there won a leading, if not yet a dominant influence. This racist component of Hitler's thought was so closely interwoven with the central political element of his program, the conquest of European Russia, that Russia's defeat and the extermination of the Jews were - in theory as later in practice - inseparable for him. To the aim of expansion per se, however, Hitler gave not racial, but political, strategic, economic and demographic underpinnings.

According to Hillgruber, Hitler had four motives in launching Operation Barbarossa, namely:

- The extermination not only of the "Jewish Bolshevik elite" who supposedly governed the Soviet Union since seizing power in 1917, but also the extermination of every single Jewish man, woman and child in the Soviet Union.
- Providing Germany with Lebensraum ("living space") by settling millions of German colonists within what was soon to be the former Soviet Union, something that would have required a massive population displacement as millions of Russian Untermenschen ("sub-humans") would have had to be forced out of homes to make way for the Herrenvolk ("master-race") colonists.
- Turning the Russians and other Slavic peoples not expelled from their homes into slaves who would provide Germany with an ultra-cheap labor force to be exploited.
- Using vast natural resources of the Soviet Union to provide the foundation stone of a German-dominated economic zone in Eurasia that would be immune to blockade, and provide Germany with the sufficient economic strength to allow the Reich to conquer the entire world.

Ueberschär and Müller wrote that "The most instructive analysis of the special nature of the Eastern campaign can still be found in the work of Andreas Hillgruber", and that the four reasons that Hillgruber gave for Operation Barbarossa are still the most convincing explanation for why Hitler launched Barbarossa. In particular, Hillgruber emphasized that Hitler's plans for the East were only the beginning as Hillgruber maintained that Hitler did not have a "European program", but rather aimed at "worldwide blitzkrieg" with the goal of world conquest. Hillgruber argued that on from the summer of 1940 onwards that Hitler saw the conquest of the Soviet Union as providing him with the necessary resources to allow him to defeat both the British Empire and the still-neutral United States, and what was planned for the Jewish population of Soviet Union would also be done in time to both the Jewish populations of British Empire and America. In a 1985 conference, Hillgruber declared that the history of the Second World War could not be treated as a separate event from the Holocaust, and that for the National Socialist leadership, there were no difference between the war against the Jews and the war against the Allies - both events were different sides of the same coin. As such, Hillgruber decried the tendency on the part of historians' to sever the history of World War II from the "Final Solution", and urged historians to start writing histories that took account that the National Socialist "racial revolution" and plans for a German "world power status" were all part and parcel of the same process.

Hillgruber argued that anti-Semitism was very important for the "internal integration" of the various disparate elements of the National Socialist movement, but it was not crucial for the NSDAP's electoral success in the early 1930s, which Hillgruber believed had more to do with the impact of the Great Depression rather with any surge in anti-Semitism. Hillgruber argued that for most ordinary people in Germany who became anti-Semitic that it was a case of them becoming anti-Semitics after becoming National Socialists as opposed to anti-Semitics becoming National Socialists. Hillgruber maintained that Hitler had always intended to exterminate the Jews since the early 1920s, contending that for Hitler a "racial revolution" was needed to win a "global power" position, but that he at first needed to fulfill certain preconditions. Hillgruber contended that for Hitler the invasion of Poland in 1939 was meant to be both the beginning of both the "biological revolution" and to be only a local war, and that British and French declarations of war were an unpleasant surprise which interrupted the full execution of his plans. As such, in Hillgruber's view, Hitler had to put off the full execution of his plans that already began with the war against Poland until France was defeated. In the same way, Hillgruber maintained that the Action T4 programme was part of Hitler's attempts to build a national consensus for genocide and to enlist the support of the bureaucracy (most of whom had begun their careers during the German Empire or Weimar Republic) for his genocidal politics. Hillgruber argued that the limited public protests that took place in 1941 against the Action T4 killings against a backdrop of widespread public approval or indifference to the killings of fellow Germans who just happened to be mentally and/or physically disabled showed Hitler just how easy it was to create a genocidal national consensus, and that crucially the bureaucracy were not amongst those who protested. This was especially noteworthy as the Action T4 killings took place within Germany, and that victims of Action T4 were the amongst the most vulnerable, hapless and weakest elements in German society - people that Hillgruber argued that by all rights should have inspired compassion and kindness rather than a merciless drive to kill them all. This was especially the case as a great many of the physically/mentally challenged Germans killed as "life unworthy of life" in six killing centers thinly disguised as nursing homes were children. Hillgruber maintained that if the Action T4 killings of fellow Germans caused only limited protests in Germany, then Hitler could have reasonably expected that killings of Jews (the vast majority of whom were not German) outside of Germany in Eastern Europe would meet with even less public opposition.

In the 1984 essay "War in the East and the Extermination of the Jews", Hillgruber argued that based on a reading of Hitler's early speeches and writings that Hitler associated Jews and the Communists as one and the same, and accordingly Hitler regarded the destruction of the Jews and the Soviet Union as part and parcel of the same process. Hillgruber argued that the decision to begin the Holocaust was probably taken during the very earliest stages of the planning for Operation Barbarossa in late June to early July 1940, but that the surviving documentary evidence was not conclusive on this point. Based upon Hitler's statements to his generals about the coming war of annihilation against “Judeo-Bolshevism” and Reinhard Heydrich's orders to re-establish the Einsatzgruppen, Hillgruber argued that the decision to start the Endlösung was not taken later than March 1941. Through Hillgruber noted that the massacres of Soviet Jews by the Einsatzgruppen that were to culminate in their extermination were often justified under the grounds of anti-partisan operations, that this was just a mere "excuse" for the German Army's considerable involvement in the Holocaust in Russia and the term war crimes and crimes against humanity were indeed correct labels for what happened. Hillgruber maintained that the slaughter of about 2.2 million defenceless men, women and children for the reasons of racist ideology cannot possibly be justified for any reason, and that those German generals who claimed that the Einsatzgruppen were a necessary anti-partisan response were lying. Hillgruber described the relationship between the Einsatzgruppen and the Wehrmacht as follows:

The practical cooperation of the regular army and the Einsatzgruppen with regard to Jews took this form: Immediately after gaining control of an area the army commander issued orders for the Jews to be registered. Instructions for Jewish residents to come forward and identify themselves were provided on large-format posters, making it easy for the units of the security police and SD to place them under arrest - unless some of them, having learned of their intended fate, fled to the woods or otherwise "went underground"... Just like the Einsatzgruppen in the Rear Army areas, in parts of the Soviet Union placed under German civilian administration the "Higher SS and Police Leaders" had a prescribed set of duties - that included the systematic killing of Jews.

Hillgruber took a rather extreme "No Hitler, no Holocaust" position. He believed it was Hitler alone who made the Holocaust possible. He argued that, even if the Nazis had come to power under some other leader such as Hermann Göring or Joseph Goebbels, for example, the Jews would have suffered persecution and discrimination, but not genocide. Hillgruber once presented at a historians' conference in 1984 a counter-factual scenario whereby, had it been a coalition of the German National People's Party and the Stahlhelm that took power in 1933 without the NSDAP, all the anti-Semitic laws in Germany that were passed between 1933 and 1938 would still have been passed, but there would have been no Holocaust. He maintained that the other Nazi leaders such as Göring, Goebbels and Heinrich Himmler willingly participated in the Holocaust, as did many other Germans in the ever-widening "rings of responsibility" for the Holocaust, but that without Hitler's decisive role there would have been no Holocaust. Despite his emphasis on the role of Hitler, Hillgruber often stressed that the Holocaust was the work of both the German state bureaucracy and the Nazi Party, the apolitical and committed Nazis while "the mass of the German population" accepted "unvermeidlicherweise nur unzulänglich verschleierten Vorgangs" ("a process that could never be more than inadequately concealed"). Hillgruber wrote that:

The evident ease with which people could be recruited and "manipulated", under the civilized conditions of the 20th century, to treat human beings like merchandise and kill them in large numbers ... is the most disturbing aspect; the large number of university graduates involved is the most deeply alarming. One must raise the question - which touches anthropology, social psychology and individual psychology - of a possible repetition under other ideological conditions, in actual or perceived extreme situations and circumstances. Beyond the historian's responsibility to keep alive the memory of the millions of victims, this question - which points to a central problem of the present and future, and thus transcends the historian's task - presents a challenge to us all.

== The Historikerstreit ==
=== Zweierlei Untergang ===
Hillgruber was one of the protagonists in the so-called Historikerstreit, the Historians' Dispute (or Historians' Controversy) of 1986–1987. Hillgruber felt that the Holocaust was a horrific tragedy, but just one of many that occurred in the 20th century. In a 1986 interview, Hillgruber stated there was no moral difference between the Soviet regime and the Nazi regime, and that the Holocaust was not unique. In his highly controversial 1986 essay "Der Zusammenbruch im Osten 1944/45" ("The Collapse in the East 1944/45") from his book Zweierlei Untergang (Two Kinds of Ruin), Hillgruber highlighted the sufferings of Germans in what was then eastern Germany, who had to flee or were expelled or killed by the Red Army. He documented the mass gang rapes of German women and girls, and widespread looting and massacres of German civilians by the Soviet army. It is estimated that in 1945 that Red Army soldiers raped two million German women and girls during their advance into Germany. Hillgruber paid homage to those who had had to evacuate the German population and to those soldiers who did their best to stem the Soviet advance. Hillgruber described the efforts to evacuate the German population, much of which was hopelessly bungled by corrupt and incompetent Nazi Party officials, and the savage and desperate fighting which marked the bloody climax of the war on the Eastern Front.

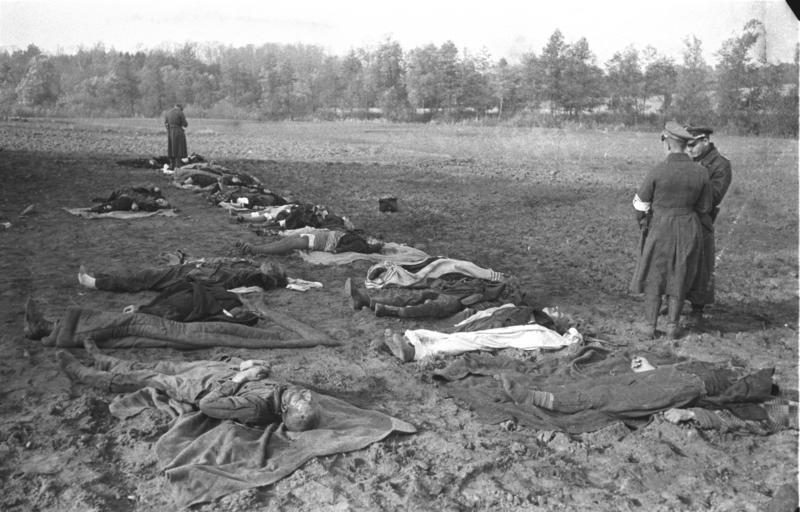
Dead German civilians in Nemmersdorf, East Prussia. A Tragedy Equal to the Holocaust? Hillgruber claimed in Zweierlei Untergang that the killings and expulsion of Germans during the last days of World War II and immediately there afterwards were just as great of a tragedy as the Shoah.

For Hillgruber, the end of the "German East", in which he had been born and grew up, was just as tragic as the Holocaust and marked the end of what he considered to be Eastern Europe's best chance for progress. Hillgruber's intention in Zweierlei Untergang was to show the "obscure intertwinement" between the Shoah and the expulsion of the Germans from Eastern Europe. Hillgruber described it as "a tragedy for all of Europe" that World War II ended with Eastern Europe brought into the Soviet sphere of influence, with the expulsion of the Germans from Eastern Europe (which, Hillgruber pointed out, included his family) and with Germany reduced from a great power to a Cold War battlefield between the United States and the Soviet Union. The two kinds of ruin in the title were the Holocaust and the expulsion of Reichsdeutsche (Reich Germans; those Germans living in Germany) and Volksdeutsche (ethnic Germans living outside of Germany). For Hillgruber, both events, or "national catastrophes" as he preferred to call them, were equally tragic. He blamed both ultimately on the Nazis and their ideologically driven and inhuman expansionism. The subtitle of Zweierlei Untergang, Die Zerschlagung des Deutschen Reiches und das Ende des europäischen Judentums (The Smashing of the German Reich and the End of European Jewry), reflected his controversial view of the moral equivalence of the ending of Germany as a great power and the Holocaust. Despite his claim that both events were equally tragic, Hillgruber wrote much more about the sufferings of the Germans than he did the Jews with the Holocaust essay taking 29 pages compared to the 74 pages allocated to the "smashing" of the Reich.

In the same essay, Hillgruber attacked American President Franklin D. Roosevelt and British Prime Minister Winston Churchill for supporting at various war-time conferences the expansion of Poland and the Soviet Union at the expense of Germany. Hillgruber asserted that Germany had every moral right to keep all the territory that had belonged to the Reich in 1914, plus Austria and the Sudetenland, and that any effort to take land away from Germany was profoundly wrong. Hillgruber wrote that the doomed German defence in the East was "justified" as every city, every town and every village in eastern Germany the Soviets took was "lost forever for Germany and its German inhabitants". In Hillgruber's opinion, what he considered to be the great wrong that Germany was to lose some of its eastern territories after losing the war could only be explained by anti-German prejudices that he accused American and especially British leaders of holding. Hillgruber wrote that the expulsion of the Germans from Eastern Europe was not a response to Nazi crimes, but was instead part of pre-existing Allied plans to destroy Germany, writing that the expulsions were not: "some kind of "answer" to the crimes of German despotism - the full extent of which was not actually recognised while the war was on. They also corresponded to objectives which had long been harboured by the main enemy powers, and which were put into effect during the war".

In an apparent disavowal of his own criticism of the Anglophobic American historical writer David Hoggan in his 1967 book Germany and the Two World Wars, Hillgruber claimed in his 1986 essay that it had been British policy to seek the destruction of Germany since 1907 starting with Sir Eyre Crowe's memo on Germany entitled "Memorandum on the Present State of British Relations with France and Germany". Hillgruber claimed that irrational anti-German prejudices said to be rampant within the British elite drove British policy, and that what happened to Germany in 1945 was merely the culmination of a long-term British policy to destroy Germany as a nation, which every British government had pursued since 1907. According to Hillgruber: "Anti-Prussianism was the basis of the British war policy against Germany". Hillgruber accused the British of holding to "a negative image of Prussia, exaggerated to the point of becoming a myth", which led them to seek the utter destruction of the Prussian-German state in World War II, and blinded them to the fact that a strong Central European state led by Prussia was the only thing that prevented the "flooding" of Central Europe by the Red Army. In this way, Hillgruber argued "that the amputation of the Reich in favor of a greater Poland was a war aim of the Allies long before Auschwitz", and asserted that the loss of the German eastern territories was due to anti-German prejudices. Hillgruber claimed that the Anglo-American strategic bombing offensive against Germany was just as much a policy of Anglo-American genocide for the Germans as the policy of genocide that Germans were waging against European Jews at the same time.

Perhaps most controversially, Hillgruber described how the German Wehrmacht acted in what he regarded as a "heroic" and "self-sacrificing" way in defending the German population against the Red Army and the "orgy of revenge" that they perpetrated in 1944-1945. Hillgruber wrote that it was time to start celebrating what he regarded as the Wehrmacht's "heroic" last stand on the Eastern Front. Hillgruber asserted that the Wehrmacht was fighting in 1944–1945 "for a centuries-old area of German settlement, for the home of millions of Germans who lived in a core of the German Reich - namely in eastern Prussia, in the provinces of East Prussia, West Prussia, Silesia, East Brandenburg and Pomerania". Hillgruber claimed that during the war there were four versions of what Central Europe should look after the war. These were:

- Hitler's vision of a greater Germany ruling over all of Europe from the English Channel to the Urals with all of the European Jewish population exterminated and 30 million Slavs expelled from Eastern Europe to make way for German colonization.
- The conservative German vision associated with the 20 July plotters, who envisioned the destruction of the Versailles system and a greater Germany ruling over all of Central and Eastern Europe.
- The Anglo-American vision which called for a greater Poland up to the Oder–Neisse line at Germany's expense, and an alliance of Poland, Czechoslovakia, Hungary and Austria to keep the peace.
- And finally Stalin's vision which envisioned for the Soviet Union to expand at the expense of its neighbours and the establishment of Communist regimes in all of the countries of Eastern Europe.

Hillgruber claimed that Roosevelt and, even more so, Churchill blinded by their hatred of everything German failed to see that their vision was flawed as it called for the dismemberment of Germany, the only power capable of keeping the Soviet Union out of Central Europe and thus tragically allowed Stalin's vision to prevail.

Hillgruber ended his essay "Der Zusammenbruch im Osten 1944/45" with a call for a history that would take account of what Hillgruber considered the decisive events on the Eastern Front. Hillgruber wrote that:

The mighty happenings between the autumn of 1944 and the spring of 1945 still demand a description and treatment which keeps in view the events on the world historical stage, and yet illustrates the sufferings, deeds, ambitions and failings of men as individuals. This must be one of the most difficult tasks which lie before historians. With stupendous effort historians have researched the decline of the democratic Republic, the rise of the National Socialist movement and its Führer, and the foundation of the Third Reich and its structures. Perhaps the last great demand on this historiography will be to form a comprehensive picture of the collapse of the battle fronts, the conquest of eastern Central Europe, and the shattering of the Third Reich and the fall of the Germanic East, together with all the things that these developments mean.

The British military historian Christopher Duffy was to write in the preface to his 1991 book Red Storm on the Reich that his book was meant to answer the call for the sort of history that Hillgruber wanted to see written about the final days of the Eastern Front. Hillgruber praised those German generals who had stayed loyal to Hitler during the 20 July plot as making the right moral decision. Hillgruber called the leaders of the putsch attempt of 20 July 1944 Gesinnungsethiker (sentimental moralists) and those who stayed loyal to Hitler Verantwortungsethiker (responsible moralists). Hillgruber argued that if Hitler had been killed, the Eastern Front would have collapsed faster than it did, thereby endangering the lives of millions of German civilians, and he therefore condemned the July plot as irresponsible. John Lukacs commented that what Hillgruber appeared to be saying here was that, in light of the Soviet threat in 1944, the right and moral thing for a German to do was to rally around the Führer. In addition, Hillgruber claimed falsely that Himmler had ordered the death camps to cease operating in September 1944, and argued that after January 1945 all the death camps were in Soviet hands anyhow. Thus, in Hillgruber's opinion, the only moral question in 1945 was whether the German Army could hold out long enough to allow as many German civilians as possible to escape westwards. In his essay, Hillgruber raised the "problem of identification" for the historian when writing about the last days of World War II. Hillgruber wrote that, as a German historian, he could not "identify" with those in the German death and concentration camps, for whom the defeat of Germany meant liberation. Hilgruber wrote that, although the term "liberation" was "completely justified for the victims of the National Socialist regime freed from the concentration camps and gaols", it was "inappropriate" as concerns "the fate of the German nation". Hillgruber wrote that the Allies, especially the Red Army, came as conquerors, not liberators, to Germany, and that no German could "identify" with them. Hillgruber wrote:

If the historian gazes on the winter catastrophe of 1944-45, only one position is possible...he must identify himself with the concrete fate of the German population in the East and with the desperate and sacrificial exertions of the German Army of the East and the German Baltic navy, which sought to defend the population from the orgy of revenge of the Red Army, the mass rapine, the arbitrary killing, and the compulsory deportations.

Hillgruber argued when writing about the last days of the "German East" in 1944–1945, only valid perspective was that of the front-line German soldiers fighting to protect German civilians from the Red Army, even through he noted that by holding out the Wehrmacht were "protecting" the gas chambers as he argued the Wehrmacht were "preventing the worse" from being done to the Germans. Hillgruber presented the German defense of the eastern Germany as part of an idealistic, pan-European effort noting with pleasure that French, Dutch, Belgian, Danish and Norwegian volunteers serving in the Waffen SS units, namely the 33rd SS Charlemagne Division, 23rd SS Nederland Division, 28th SS Wallonien Division, and 11th SS Nordland Division had fought fiercely for the Reich, and that in addition many French and Polish POWs helped German civilians escape. Hillgruber argued that the Red Army had a "fundamentally barbarous conception of war", and that the horrors perpetrated by the "Asiatic flood" of the Red Army, which he claimed were without parallel in history made the German stand in the East morally "justified". The American historian Charles S. Maier summarized Hillgruber's thesis in "Der Zusammenbruch im Osten 1944/45" as:

Evoking the Wehrmacht's terrible mission in the winter of 1945, Hillgruber has written, is among the most difficult challenges a historian can face. He refers to the hallowing winter flight before the Russians. Hitler had given orders for impossible defenses of fortress cities; Soviet troops had arrived with apparent license to rape and assault. Millions of German civilians and soldiers waited for occasional trains in bombed out stations, caravanned through the Prussian forests, or precariously sailed through the Baltic to Jutland, often harassed by their own fanatic Nazi officials.

Hillgruber saw the expulsion of the Germans as the culmination of a half century of horror. Hillgruber wrote:

The mass expulsion of the Germans from a quarter of the territory of the 1937 Reich was a provisional end station on the journey that had begun with the spread of the idea of a rationalization of territory according to national allegiance and that had led to the nationality struggles on the European periphery during the First World War. These struggles were followed by the first genocide - that of the Armenians in Turkey - and the mass expulsions of Greeks from Asia Minor. The extermination and resettlement practices of Hitler and Stalin in their respective "spheres of influence" in the period of their partnership in 1939-41 had continued such "exchanges of populations", and mass murder had reached an extreme degree in Hitler's "Eastern War" from June 1941 onward; first the Jews in Poland and in the entire East were to be exterminated, then those in the whole of German-occupied Continental Europe. The idea of mass resettlement in East-Central Europe won ever more support - first in Great Britain and then in the United States, in a complete departure from their humanitarian traditions - as victory became more certain and as the aim of the destruction of Prussia as the allegedly permanent hard core of the German Reich became more and more clearly an actual war aim.

Of the two essays in Zweierlei Untergang, one was a well-regarded summary (at least by those who take an Intentionalist position such as John Lukacs) of the history of the Holocaust. In his essay about the Holocaust, Hillgruber admitted there had been much anti-Semitism in the German Empire, but argued that anti-Semitism was more much prevalent and worse in France, Russia and Austria-Hungary before 1914. Hillgruber believed that, with the appearance of the government sponsored and avowedly anti-Semitic Fatherland Party led by Admiral Alfred von Tirpitz in 1917, anti-Semitism become for the first time sanctioned by the German state. Hillgruber argued that, due to Austrian and Russian influences, anti-Semitism become more common in the Weimar Republic than it had been during the Kaiserreich. Finally, Hillgruber ended his essay by claiming that the Holocaust was Hitler's personal pet project and nobody else's, and that without him there would have been no Holocaust. The other essay concerned the ending of the "Germanic East". Hillgruber argued it was Europe could play its proper place in the world if were in someway under German hegemony, and that Germany's defeat was also Europe's defeat as while since the outcome of the war was to leave Western Europe in the American sphere of influence and Eastern Europe in the Soviet sphere of influence, leaving Europeans and Germans in particular without the prospect of having a "history in the future" (i.e. unable to make their own history)

=== Other historians' reactions and Hillgruber's defence ===
With his favorable description of Wehrmacht activities, Hillgruber drew the anger of the Marxist philosopher Jürgen Habermas who rebuked Hillgruber in a feuilleton (opinion piece) entitled “A Kind of Settlement of Damages” published on 11 July 1986, in Die Zeit. Habermas attacked Hillgruber for allegedly praising the "tested senior officials" in the Nazi Party in the East in Zweierlei Untergang. In fact, Hillgruber had written no such sentence. What Hillgruber had written was a lengthy sentence in which he had commented that different officials of the Nazi Party in eastern Germany evacuated the German public with varying degrees of success. What Habermas had done was to edit Hillgruber's sentence selectively and remove the customary ellipsis that indicate that something is being left out of the quote to produce the sentence about the Nazi Party's "tested senior officials". Hillgruber was enraged at what he considered to be a fabricated quote being attributed to him, which he called a "scandal". Many, such as the British historian Richard J. Evans (who was otherwise highly critical of Hillgruber's historical work), felt that this was an intellectually disreputable method of attacking Hillgruber. In addition, Habermas claimed in a sentence where Hillgruber wrote that Hitler believed that only through the genocide of the Jews “could” Germany become the world's greatest power that Hillgruber's use of the word “could” might have indicated that he shared Hitler's perspective. Habermas wrote: "Since Hillgruber does not use the verb in the subjunctive, one does not know whether the historian has adopted the perspective of the particulars this time too".

It was Habermas's attack in Die Zeit in July 1986 that first drew attention to Zweierlei Untergang, which had until then been an obscure book published in the spring of 1986 by the Siedler press of Berlin. Habermas wrote in his essay first published in Die Zeit newspaper on 11 July 1986, that the work of Hillgruber in glorifying the last days of the German Army on the Eastern Front was, together with the work of Michael Stürmer and Ernst Nolte, intended to serve as a "...kind of NATO philosophy colored with German nationalism". Habermas argued that Hillgruber's claims that Allied plans for the borders of a post-war Germany were due to anti-German prejudices and a "cliché-image of Prussia" was absurd, and that "it does not occur to Hillgruber that the structure of power in the Reich could actually have had something to do, as the Allies had assumed, with the social structure especially well-preserved in Prussia". Writing of Hillgruber's intentionist theories about the Holocaust, Habermas claimed that Hillgruber wrote in such a way as to imply that even top Nazis were opposed to the Shoah, and were only reluctantly forced to participate in the "Final Solution" by Hitler. Apart from philosopher Habermas, numerous historians took issue with Hillgruber's essay, including Hans Mommsen, Eberhard Jäckel, Heinrich August Winkler, Martin Broszat, Hans-Ulrich Wehler, Karl Dietrich Bracher, and Wolfgang Mommsen.

Criticism centered on a number of areas. The following points were raised against Hillgruber:

- Those historians who take a functionalist line on the origins of the Shoah like Richard J. Evans felt that Hillgruber attributed too much responsibility for the Shoah to Hitler. Evans went on to write that Hillgruber had down-played both the level and the virulence of anti-Semitism in pre-1914 Germany, writing that Wilhelm II and his Court were a center of a vicious anti-Semitism that Hitler could have easily approved of.
- Hillgruber largely ignored the fact that the reason for Soviet troops being in Germany in 1945 was that Germany had attacked the Soviet Union in 1941.
- Hillgruber mostly ignored the fact that the same troops fighting to save German civilians from the Soviets were also allowing the Nazis to continue the Holocaust. The Israeli historian Omer Bartov commented that it was simply disgusting on the part of Hillgruber to call upon historians to "identify" with German troops fighting to extend the Holocaust. Furthermore, it was noted that Hillgruber's call for "empathy" for the German troops fighting on the Eastern Front implicitly devalued the lives of those held in the German death camps or forced to walk in the death marches. Critics of Hillgruber such as Bartov noted that his call for historians to have "empathy" with German soldiers placed a higher value on the lives of German civilians protected by the Wehrmacht then on those dying in the Holocaust. In another essay, Bartov commented that Hillgruber appeared to imply that the British government's decision to repudiate the Munich Agreement in 1942 was the basis of the decision to expel the Germans after the war. Bartov commented that Hillgruber appeared not to care that the German aggression against the states of Eastern Europe such as the destruction of Czecho-Slovakia in March 1939, which itself negated the Munich Agreement might have had something to do with the British abrogation of the Munich Agreement, and that there is no direct link between the repudiation of Munich in 1942 and the expulsion of the Germans from Czechoslovakia after the war.
- That the expulsion of Germans from Eastern Europe, which today might come under the rubric of "ethnic cleansing", cannot be equated with the racially-based extermination of European Jewry.
- The sufferings of Germans were presented in isolation, with little reference to the sufferings of Jews, Poles, Russians, Czechs etc. The impression given is that Germans were the primary victims of the war.
- That Hillgruber asked his readers to sympathize with the officers and the men of the German Wehrmacht and Kriegsmarine who fought to protect and evacuate the German population while at the same time to fight for the continuation of the Holocaust is morally indefensible.

The sub-title of Hillgruber's book drew controversy with the Swiss historian Micha Brumlik in an essay entitled "New Myth of State" first published in Die Tagezeitung newspaper on 12 July 1986, commenting that the use of the word Zerschlagung (destruction) for the Germans indicated that an act of extreme violence was committed against the Germans while the Jews were assigned only the neutral term Ende (end) to describe the Holocaust. Brumlik argued that in his view, Hillgruber by his use of the word "End" to label the Holocaust implied that the Shoah was just something terrible that happened to the Jews of Europe, but it was not anybody's fault. Brumlik accused Hillgruber of reducing German history down to the level of Landserheft (a type of comics in Germany glorifying war). Brumlik argued that Hillgruber's thesis about the Holocaust as one of many genocides, instead of a unique event, was a form of "psychological repression". The American historian Gordon A. Craig expressed the view that Hillgruber's choice of the word Ende for the Holocaust suggested that the Holocaust was "something that just sort of happened".

The right-wing German historian Klaus Hildebrand defended Hillgruber in an essay first published in the Frankfurter Allgemeine Zeitung newspaper on 31 July 1986, by attacking Habermas over the "tried and true higher-ups of the NSDAP" line created by Habermas, which Hildebrand considered a highly-dishonest method of attack. Hildebrand argued that Hillgruber was merely trying to show the "tragedy" of the Eastern Front, and was not engaging in moral equivalence between the German and Soviet sides. Responding to the defence of Hillgruber by his close associate Hildebrand in his essay "The Age of the Tyrants", Habermas argued in a letter to the editor of the Frankfurter Allgemeine Zeitung on 11 August 1986, that Hillgruber's approach of "identifying" with German soldiers fighting on the Eastern Front "...would perhaps be a legitimate point of view for the memoirs of a veteran - but not for a historian writing from the distance of four decades". Habermas went to warn of the "apologetic effect" of the sub-title of Hillgruber's book. Habermas stated that:

A German reader would have to bring along a healthy portion of linguistic insensitivity in order not to let himself be influenced by the juxtaposition of an aggressive 'destruction of the German Reich' by its external enemies and an almost automatic following 'end of European Jewry'. This first impression justifies itself above all through the compilation of two parts so unlike in their style of presentation and declared partisanship.

Joachim Fest defended Hillgruber in an essay entitled "Encumbered Remembrance", first published in the Frankfurter Allgemeine Zeitung on 16 August 1986, by arguing that Habermas himself was guilty of euphemistic language such as labelling dekulakization as "the expulsion of the kulaks". The philosopher Helmut Fleischer, in an essay first published in the Nürnberger Zeitung newspaper on 20 September 1986, asserted that there was nothing morally objectionable in Hillgruber's argument for the morality of historians siding with German troops on the Eastern Front. The left-wing German historian Hans Mommsen in an essay first published for Blätter für deutsche und internationale Politik magazine in October 1986 wrote of Hillgruber that:

His [Hillgruber's] historiographic association of resettlement and the Holocaust indirectly supports the plan, so aggressively posited by Stürmer, of relativizing the crimes of the Third Reich. It allows for revisionist misunderstandings by its demand for "a reconstruction of the destroyed European Middle.

Martin Broszat, in an essay first published in Die Zeit on 3 October 1986, wrote that Hillgruber had come very close to being a Nazi apologist, and his book Zweierlei Untergang was simply not very good.

The German publisher Rudolf Augstein, in an essay entitled "The New Auschwitz Lie", first published in Der Spiegel magazine on 6 October 1986, called Hillgruber "a constitutional Nazi". Augstein went on to call for Hillgruber to be fired from his post at the University of Cologne for being a "constitutional Nazi", and argued that there was no moral difference between Hillgruber and Hans Globke. The classicist Christian Meier, who was president of the German Historical Association at the time, in a speech given on 8 October 1986, called the allegations that Hillgruber was a Nazi apologist "nonsensical", but argued that Hillgruber was guilty of "methodological dubiousness" in Zweierlei Untergang.

The German historian Imanuel Geiss wrote in defence of Hillgruber that Augstein's calling him a "constitutional Nazi" was way over the top; that together with Habermas, Augstein was guilty of slandering Hillgruber; that Hillgruber's views deserved consideration; and that Hillgruber was no Nazi apologist. The German historian Hagen Schulze wrote in defense of Hillgruber:

For the discipline of history, singularity and comparability of historical events are thus not mutually exclusive alternatives. They are complementary concepts. A claim that historians such as Ernst Nolte or Andreas Hillgruber deny the uniqueness of Auschwitz because they are looking for comparisons stems from incorrect presuppositions. Of course, Nolte and Hillgruber can be refuted if their comparisons rests on empirically or logically false assumptions. But Habermas never provided such proof.

Hillgruber defended his call for the identification with the German troops fighting on the Eastern Front in an interview with the Rheinischer Merkur newspaper on 31 October 1986, on the ground that he was only trying "…to experience things from the perspective of the main body of the population". In the same 1986 interview, Hillgruber said it was necessary for a more nationalistic version of German history to be written because the East German government was embarking upon a more nationalist history, and if West German historians did not keep up with their East German counterparts in terms of German nationalism, it was inevitable that Germans would come to see the East German regime as the legitimate German state. Hillgruber was most furious with Augstein's "constitutional Nazi" line, and stated that he was considering suing Augstein for libel. Replying to the interviewer's question about whether he thought the Holocaust was unique, Hillgruber stated:

...that the mass murder of the kulaks in the early 1930s, the mass murder of the leadership cadre of the Red Army in 1937–38, and the mass murder of the Polish officers who in September 1939 fell into Soviet hands are not qualitatively different in evaluation from the mass murder in the Third Reich.

In response to the interviewer's question about whatever he was a "revisionist" (by which the interviewer clearly meant negationist), Hillgruber stated that:

Revision of the results of scholarship is, as I said, in itself the most natural thing in the world. The discipline of history lives, like every discipline, on the revision through research of previous conceptualizations.... Here I would like to say that in principle since the mid-1960s substantial revisions of various kinds have taken place and have rendered absurd the clichéd "image" that Habermas as a nonhistorian obviously possesses.

Replying to the interviewer's question about whether he wanted to see the revival of the original concept of the Sonderweg, that is of the idea of Germany as a great Central European power equally opposed to both the West and the East, Hillgruber denied that German history since 1945 had been that "golden", and claimed that his conception of the Central European identity he wanted to see revived was cultural, not political. Hillgruber called the idea of Germany as great power that would take on and being equally opposed to the United States and the Soviet Union as:

...historically hopeless because of the way the Second World War ended. To want to develop such a projection now would mean to bring the powers in the East and the West together against the Germans. I cannot imagine that anyone is earnestly striving for that. Reminiscences of good cooperation between the Germans and Slavic peoples in the middle of Europe before the First World War, and in part also still between the wars, are awakened whenever journalists or historians travel to Poland, Czechoslovakia, or Hungary. In that atmosphere it seems imperative to express how closely one feels connected to representatives of these nations. This is understandable, but it cannot all merge into a notion of "Central Europe" that could be misunderstood as taking up the old concept again, which is, as I have said, no longer realizable. In a word, I think the effort to latch on to the connections torn apart in 1945, because of the outcome of the war, and then in turn because of the Cold War, is a sensible political task, especially for West Germans.

In another essay first published in the Die Zeit newspaper on 7 November 1986, Habermas wrote that: "This longing for the unframed memories from the perspective of the veterans can now be satisfied by reading Andreas Hillgruber's presentation of the events on the Eastern Front in 1944–1945. The 'problem of identification', something that is unusual for an historian, poses itself to the author only because he wants to incorporate the perspective of the fighting troops and the affected civilian population". In a newspaper 'feuilleton' entitled "Not a Concluding Remark", first published in the Frankfurter Allgemeine Zeitung on 20 November 1986, Meier wrote that:

What moved Hillgruber to "identify" with the defenders of the front in East Prussia will probably have to remain a mystery…But however that may be, and whatever other weaknesses his book contains, it cannot be accused of trivializing National Socialism. In this respect, Habermas's concerns are certainly without foundation.

The political scientist Kurt Sontheimer, in an essay entitled "Makeup Artists Are Creating a New Identity" first published in Rheinischer Merkur newspaper on 21 November 1986, accused Hillgruber of being guilty of "revisionism" (by which Sontheimer clearly meant negationism) in his writings on German history. In another essay entitled "He Who Wants to Escape the Abyss" first published in Die Welt newspaper on 22 November 1986, Hildebrand accused Habermas of engaging in "scandalous" attacks on Hillgruber. Hildebrand claimed that "Habermas's criticism is based in no small part on quotations that unambiguously falsify the matter". Responding to Meier's comment on why he chose to "identify" with German troops in a letter to the editor of the Frankfurter Allgemeine Zeitung on 29 November 1986, Hillgruber wrote:

Is it really so difficult for a German historian (even if he is, like Meier, a specialist in ancient history) to realize why the author of an essay about the collapse in the East in 1944-45 identifies with the efforts of the German populace? I identified with the German efforts not only in East Prussia, but also in Silesia, East Brandenburg and Pomerania (Meier's homeland) to protect themselves from what threatened them and to save as many people as possible.

The German historian Wolfgang Mommsen, in an essay entitled "Neither Denial nor Forgetfulness Will Free Us" first published in Frankfurter Rundschau newspaper on 1 December 1986, wrote about Hillgruber's demands that historians identified with the "justified" German defence of the Eastern Front that:

Andreas Hillgruber recently attempted to accord a relative historical justification to the Wehrmacht campaign in the East and the desperate resistance of the army in the East after the summer of 1944. He argued that the goal was to prevent the German civilian population from falling into the hands of the Red Army. However, the chief reason, he argued, was that the defense of German cities in the East had become tantamount to defending Western civilization. In light of the Allied war goals, which, independent of Stalin's final plans, envisioned breaking up Prussia and destroying the defensive position of a strong, Prussian-led Central European state that could serve as a bulwark against Bolshevism, the continuation of the war in the East was justified from the viewpoint of those involved. It was, as Hillgruber's argument would have it, also justified even from today's standpoint, despite the fact that prolonging the war in the East meant that the gigantic murder machinery of the Holocaust would be allowed to continue to run. All this, the essay argued, was justified as long as the fronts held. Hillgruber's essay is extremely problematic when viewed from the perspective of a democratically constituted community that orients itself towards Western moral and political standards.

There is no getting around the bitter truth that the defeat of National Socialist Germany was not only in the interest of the peoples who were bulldozed by Hitler's war and of the peoples who were selected by his henchmen for annihilation or oppression or exploitation - it was also in the interest of the Germans. Accordingly, parts of the gigantic scenery of the Second World War were, at least as far as we were concerned, totally senseless, even self-destructive. We cannot escape this bitter truth by assigning partial responsibility to other partners who took part in the war.

In an essay published in the 1 December 1986, edition of the New Republic, entitled "Immoral Equivalence", the American historian Charles S. Maier criticized Hillgruber for engaging in "vulgar Historismus" in Zweierlei Untergang. Maier wrote the historian is supposed to examine all sides of historical occurrences, and not serve as the advocate of one side. Maier wrote:

Hillgruber goes on to claim, moreover, that Stalin, Roosevelt, and above all Churchill had long harbored designs to dismember Germany. It does not seem relevant to Hillgruber's way of thinking that German aggression might indeed have led the Allies to contemplate partition; in any case the notion was rejected in theory, and partition came about only as a result of circumstances when the war ended. Hillgruber's historical contribution to "winning the future" thus amounts to the old Prusso-German lament, dusted off and refurbished, that the Machiavellian British were always conspiring to encircle the Reich. Predictably enough, the essay closes with a lament that after 1945, Prussia and Germany would not longer be able to fulfill their mediating role between East and West. But precisely what sort of "mediating role" had brought all those German soldiers to Stalingrad in the first place?

Maier noted that in marked contrast to the way Hillgruber highlighted the suffering of German civilians on the Eastern Front in dramatic and emotionally charged language in the first essay, in the second essay:

...that Hillgruber's second and (brief) chapter on the extermination of the Jews might seem pallid after the emotional exercise in "identification" that precedes it. No depiction of sealed freight cars, purposeful starvation, degradation, and the final herding to the gas chambers parallels Hillgruber's vivid evocation of the East Prussian collapse. Not that Hillgruber minimizes the crimes of the SS (through he ignores the massacres of Red Army prisoners by his heroic Wehrmacht).

Maier called Zweierlei Untergang not an "evil book", but one that was "...badly balanced; and its particular imbalance opens the way to apologia". Finally, Maier rejected Hillgruber's claim of moral equivalence between the actions of the Soviet Communists and German Nazis on the grounds that while the former were extremely brutal, the latter sought the total extermination of a people, namely the Jews. The German historian Horst Möller defended Hillgruber in an essay first published in late 1986 in the Beiträge zur Konfliktforschung magazine by arguing that:

Hillgruber comes to the conclusion, on the basis of British files that have come to light in the meantime, that the destruction of the German Reich was planned before the mass murder of the Jews became known - and that the mass murder does not explain the end of the Reich ... It is hardly disputable that the attempt to hold the Eastern Front as long as possible against the Red Army meant protection for the German civilian populace in the eastern provinces against murders, rapes, plundering and expulsions by Soviet troops. It was not simply Nazi propaganda against these "Asiatic hordes" that caused this climate of fear. It was the concrete examples of Nemmersdorf in October 1944, mentioned by Hillgruber, that had brought the horror of the future occupation into view.

The jurist Joachim Perels, in an essay first published in the Frankfurter Rundschau newspaper on 27 December 1986, thought it was outrageous for Hillgruber to praise those German officers who stayed loyal to Hitler during the 20 July putsch as making the right moral choice, and felt that Hillgruber had slandered those Germans who chose to resist the Nazi regime as traitors who let down their country in its hour of need.

In an essay meant to reply to Habermas's criticism entitled "Jürgen Habermas, Karl-Heinz Janßen, and the Enlightenment in the Year 1986" first published in the right-wing Geschichte in Wissenschaft und Unterricht (History In Academics and Instruction) magazine in December 1986, Hillgruber accused Habermas of engaging in "scandalous" methods of attack. In answer to Habermas's criticism of the sub-title of his book, Hillgruber argued that the title of his Holocaust essay, "Der geschichtliche Ort der Judenvernichtung" (The Historical Locus Of The Annihilation Of The Jews) and the first sentence of his book, in which he spoke of the "murder of the Jews in the territory controlled by National Socialist Germany", disproved Habermas's point. In particular, Hillgruber was highly furious over the sentence about "tried and true higher-ups of the NSDAP" that Habermas had created by selective editing of Hillgruber's book. Hillgruber claimed that Habermas was waging a "campaign of character assassination against Michael Stürmer, Ernst Nolte, Klaus Hildebrand and me in the style of the all-too-familiar APO pamphlets of the late 1960s" [Hillgruber was attempting to associate Habermas with the APO here]. Hillgruber described Habermas as a kind of left-wing literary hit-man who had asked to "take apart" Zweierlei Untergang by Karl-Heinz Janßen, the editor of the culture section of the Die Zeit newspaper.

Reacting to Habermas's criticism that in the Holocaust essay in Zweierlei Untergang that his use of the word "could" in a sentence where Hillgruber wrote that Hitler believed only through genocide of the Jews could Germany become a great power, which Habermas claimed might have indicated that Hillgruber shared Hitler's viewpoint, Hillgruber took much umbrage to Habermas's claim. Hillgruber stated that what he wrote in his Holocaust essay was that the German leadership in 1939 was divided into three factions. One, centred on the Nazi Party and the SS, saw the war as a chance to carry out the "racial reorganization" of Europe via mass expulsions and German colonization, whose roots Hillgruber traced to the war aims of the Pan-German League in the First World War. Another faction comprised the traditional German elites in the military, the diplomatic service and the bureaucracy, who saw the war as a chance to destroy the settlement established by the Treaty of Versailles and to establish the world dominance that Germany had sought in the First World War. And finally, there was Hitler's "race" program, which sought the genocide of the Jews as the only way to ensure that Germany would be a world power. Hillgruber insisted that he was only describing Hitler's beliefs, and did not share them. Hillgruber argued that only by reading his second essay about the Holocaust in Zweierlei Untergang could one understand the first essay about the "collapse" on the Eastern Front. Hillgruber compared the feelings of Germans about the lost eastern territories to the feelings of the French about their lost colonies in Indochina. Hillgruber claimed that, when writing about the end of the "German East" in 1945, to understand the "sense of tragedy" that surrounded the matter one had to take the side of the German civilians who were menaced by the Red Army, and the German soldiers fighting to protect them. Hillgruber went on to write that Habermas was seeking to censor him by criticizing him for taking the German side when discussing the last days of the Eastern Front. Replying to Habermas's charge that he was a "neo-conservative", Hillgruber wrote:

How does he come to come categorize my work as having so-called neoconservative tendencies? For decades I have never made any bones about my basic conservative position. Deeply suspicious as I am of all "leftist" and other world-improving utopias, I will gladly let the label "conservative" apply to me, meant through it is as a defamation. But what is the meaning of the prefix "neo"? No one "challenges" this new "battle" label, so often seen these days, in order to turn this APO jargon against the inventor of the label.

Hillgruber argued that there was a contradiction in Habermas's claim that he was seeking to revive the original concept of the Sonderweg, that is, the ideology of Germany as a great Central European power that was neither of the West or the East which would mean closing Germany off to the culture of the West while at the same time accusing him of trying to create a "NATO philosophy". Hillgruber took the opportunity to once more restate his belief that there was no moral difference between the actions of the German Nazis and the Soviet Communists, and questioned whether the Holocaust was a "singular" event. Finally, Hillgruber accused Habermas of being behind the "agitation and psychic terror" suffered by non-Marxist professors in the late 1960s, and warned him that if he was trying to bring back "...that unbearable atmosphere that ruled in those years at West German universities, then he is deluding himself".

The left-wing German historian Imanuel Geiss wrote in an essay first published in the Evangelische Kommentare magazine in February 1987 that both the essays in Zweierlei Untergang were "respectable", but that it was "irritating" and ill-advised on the part of Hillgruber to publish them together, with the implied moral equivalence between the expulsion of the Germans from Eastern Europe, and the genocide of the Jews. Geiss accused Habermas of engaging in a "malicious insinuation" in his attacks on Hillgruber. Geiss wrote that Hillgruber's demand that historians had to side with German troops fighting on the Eastern Front was problematic, but it did "...not justify the merciless severity, almost in the tone of an Old Testament prophet with which Habermas goes after this dissident historian".

Responding to Hillgruber in his "Note" of 23 February 1987, Habermas argued that Hillgruber's approach to history "justifies" the use of the line "tried and true higher-ups of the Nazi Party" as a method of attack. Habermas went on to argue that: "And in any case, this ridiculous dispute about words and secondary virtues just confirms Hillgruber's lack of objectivity about this entire sphere. This a case of praising the fire department that set the fire". Habermas ended his article with the remark that Hillgruber was an extremely shoddy historian, claiming that Hillgruber's charge that he was a leading 60s radical who was behind "...the agitation unleashed by extreme leftists at West German universities and on the psychic terror aimed at individual non-Marxist colleagues" was simply not supported by the facts, and told Hillgruber to read one of his own books about his actions in the late 1960s before making such claims.

In response to Habermas, Hillgruber in "Concluding Remarks" of 12 May 1987, wrote of "...the peculiar way this philosopher [Habermas] deals with texts", and accused Habermas of engaging in "...evasion, diversion, sophist hair-splitting and - once again - by misrepresenting my statements". Hillgruber went on to state that in his opinion:

Habermas, and this is evident from a large number of reviews of his works by authors of varying political affiliations, tends to descend upon these texts, even if they are philosophical texts (even classics such as the works of Kant and Hegel are not excepted) in a way that is no different than what he did to my historical essay. He does this with more or less grotesque distortions of quotations, excerpts that twist meaning, and quotations transplanted out of their context in order to provide the kind of confusion that causes the reader to be blinded and dazzled.

Hillgruber ended his "Concluding Remarks" by remarking that it was impossible to debate Habermas due to his slippery and dishonest nature, and he now ending his participation in the Historikerstreit to focus on his historical research.

In a 1987 essay entitled "German Historians and the Trivialization Of Nazi Criminality", the Austrian-born Israeli historian Walter Grab blasted Hillgruber for what he saw as Hillgruber's sympathy for the Junkers and German officer class, with Grab stating that they were willing accomplices in the Machtergreifung (Seizure of Power) and the dream of Lebensraum for Germany in Eastern Europe. Furthermore, Grab attacked Hillgruber for maintaining that Soviet concepts of war were fundamentally barbaric as being reminiscent of Nazi propaganda against Slavic Untermenschen (sub-humans). Moreover, Grab maintained that the period from the fall of 1944 until the war's end in May 1945 was the bloodiest period of the war, and that Hillgruber's comments about the "justified" German defense in the East as preventing a greater "catastrophe" for Germany simply ignored the carnage caused by prolonging a lost war. Finally, Grab was highly critical of Hillgruber's viewpoint that German foreign policy up to 1939 was basically legitimate in seeking to destroy the Treaty of Versailles, and that Hitler's main sin was the seeking of Lebensraum over the ruins of the Soviet Union. Grab argued that there was a contradiction between Hillgruber's claim that the destruction of Germany had supposedly long been an aim of the Great Powers (especially Britain's) before World War II, and that Hillgruber's other point that Hitler had by going too far provoked a war that resulted in the destruction of Germany.

In his 1988 book Entsorgung der deutschen Vergangenheit?: ein polemischer Essay zum "Historikerstreit" (Exoneration of the German past?: A polemical essay about the 'Historikerstreit'), Hillgruber's old enemy Hans-Ulrich Wehler wrote about Hillgruber's intentionist theories about the Holocaust that:

This survey is directed - among other matters - against the apologetic effect of the tendency of interpretations that once more blame Hitler alone for the 'Holocaust' - thereby exonerating the older power elites and the Army, the executive bureaucracy, and the judiciary ...and the silent majority who knew.

In another essay, Wehler wrote:

An even closer connection between academic and political interests is apparent in Andreas Hillgruber's Zweierlei Untergang, where the plight of the German Army on the Eastern Front and the civilian population of eastern Germany is treated without any countervailing consideration for the fate of the Jewish and Slavic "subhumans", the members of the German opposition, and incarcerated groups, or indeed for the Europeans subject to German occupation, and the German people themselves, all caught up in a senselessly prolonged "total war". Such a position unavoidably carries immensely oppressive political implications. His laments over the destruction of the "European center", Germany's intermediary position between East and West, and her loss of great power status is shot through with countless political value judgments. His guiding position (later admitted openly), according to which the loss of the eastern provinces and the expulsion of the German population westward represented "probably the most burdensome consequence of the war", is in itself a matter for political discussion.

Such political implications can only lead us down the wrong path - not to mention a scientific dead-end. In all likelihood it was Hillgruber's aversion to methodological and theoretical reflection that was largely responsible for this wrong turn. Be that as it may, the political effect of Zweierlei Untergang has been downright fatal. It has led to the return of an unreflecting nationalism, in which sympathetic identification with the German Army on the Eastern Front and with the German civilian population has become dogma. Such a worldview has led an otherwise extremely knowledgeable historian to extrude and exclude the victims of National Socialism from his narrative, an omission that would once have been unimaginable but that we now see in black and white. The consequences of a naive attempt to identify with the subjects of historical writing could hardly be demonstrated more drastically.

The American historian Anson Rachinbach wrote against Hillgruber that:

Hillgruber never explicitly relates the two essays, which with the collapse of the German Army on the Eastern Front and with the "Final Solution" in the East. Nevertheless, the effect of their juxtaposition is strikingly clear: the first essay laments the final days of the German Army and the consequences of the Russian conquest of Germany as a German "national catastrophe", the second is a dry and ascetic account of the Nazi crime against the Jews in light of recent historical works on anti-Semitism. Placed together, it is difficult to escape the conclusion which appears on the book jacket, "that the amputation of the Reich in favor of a greater Poland was a war aim of the Allies long before Auschwitz". The destruction of the German Army, the terror unleashed by the Soviet Army, and the complicity of the Allies in dismembering the eastern part of Germany are all tragic consequences of the blind anti-Prussianism of the Allies, independent of Hitler's crimes... Hillgruber argues that the division of Germany and its loss of global political status as a "failed world power" (gescheiterte Grossmacht) was a consequence of anti-Prussian (not expressly anti-Hitler) war aims of the Allies. In World War II, the legitimate "core" of the desire for revision (of Germany's eastern borders and its Untertan role in world affairs) in the Weimar Republic was perverted by the "Hitler Reich". The German catastrophe is the end of a "politically fully sovereign great power German Reich" and the "unconscious retreat of the majority of Germans in the postwar years from their nation". The "German Question", in short, has to be separated from its subversion by Hitler. The defense of the nation is divorced from the catastrophic policies of the leader.

The American historian Charles S. Maier continued his criticism of Hillgruber in his 1988 book The Unmasterable Past. Maier wrote that Hillgruber in Zweierlei Untergang had made some of the ideas of the German far-right "...presentable with footnotes". Maier wrote that Hillgruber's point about the death camps ceasing to operate in the winter of 1944–1945 was irrelevant as he ignored the concentration camps and the death marches. Maier wrote:

"Life" in the concentration camps within greater Germany did grow crueler as deportations ceased: Anne Frank, like so many others, perished inside Germany only a couple of months before she might have been liberated. Moreover, forced marches of surviving Jews from camps shut down in the East to those still functioning in the West took the lives of tens of thousands, as did deportations among what remained of Hungary's Jewish population in the last winter of the war. German courts sentenced 5,764 countrymen to death for crimes of opposition during 1944 and at least 800 from January to May 1945. Buckled to the guillotine or dangling in slow nooses, the victims probably identified less with the Reichswehr than has the historian.

Maier went on to write that the historian has to understand the people whom he or she is writing about, and understanding does not necessarily mean "identification" as Hillgruber claimed, and that the historian has to understand a plurality of viewpoints, not just one as Hillgruber was trying to claim. Maier wrote about the cool, detached way Hillgruber described the Holocaust as compared to his anger about the expulsion of the Germans, and argued that Hillgruber's choice of the word Judentum (Jewry) instead of Juden (Jews) indicated a certain aloofness on his part about the Holocaust. Maier argued that through there was no "anti-Semitic agenda" in Zweierlei Untergang, that Hillgruber's book reflected his conservative politics and was intended to create a positive German national identity by restoring what Hillgruber considered the honour of the German Army on the Eastern Front. Maier concluded that through Hillgruber believed Hitler to have "maniacal" views, his Germany as the threatened "land in the middle" geopolitics-Primat der Aussenpolitik approach to history meant the last stand of the Wehrmacht on the Eastern Front was still "sub specie necessitatis" (under the sight of necessity). The American historian Jerry Muller wrote in the May 1989 edition of Commentary that the best "antidote" to the version of Anglo-German relations presented in Zweierlei Untergang and the "pseudo-history" of Ernst Nolte were Hillgruber's own writings prior to 1986. Muller wrote that Hillgruber himself had noted in Zweierlei Untergang that every day the Wehrmacht held out meant that the Holocaust continued for one more day, but then criticized Hillgruber for having ducked this issue by claiming that one had to understand and "identify" with the concerns and fears of German civilians threatened by the Red Army. Muller complained about the "arbitrariness" of Hillgruber's demand that historians should "identify" with the people of East Prussia instead of the Jews suffering and dying in the death camps. But Muller went on to defend Hillgruber from Habermas. Muller wrote:

But Habermas went further - much further. Quoting Hillgruber's statement that Hitler sought the physical extermination of all Jews "because only through such a "racial revolution" could he secure the "world-power status" for which he strove", Habermas claimed that the world "could" in this sentence makes it unclear whether or not Hillgruber shares Hitler's perspective. Here was an insinuation that would recur two years later, when Philipp Jenninger would similarly be accused of holding views he was only describing" (Philipp Jenninger was a German politician forced to resign as the speaker of the Bundstag in November 1988 after giving a speech that through meant to condemn Nazi crimes erroneously gave the impression that he shared the Nazi perspective).

Muller further argued that it was unjust for Habermas to lump Hillgruber and Nolte together, accusing Habermas of making a guilt by association attack. The Israeli historian Dan Diner wrote:

Andreas Hillgruber sought - and this is why his approach is problematic - to realize a nationalistic perspective capable of eliciting sympathetic identification. Such a perspective claims to be inimical to the Nazi regime; yet is still seeks to preserve national identification (and thus national continuity) in spite of National Socialism. Thus Hillgruber considers the defense of the German Reich, and its territorial integrity in the East during the final phrase of the war, to have been justified. Moreover, Hillgruber evaluates the bitter defensive battle against the Soviet army on the Eastern Front as a tragic historical dilemma even through he recognizes its connection to the machinery of death at Auschwitz. In this way he affirms the ready nationalism of his own subjective perspective on the era. The choice of such a perspective contains, whether explicitly or not, a clear historiographic judgment: for the sake of the nation, the historian takes sides in a "dilemma" - against the victims of National Socialism.

By proceeding from the experiences and subjective feelings of the greater part of the German populace to arrive at his paradigm of national identification, Hillgruber necessarily ignores the centrality of the phenomenon "Auschwitz" in his evaluation of National Socialism. Paradoxically, the conservative Hillgruber justifies his approach with what is usually considered a left-wing concern: the history of everyday life, or what might be called a locally oriented, close-up of National Socialism. This might seem surprising; but when applied to Nazism, a close-up perspective oriented towards the everyday experiences brings with it a depoliticizing, desubstantiating, structurally desubjectivizing effect.

In 1989, the American historian Dennis Bark and the Danish historian David Gress wrote in defense of Hillgruber:

Hillgruber made three simple, but historically very important points. One was that the annihilation of European Jews by the Nazis and the destruction of the German state were simultaneous, but not casually related: Germany's wartime enemies decided to mutilate and divide Germany long before they knew of the Holocaust, so that the fate of Germany was not intended as retribution for the Holocaust, but as general punishment of Germany. The second point was that these two events - the genocide of European Jewry and the destruction of German political power - even if causally unrelated, were a tragedy for Europe. Middle-class Jewish and German cultures were civilizing factors in the Central European area from the Baltic states in the north to Romania in the south, Hillgruber argued, and their destruction opened the way to domination of that area by the Soviet Union and other communist regimes. The disappearance of Germany as a cultural and political factor, and the Holocaust weakened European civilization as a whole by destroying its most important Central European component. Hillgruber's third point was that the German defeat in the East - the military events of 1944–1945 and their immediate consequences - was a subject worthy of study in its own right, and one which could be best studied from the perspective of those immediately involved; that is, the soldiers of the German army and the civilians who lost their homes, their families, and their friends in the course of those terrible months. Hillgruber did not deny that the German soldiers who defended to the last possible moment every inch of German territory in the East were also defending a brutal regime. But he added to this observation the equally important fact that there was an independent moral value to the defensive efforts, namely to allow as many civilians as possible to escape.

The British historian Richard J. Evans in his 1989 book In Hitler's Shadow attacked Hillgruber for taking the Eastern Front out of context, arguing that the Wehrmacht had been guilty of far worse crimes in the occupied areas of the Soviet Union than the Red Army was in the occupied areas of Germany. Evans wrote that "it was not the Soviet Army which adhered to a fundamentally barbarous concept of war, but the German Army". Evans went on to argue that:

None of this of course excuses the conduct of the Soviet troops, the mass rape of German women, the looting and the plundering, the deportation and lengthy imprisonment in Russia of many German troops, or the unauthorized killing of many German civilians. But it has to be said that the conduct of the Red Army in Germany was by no means as barbarous as that of the German Army in Russia. The Russians did not deliberately lay waste whole towns and villages in Germany, nor did they systematically destroy whole communities during their occupation of German territory.

Evans argued against Hillgruber that though the expulsions of ethnic Germans from Eastern Europe was done in an extremely brutal manner that could not be defended, the basic aim of expelling the ethnic German population of Poland and Czechoslovakia was justified by the subversive role played by the German minorities before World War II. Evans wrote that Hillgruber was simply wrong when he claimed that the Polish government-in-exile in London had ambitions for annexing eastern Germany, and that the Poles were opposed to the west-ward expansion of their nation, preferring instead that Poland be restored to its pre-September 1939 borders. Evans wrote the decisions to expand Poland westward were taken by the British and the Americans as a way of compensating Poland for territory the Soviet Union planned to re-annex from Poland and as a way of seeking to persuade the Soviets to broaden the Lublin government. Evans argued that it was not true as Hillgruber had claimed that the expulsions of the Germans from Eastern Europe was caused by anti-German prejudices held by British and American leaders, but instead claimed that it was the behavior of ethnic German minorities during the inter-war period that led to the adoption of expulsion. Evans wrote that under the Weimar Republic the vast majority of ethnic Germans in Poland and Czechoslovakia made it clear that they were not loyal to the states they happened to live under, and under the Third Reich the German minorities in Eastern Europe were willing tools of German foreign policy. Evans asserted that Hillgruber was mistaken when he described pre-1945 eastern Germany as a "centuries-old area of German settlement", arguing that in many areas like Upper Silesia the German nature of the area was a result of forced Germanization in the Imperial period. Evans noted that even Hillgruber admitted that up to 1918 the German state had become increasingly harsh in its discrimination and oppression against non-German minorities. Evans wrote that many areas of Eastern Europe featured a jumble of various ethnic groups of which Germans were only one, and that it was the destructive role played by ethnic Germans as instruments of Nazi Germany that led to their expulsion after the war. Likewise, Evans argued that Hillgruber was totally wrong when he claimed that Allies had plans for partitioning Germany during the war. Evans wrote that the Allies had a number of possible plans for Germany after the war, none of which were ever adopted as policy, and the division of Germany was a product of the Cold War, not of any plans made during World War II.

Evans noted that through Hillgruber always used the words "destruction" and "murder" to describe the Shoah in his Holocaust essay, Habermas had through the "unfair example" of the sub-title of Hillgruber's book made a valid point. Evans wrote that in his Holocaust essay, Hillgruber wrote in a cold and detached tone to describe the "Final Solution" which was a very marked contrast to the passionate and angry tone of the essay dealing with Germany's defeat. Likewise, Evans attacked Hillgruber for focusing too much on Hitler as an explanation for the Holocaust. Evans claimed that Hillgruber was being highly misleading in claiming that the other Nazi leaders were "apolitical", and instead asserted that all of the Nazi leaders were fanatically anti-Semitic. Evans maintained that Hillgruber by treating the Holocaust as something caused entirely by Hitler ignored the central role played by the German Army, the civil service, and Junkers as agents of the "Final Solution". Despite this criticism, Evans wrote against Habermas that "no serious reading" of Hillgruber's essay could support the claim that Hitler had forced the Holocaust "against the will" of the other Nazi leaders. Evans wrote against Hillgruber's claim that anti-Semitism in Imperial Germany was not so bad as proven by the electoral collapse of the Völkisch parties in the 1912 Reichstag elections, that Hillgruber ignored the fact that the collapse of the völkisch parties was caused by the "mainstream" parties like the Catholic Centre and the Conservatives incorporating völkisch anti-Semitism into their platforms. Likewise, Evans maintained that Hillgruber had ignored the widespread popularity of völkisch anti-Semitic, eugenic and Social Darwinist ideas in Germany in the 1880s-1890s, which may not have had an immediate political impact at the time, but did provide the intellectual atmosphere which made the Third Reich possible. Evans took the view that Hillgruber had totally discredited himself in the Historikerstreit, and that his reputation as a scholar was in tatters.

In an April 1990 essay entitled "On Emplotment - Andreas Hillgruber", the British Marxist theorist Perry Anderson wrote against Evans in support of Hillgruber that Evans's distinction between the justified aim of expelling the German minorities and the unjustified way this was accomplished was untenable. Against Evans, Anderson wrote that Hillgruber was right when he claimed that General Władysław Sikorski and other leading Polish politicians supported by Churchill wished to annex East Prussia, Silesia and Pomerania from 1940 onwards. As part of his defense of Hillgruber, Anderson claimed that in the lands lost by Poland to the Soviet Union, ethnic Poles were 30% of the population while in the lands gained by Poland at Germany's expense, Germans were 90% of the population. Anderson wrote that Hillgruber was correct when he claimed that "traditional imperial interests" instead of concerns with "universal values" drove Allied policy towards the Germans in 1945. Anderson wrote that Hillgruber "deserved respect" for his longing for the lost Heimat of East Prussia, stating Hillgruber had been born and grew up in East Prussia, a place that he deeply loved that now literally no longer existed, and to which he could never return to. In support of Hillgruber's claim that it was a tragedy that Germany had ceased to play its traditional "Land in the Middle" role after 1945, Anderson argued Germany's position in Central Europe had historically played a central role in German national identity, and that Hillgruber was correct to moan its absence. Anderson wrote:

Hillgruber died in May 1989. In November the Berlin Wall was breached. Today, less than a year later [Anderson was writing in April 1990], German reunification is at hand. Hillgruber, a conservative, saw things more lucidly than his liberal critics. The reunion of Germany will indeed involve the reemergence of a Central Europe already in statu nascendi; and the reconstruction of Central Europe will all but certainly restore independence to Europe as a whole, in the wider theatre of the world. To have asserted these connexions so clearly, on the eve of their historical realization, was not an inconsiderable achievement.

Anderson claimed that it was hard to argue against Hillgruber's point that the Holocaust was only one chapter in the wider history of horror in the 20th century. Anderson praised Hillgruber as the first historian who traced how the plans for an extensive Eastern empire for Germany unveiled in the summer of 1916 by Paul von Hindenburg and Erich Ludendorff evolved 25 years later into genocidal reality by the summer of 1941. Despite some sympathy for Hillgruber, Anderson was more critical of other aspects of Zweierlei Untergang. Anderson argued that Hillgruber's condemnation of the putsch attempt of 20 July 1944, as irresponsible and his claim that having World War II go on to May 1945 was "justified" by allowing 2 million German civilians to escape West and another 2 million German soldiers to surrender to the Western Allies instead of the Soviets was entirely mistaken. Anderson wrote that the one million German soldiers killed between the summer of 1944 and the spring of 1945, to say nothing of the Allied dead and wounded, German civilians killed by Allied bombing, those killed in the Holocaust and other victims of Nazi terror simply invalidated Hillgruber's claim about the benefits of World War II going on until May 1945. Anderson noted that Hillgruber's demand for "identification" with German troops on the Eastern Front reflected his own personal background as an infantryman who fought in East Prussia in 1945, and argued that Hillgruber had no right to try to impose his own personal preferences on other historians. Moreover, Anderson commented that in his Holocaust essay, Hillgruber made no demands for "identification" with the victims of the Holocaust Anderson concluded:

Scrutiny of Zweierlei Untergang reveals, then, a series of complexities. Hillgruber was a nationalist historian, but he was not an apologist of National Socialism. The device of collatio did not in itself dictate a diminution of the Final Solution. Nor did Hillgruber's treatment of the destruction of European Jewry as such contribute to one. But any juxtaposition of Jewish and German fates demanded an exceptional - moral and empirical - delicacy that was beyond the compass of this historian. In its absence, the laconic could not but seem insensible. For its part, colored by personal memory, Hillgruber's obituary of the German East was of divided validity too: its counter-factual assessment of the conspiracy of July 1944 groundless, its factual verdict on the expulsions of 1945-47 well-grounded. Finally, Hillgruber's projection of Central Europe as the common scene, and victim, of the tragedies he related, signally failed to situate the Jews historically within it; but political in impulse, it captured the current position of the Germans, and some of its possible consequences, remarkable well. All of this, in its mixture of acuteness and obtuseness, fallacies and foresights, is quite normal for a historian.

The American historian Peter Baldwin in the 1990 book Reworking the Past commented on the cold and clinical way in which Hillgruber spoke of the Holocaust in contrast to his passionate anger about the fate of the Germans killed or expelled in 1945–1946. Baldwin went on to note that, although Hillgruber claimed that both the Holocaust and the expulsion of the Germans were equally tragic events, his tone betrayed which one he really regarded as the greater tragedy. The Australian historian Richard Bosworth called Zweierlei Untergang an "elegy" for the "lost province" of East Prussia, in which Hillgruber was born and grew up in, and whose end in 1945 Hillgruber described in gruesome detail.

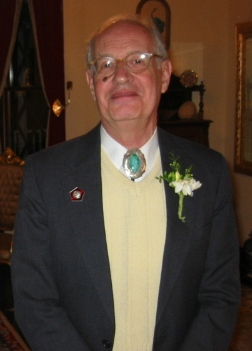
The American historian Gerhard Weinberg

In 1991, the British military historian Christopher Duffy wrote that Hillgruber had set out a "formidable challenge" for historians in Zweierlei Untergang with his demand that historians write a history of the Eastern Front that paid special cognition to the end of the "German East" Duffy stated his book Red Storm on the Reich was an attempt to write the sort of history Hillgruber had demanded In 1992, the Israeli historian Omer Bartov wrote that Hillgruber was one of the three leaders of the "new revisionism" in German history that sparked the Historikerstreit of the late 1980s, who were all in some ways seeking to promote the image of the Wehrmacht as a force for the good by downplaying Wehrmacht war crimes, and seeking to portray the Wehrmacht as a victim of the Allies rather the victimizer of the peoples of Europe, writing of "...the bizarre inversion of the Wehrmacht's roles proposed by all three exponents of the new revisionism, whereby overtly or by implication the Army is transformed from culprit to saviour, from an object of hatred and fear to one of empathy and pity, from victimizer to victim". Specially, Bartov noted that for:

- That Michael Stürmer's geographical interpretation of German history meant that Germany's "mission" in Central Europe was to serve as a bulwark against the Slavic menace from the East in both World Wars.
- That Ernst Nolte's argument about a "casual nexus" with the National Socialist genocide as a logical, if extreme response to the horrors of Communism led to Wehrmacht crimes in the Soviet Union being portrayed as essentially justified. This was even more the case as Nolte insisted that Operation Barbarossa was as Hitler claimed a "preventive war", which meant that for Nolte Wehrmacht war crimes were portrayed as a defensive response to the threat posed to Germany by the "Asiatic hordes".
- That Hillgruber's call for historians to "identity" and "empathize" with German troops fighting on the Eastern Front in 1944–1945 implicitly devalued the lives of those suffering and dying in the Holocaust, which was allowed to continue in part because the German troops held out for so long.

Bartov wrote that all three historians had in varying ways sought to justify and excuse Wehrmacht war crimes by depicting the Wehrmacht as engaging in a heroic battle for Western civilization, often using the same language as the Nazis such as referring to the Red Army as the "Asiatic hordes". Bartov ended that these sorts of arguments reflected a broader unwillingness of the part of some Germans to admit to what their Army did during the war.

The American historian Deborah Lipstadt in her 1993 book Denying the Holocaust accused Hillgruber of being a grossly offensive German apologist with his claim that the Holocaust and the end of Germany as a great power were equally great tragedies that "belonged together". Lipstadt wrote that she regarded Hillgruber as guilty of a moral relativism with his call for historians to "identify" with German soldiers on the Eastern Front that consciously down-played Jewish suffering and the Jewish dead of the Holocaust while falsely elevating German suffering and the German dead to the same level. In his 1994 book A World At Arms, Hillgruber's old adversary Gerhard Weinberg called Hillgruber's thesis in Zweierlei Untergang "...a preposterous reversal of the realities". Weinberg sarcastically commented that if the German Army had held out longer against the Allies in 1945 as Hillgruber had wished, the result would not have been the saving of more German lives as Hillgruber had claimed, but rather an American atomic bombing of Germany.

In a 1998 essay, the Israeli historian Yehuda Bauer called Hillgruber as a "great German historian" who "unfortunately" in the 1980s "unwittingly" and "unwillingly" allowed himself to be associated with the fraction of German historians centered on Ernst Nolte. Bauer went on to praise Hillgruber as a way of rebutting Arno J. Mayer as the historian who proved in his 1972 essay "`Die Endlösung' und das deutsche Ostimperium als Kernstück des rassenideologische Programms des Nationsozialismus" (The 'Final Solution' and the German Eastern Imperium as the Nucleus of the National Socialist Racial-Ideological Program) that in National Socialism Communism was viewed as an instrument of the Jews, and thus contra Mayer that Nazi anti-Communism was most definitely subordinated to anti-Semitism.

The British historian Sir Ian Kershaw in the 2000 edition of his book The Nazi Dictatorship argued that Hillgruber's approach was flawed as it was based on the assumption that to "understand" a period in history required one to "identify" with one side or the other. Kershaw wrote:

It was precisely the claim that the historians' only valid position is one of identification with the German troops fighting on the Eastern Front which invoked such widespread and vehement criticism of Hillgruber's essay. The critical method, which in his other work - not excluding his essay on "The Historical Place of the Extermination of the Jews" in the same volume as the controversial treatment of the Eastern Front - made him a formidable historian whose strength lay in the careful and measured treatment of empirical data, entirely deserted him here and was wholly lacking in this one-sided, uncritical, empathizing with the German troops.

The American historian Kriss Ravetto noted that Hillgruber's picture of the Red Army as the "Asiatic hordes" who personified sexual barbarism and his use of "flooding" and body penetration imagery seemed to invoke traditional Yellow Peril stereotypes, especially the fear of a ravenous, demasculinizing Asian sexuality threatening whites. In addition Hillgruber seemed to have a fear of an all-consuming Asian sexuality that was the alleged reason for the rapes of millions of German women by the Red Army in 1945, which perhaps reflected deep-settled personal anxieties of his own. The American historian Donald McKale in his 2002 book Hitler's Shadow War accused Hillgruber of writing the sort of nonsense one would expect from a German apologist with his claim that the Anglo-American strategic bombing offensive was an act of "genocide" against the German people, and thought especially offensive Hillgruber's comparison of the strategic bombing offensive with the Holocaust. McKale argued that historians like Hillgruber were trying to create a version of the German past that would allow Germans to get over the guilt caused by the Holocaust, and allow Germans to feel good about being German again.

The British historian Norman Davies in his 2006 book Europe at War 1939–1945: No Simple Victory appeared to lend Hillgruber some support by writing:

...Andreas Hillgruber published a book provocatively entitled Zweirelei Untergang or 'Double Ruin' (1986). The subject was the expulsion of Germans from the east in 1945-47. But the clear implication was that Germany had been victimized twice over - once by the military defeat and again by the expulsions. The explosion was immediate. Habermas and other left-wingers went into action with a flurry of articles and of letter-writing. They claimed that the uniqueness of the Holocaust was under attack. They disliked comparisons, particularly between the tragedy of the Jews and the misfortunes of the Germans.

Davies went to argue that revelations made after the fall of Communism in Eastern Europe in 1989-91 supported Hillgruber's moral equating of National Socialism and Communism. The British economic historian Adam Tooze in his 2006 book The Wages of Destruction wrote his interpretation of German foreign policy owed much to Hillgruber's "monumental" book Hitlers Strategie (Hitler's Strategy). Tooze added that he felt that the Historikerstreit had the unfortunate effect of obscuring the "immense contribution" Hillgruber had made to "...our understanding of the Third Reich".

His defenders have argued that his work shows that World War II is more morally complex than it is usually presented, and that he was merely highlighting a little-known chapter of history. More importantly however, Hillgruber's historical method of "comparing" was considered by many to be "equating". This is the same criticism Ernst Nolte had faced, during the Historians' Debate.

== Works ==
- Hitler, König Carol und Marschall Antonesu: die deutsch-rumänischen Beziehungen, 1938–1944 (Hitler, King Carol and Marshal Antonesu: the German-Romanian Relationship, 1938–1944), 1954.
- co-written with Hans-Günther Seraphim "Hitlers Entschluss zum Angriff auf Russland (Eine Entgegnung)" (Hitler's Decision for the Attack on Russia: A Reply) pp. 240–254 from Vierteljahrshefte für Zeitgeschichte, Volume 2, 1954.
- Hitlers Strategie: Politik und Kriegsführung, 1940–1941, (Hitler's Strategy: Politics and War Leadership, 1940–1941) 1965.
- "Riezlers Theorie des kalkulierten Risikos und Bethmann Hollwegs politische Konzeption in der Julikrise 1914" (Riezler's Theory of the Calculated Risk and Bethmann Hollweg's Political Conception in the July Crisis 1914") pp. 333–351 from Historische Zeitschrift, Volume 202, 1966.
- Deutschlands Rolle in der Vorgeschichte der beiden Weltkriege, 1967; translated into English by William C. Kirby as Germany And The Two World Wars, Harvard University Press, 1981. ISBN 978-0-674-35321-3
- Kontinuität und Diskontinuität in der deutschen Aussenpolitik von Bismarck bis Hitler (Continuity and Discontinuity in German Foreign Policy from Bismarck to Hitler), 1969.
- Bismarcks Aussenpolitik (Bismarck's Foreign Policy), 1972.
- "`Die Endlösung' und das deutsche Ostimperium als Kernstück des rassenideologische Programms des Nationsozialismus" (The 'Final Solution' and the German Empire in the East as the Core of National Socialism's Race-based Ideological Program) pp. 133–153 from Vierteljahrshefte für Zeitgeschichte, Volume 20, 1972.
- Deutsche Geschichte, 1945-1972: Die "Deutsche Frage" in der Weltpolitik (German History, 1945-1972: The "German Question" in World Politics), 1974.
- "England's Place In Hitler's Plans for World Dominion" pp. 5–22 from Journal of Contemporary History, Volume 9, 1974.
- Deutsche Grossmacht-und Weltpolitik im 19. und 20. Jahrhundert (German Great-and Global-Power Policy during the 19th and 20th Centuries), 1977.
- Otto von Bismarck: Gründer der europäischen Grossmacht Deutsches Reich (Otto von Bismarck: Founder of the European Great Power, the German Reich), 1978.
- "Tendenzen, Ergebnisse und Perspektiven der gegenwärtigen Hitler-Forschung" (Tendencies, Results And Perspectives Of The Present Hitler Research) pp. 600–621 from Historische Zeitschrift, Volume 226, June 1978.
- Europa in der Weltpolitik der Nachkriegszeit (1945–1963) (Europe in World Politics during the Postwar Period, (1945–63)), 1979.
- Sowjetische Aussenpolitik im Zweiten Weltkrieg (Soviet Foreign Policy in World War Two), 1979.
- Die gescheiterte Grossmacht: Eine Skizze des Deutschen Reiches, 1871–1945 (The Failed Great Power: A Sketch of the German Reich, 1871–1945), 1980.
- co-written with Klaus Hildebrand Kalkül zwischen Macht und Ideologie. Der Hitler- Stalin-Pakt: Parallelen bis heute? (Calculation Between Power And Ideology The Hitler-Stalin Pact: Parallels to Today?), 1980, ISBN 978-3-7201-5125-2.
- Der Zweite Weltkrieg, 1939-1945: Kriegsziele und Strategie der grossen Mächte (The Second World War, 1939-1945: War Aims and Strategy of the Great Powers), 1982.
- "Noch einmal: Hitlers Wendung gegen die Sowjetunion 1940" pp. 214–226 from Geschichte in Wissenschaft und Unterricht, Volume 33, 1982.
- Die Last der Nation: Fünf Beiträge über Deutschland und die Deutschen (The Burden of the Nation: Five Contributions about Germany and the Germans), 1984.
- "The Extermination of the European Jews in Its Historical Context—a Recapitulation," pp. 1–15 from Yad Vashem Studies Volume 17, 1986.
- "Hitler und die USA" (Hitler and the USA) pp. 27–41 from Deutschland und die USA 1890-1985 (Germany and the USA 1890-1985) edited by D. Junker, 1986.
- Zweierlei Untergang: Die Zerschlagung des Deutschen Reiches und das Ende des europäischen Judentums (Two Kinds of Ruin: The Fall of the German Reich and the End of European Jewry), 1986.
- Die Zerstörung Europas: Beiträge zur Weltkriegsepoche 1914 bis 1945 (The Destruction of Europe: Contributions on the Epoch of World Wars, 1914 to 1945), 1988.
- "War in the East and the Extermination of the Jews" pp. 85–114 from The Nazi Holocaust Part 3, The "Final Solution": The Implementation of Mass Murder Volume 1 edited by Michael Marrus, Mecler: Westpoint, CT 1989.
- "No Questions are Forbidden To Research" pp. 155–161; "Letter to the Editor of the Frankfurter Allgemeine Zeitung, 29 November 1986" p. 198; "Jürgen Habermas, Karl-Heinz Janßen, and the Enlightenment in the Year 1986" pp. 222–236 & "My Concluding Remarks on the So-Called Historikerstreit, 12 May 1987" pp. 268–269 from Forever In The Shadow Of Hitler?: Original Documents Of the Historikerstreit, The Controversy Concerning The Singularity Of The Holocaust edited by Ernst Piper, Atlantic Highlands, NJ: Humanities Press, 1993, ISBN 978-0-391-03784-7.
- "The Persecution of the Jews: Its place in German History" pp. 280–286 from Current research on antisemitism edited by Herbert A. Strauss and Werner Bergmann, Berlin: Walter de Gruyter, 1993.

== See also ==
- List of Adolf Hitler books
- List of books about Nazi Germany
