= Arnold Gehlen =

German philosopher, sociologist and anthropologist (1904–1976)

Arnold Gehlen (German: [ˈɡeːlən]; 29 January 1904, Leipzig, German Empire – 30 January 1976, Hamburg, West Germany) was an influential conservative German philosopher, sociologist, and anthropologist.

== Biography ==
Gehlen's major influences while studying philosophy were Hans Driesch, Nicolai Hartmann and especially Max Scheler. Furthermore, he was heavily influenced by Immanuel Kant, Arthur Schopenhauer and US-American pragmatism: Charles Sanders Peirce, William James and especially George Herbert Mead.

In 1933 Gehlen signed the "Vow of allegiance of the Professors of the German Universities and High-Schools to Adolf Hitler and the National Socialistic State". Although he joined the Nazi Party in 1933 and made a career as a member of the 'Leipzig School' under Hans Freyer, he was a political opportunist: his main work Der Mensch appeared in 1940 and was published in English translation in 1987 as Man. His Nature and Place in the World. Gehlen was a modernist conservative who accepted the cultural changes brought about by the industrial revolution and by mass society (see his Man in the Age of Technology, Chapter V).

Gehlen succeeded Paul Tillich, who emigrated to the U.S., at the University of Frankfurt. In 1938 he accepted a teaching position at the University of Königsberg (today's Kaliningrad) and then taught at the University of Vienna in 1940 until he was drafted into the Wehrmacht in 1943. After undergoing denazification he taught at the administrative college in Speyer. He went on to teach at the RWTH Aachen University between 1962 and 1969. Gehlen became a sharp critic of the protest movements that developed in the late 1960s.

He was the cousin of Reinhard Gehlen, the founder and president of the West German Federal Intelligence Service.

== Main ideas ==
Gehlen's core idea in Man is that humans have unique properties which distinguish them from all other species: world-openness (Weltoffenheit), a concept originally coined by Max Scheler, which describes the ability of humans to adapt to various environments as contrasted with animals, which can only survive in environments which match their evolutionary specialisation. This world-openness gives us the ability to shape our environment according to our intentions, and it comprises a view of language as a way of acting (Gehlen was one of the first proponents of speech act theory), an excess of impulses and the ability of self-control. These properties allow us—in contrast to all other animals—to create our own (for example cultural) environments, though this is also at the risk of a certain self-destabilisation. Gehlen's philosophy has influenced many contemporary German thinkers in a range of disciplines, including Peter L. Berger, Thomas Luckmann and Niklas Luhmann in sociology, and Hans Blumenberg in philosophy. Since the mid-2010s, there has occurred a Gehlen revival based in part on the predictions in his book Moral und Hypermoral as concerns the development of German (and Western) politics from 1969. Two examples of his work - "On culture, nature and naturalness" and "Man and Institutions" - are included in the anthology of conservative social and political thought published by Jerry Z. Muller in 1997.

=== Post-histoire ===
As early as 1952 Gehlen adopted the expression post-histoire from the writings of Paul de Man's uncle, Hendrik de Man, a Belgian socialist thinker who later became a Nazi collaborator. He first used the term to designate an epoch characterized by a state of stability and rigidity, devoid of utopian ideas, change, or development. In 1961, in an article appropriately entitled Über kulturelle Kristallisation (lit. "On Cultural Crystallization"), Gehlen wrote: "I am predicting that the history of ideas has come to an end and that we have arrived at the epoch of post-histoire, so that now the advice Gottfried Benn gave the individual, 'Make do with what you have,' is valid for humanity as a whole".

== Selected writings ==
- Der Mensch. Seine Natur und seine Stellung in der Welt. (1940) (Translated as Man: His Nature and Place in the World, Columbia University Press, 1987)
- Urmensch und Spätkultur. Philosophische Ergebnisse und Aussagen. (1956)
- Die Seele im technischen Zeitalter. (1949, rev. 1957) (Translated as Man in the Age of Technology)
- Moral und Hypermoral. Eine pluralistische Ethik. (1969) (Available in Webarchive)
- Zeit-Bilder. Zur Soziologie und Ästhetik der modernen Malerei. (1960)

== See also ==
- Philosophical anthropology
- Postmodernism
