= Man in the Age of Technology =

1949 book by Arnold Gehlen

- Author: Arnold Gehlen
- Original title: Die Seele im technischen Zeitalter
- Translator: Patricia Lipscomb
- Language: German
- Publication date: 1949
- Publication place: West Germany
- English publication date: 1980

Man in the Age of Technology (German: Die Seele im technischen Zeitalter. Sozialpsychologische Problem in der industriellen Gesellschaft, lit. 'The Soul in the Technical Age: Socio-psychological Problems in the Industrial Society') is a book by the German philosopher Arnold Gehlen, first published in 1949 and revised and expanded in 1957.

== Summary ==
Arnold Gehlen analyses technology and how it impacts social life from an anthropological perspective. He also draws from philosophy and biology, and provides illustrative examples from literature and art.

== Publication ==
A first version of the book was published in 1949. Gehlen made a revised and expanded version which was published in 1957. The book was published in English translation by Patricia Lipscomb in 1980. It was the first of Gehlen's works to appear in English.

== Reception ==
Man in the Age of Technology was Gehlen's best selling work. At the time of his death in 1976, 15 German editions had been published and 106,000 copies had been sold. It is considered a classic in philosophy of technology.

When Man in the Age of Technology was published in English, Andreas Huyssen argued that the "conservative European Kulturkritik" it is rooted in had been superseded by the Frankfurt School, structuralism and post-structuralism, but the fact that writers from those traditions kept directing criticism at Gehlen "shows that Gehlen's analysis can still serve as a major reference point for contemporary debates", and Man in the Age of Technology "may contribute significantly to the ongoing debate about the impact of modern technology on the human psyche and on the culture of modernity". Robert John wrote in the Mid-American Review of Sociology that the book's message "has not lost its relevance for contemporary Western culture", and concerns "a theme that American 'conservatives' rarely address outside of a narrow political-economic context".
