= Man: His Nature and Place in the World =

1940 book by Arnold Gehlen

Man
- Author: Arnold Gehlen
- Original title: Der Mensch
- Translator: Clare McMillan; Karl Pillemer
- Language: German
- Publisher: Junker und Dünnhaupt
- Publication date: 1940
- Publication place: Germany
- English publication date: 1987
- Pages: 471

Man: His Nature and Place in the World (German: Der Mensch. Seine Natur und seine Stellung in der Welt) is a 1940 book by the German philosopher Arnold Gehlen.

== Summary ==
A work of philosophical anthropology, Man: His Nature and Place in the World attemps to find a unified structure that can describe the place of humans in the world. Gehlen focused on self-preservation and action. He characterised man as a Mängelwesen (lit. 'deficiencies being'), with which he meant that human biology alone is not enough for survival, and human culture has become a necessary compensation.

== Publication ==
Man: His Nature and Place in the World was first published in German by Junker und Dünnhaupt in 1940. Gehlen revised the book in 1944 and 1950. It appeared in English translation through Columbia University Press in 1987.

== Reception ==
The book contributed significantly to the establishment and impact of philosophical anthropology as a discipline. Josef Tewes wrote in Kindlers literature encyclopedia in 2020 that, through its focus on self-preservation, the book follows Friedrich Schiller and Johann Gottfried Herder in its view of mankind, and, through its emphasis on deficiency, it rejects views held by Aristotle, Max Scheler and many others, where humans are seen as a culmination of living beings.
