= Moral und Hypermoral =

1969 book by Arnold Gehlen

Moral und Hypermoral. Eine pluralistische Ethik
- Author: Arnold Gehlen
- Language: Germany
- Subject: Ethics
- Publisher: Athenäum Verlag
- Publication date: 1969
- Publication place: West Germany
- Pages: 192

Moral und Hypermoral. Eine pluralistische Ethik (lit. 'Moral and Hypermoral: A Pluralist Ethic') is a book about ethics by the German philosopher Arnold Gehlen, first published in 1969. It combines anthropology, behavioral science and sociology and identifies four interdependent forms of ethics: reciprocity, instinctive regulations, family-related ethical behaviour and its extensions, and the ethos of the institutions. It was Gehlen's last book.
