= Jerry Z. Muller =

American historian

Jerry Z. Muller is an American historian. He is professor emeritus of history at the Catholic University of America.

== Books ==
- The Other God that Failed: Hans Freyer and the Deradicalization of German Conservatism (Princeton University Press, 1987)
- Adam Smith in His Time and Ours: Designing the Decent Society (The Free Press, 1993)
- Conservatism: An Anthology of Social and Political Thought From David Hume to the Present (Princeton University Press, 1997)
- The Mind and the Market: Capitalism in Modern European Thought (Knopf, 2002)
- Capitalism and the Jews (Princeton University Press, 2010)
- The Tyranny of Metrics (Princeton University Press, 2018)
- Professor of Apocalypse: The Many Lives of Jacob Taubes (Princeton University Press, 2022)
