= 1932 Prussian coup d'état =

Takeover by German chancellor von Papen

- Part of failure of Weimar Republic
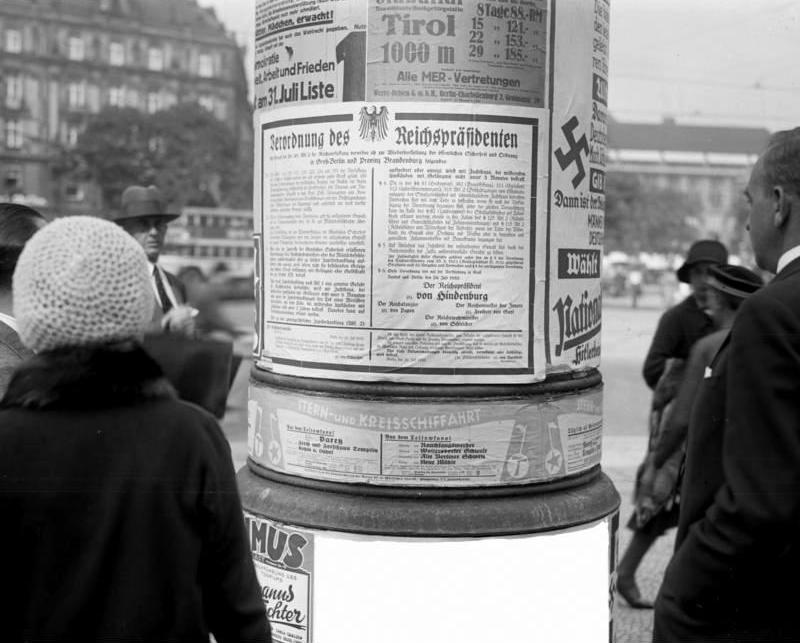
- The Emergency Decree of President von Hindenburg (Berlin, July 1932)
- Date: 20 July 1932
- Location: Prussia
- Caused by: Growth of political extremism; 1932 Prussian state election
- Goals: Future restoration of monarchy
- Methods: Reichsexekution
- Result: Reich victory: Prussia brought under direct rule; von Papen installed as Reichskommissar; End of democracy in Prussia

Parties
German Reich	Prussia

Lead figures
Paul von Hindenburg; Franz von Papen; Kurt von Schleicher	Otto Braun; Carl Severing

The 1932 Prussian coup d'état or Preußenschlag (German pronunciation: [ˈpʁɔʏsənˌʃlaːk]; lit. 'Prussian hit') took place on 20 July 1932, when Reich President Paul von Hindenburg, at the request of Franz von Papen, then Reich Chancellor of Germany, replaced the legal government of the Free State of Prussia with von Papen as Reich Commissioner. A second decree the same day transferred executive power in Prussia to the Reich Minister of the Armed Forces Kurt von Schleicher and restricted fundamental rights.

Papen had two rationales for the coup. One was that the 1932 Prussian state election had left a divided parliament with no viable possibilities for a coalition. This led to a caretaker government under the coalition that had held power before the election, with no clear path to replacing it with a new governing coalition. The second and major rationale was that in parts of Prussia there were violent street demonstrations and clashes taking place that Papen said the caretaker government could not control.

The immediate result was elimination of the last resistance in Prussia to Papen's attempt to establish a "New State", essentially a precursor to a restored monarchy. However, the coup also weakened the federalist Constitution of the Weimar Republic and ultimately facilitated the centralization of the Reich under Adolf Hitler after he was appointed chancellor in January 1933.

== Historical context ==
=== Discussions about a reorganization of the Reich ===
Since the late 1920s the relationship between the Reich and Prussia had been the subject of discussion by the League for the Renewal of the Reich (Bund zur Erneuerung des Reiches), a group to which von Papen belonged. The aim of the circle, often called the Luther League after its founder Hans Luther, a former Reich chancellor and president of the Reichsbank (1930–1933), was to strengthen the Reich's central power, reorganize northern Germany, especially Prussia, which was by far the largest state in Germany, and create an authoritarian presidential regime. The program included having the Reich president, the Reich government and the Reichstag replace the Prussian government and parliament, and empowering the chancellor to appoint provincial commissioners. It was assumed that Prussia, contrary to the interest of the entire nation, was as a state pursuing hegemony within the existing national structure. A comprehensive segmentation and disempowerment was proposed.

In 1928 a conference of the states, consisting of members of the Reich cabinet and all of the state minister presidents, came to the joint resolution that the relationship between the Reich and the states in the Republic was unsatisfactory and in need of fundamental reform, and that a "strong Reich power" was necessary. A constitutional committee was appointed to draw up workable proposals for constitutional and administrative reform and for prudent financial management.

On 21 June 1930 the assessments were presented. The four main points as laid out by the architect of the reform plan Arnold Brecht, then Ministerial Director of the Prussian State Chancellery and later the main representative of the Prussian government in the lawsuit against the emergency decree, were as follows:

- unite the central administration of the Prussian state government with the central administration of the Reich government
- unite the central authorities of the Prussian state government with those of the Reich
- eliminate Prussia as a state
- place the thirteen Prussian provinces, including Berlin, under the direct control of the Reich government as new states

The reform effort faced objections primarily from Bavaria and Prussia. Bavaria, the second largest state, objected because it feared that the proposal would immediately unify the northern German states while the south would gain only a reprieve from becoming part of a unified, non-federal Reich.

Political developments made implementation of the program impossible, but, as the political scientist Everhard Holtmann wrote, "core elements of the reform package, such as the abolition of Prussia's statehood, were [...] henceforth employed in a targeted manner in the domestic power struggle."

=== Papen's idea of a 'New State' ===
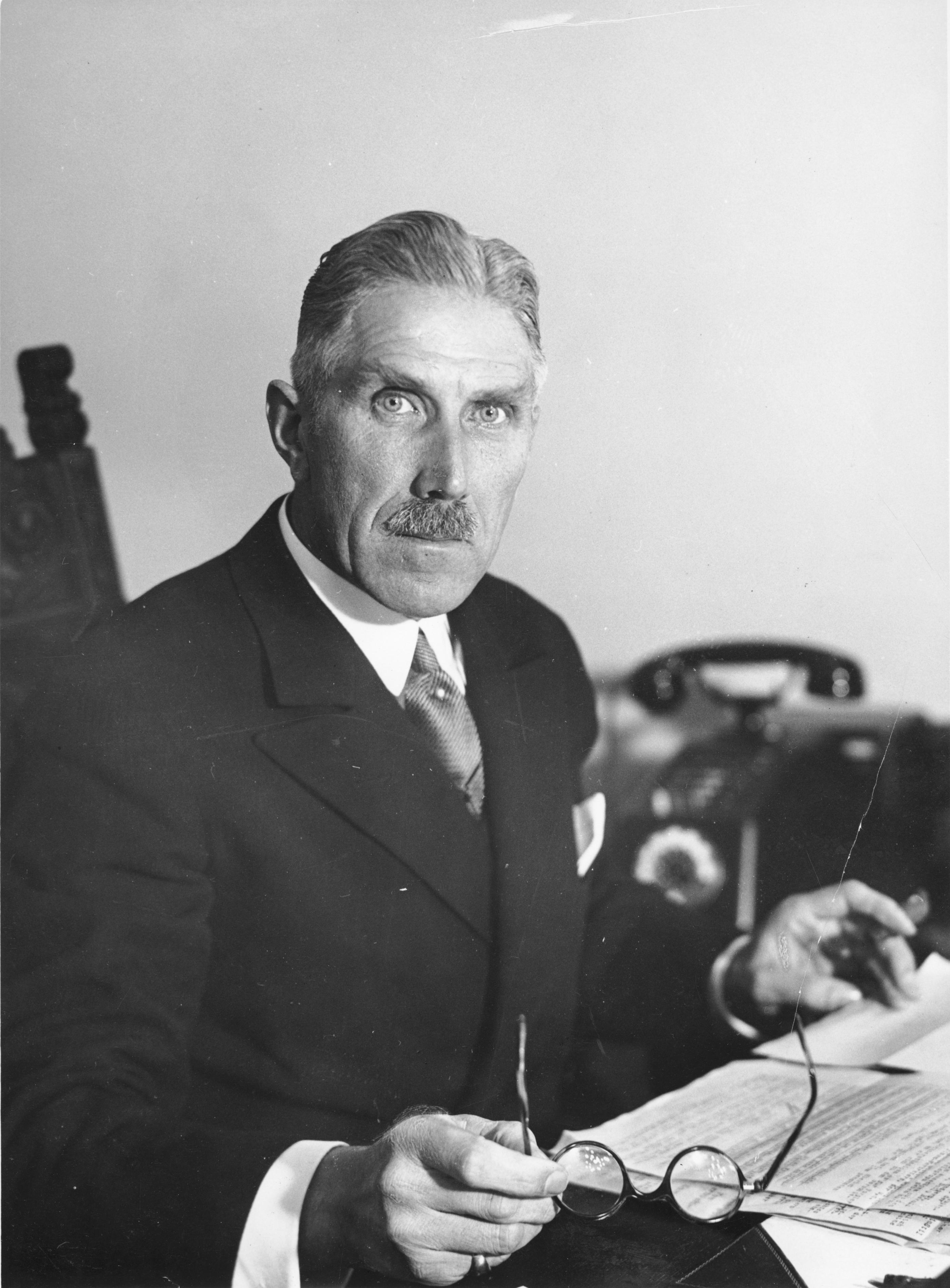
Franz von Papen

Papen's initiative for the Prussian coup is to be understood within the context of the plan for the establishment of a ‘New State’, a concept propagated above all by Walther Schotte – a journalist and historian who provided Papen with ideas and theories – and Edgar Jung, a lawyer and anti-democratic journalist. They did not favor the National Socialists but rather wanted to create the precursor to a monarchy, an authoritarian presidential regime with a chancellor dependent on the confidence of the president and a parliament severely limited in its rights, similar to the government under the constitution of the German Empire. Papen's long-term goal was to restore the Hohenzollern monarchy. The ‘New State’ was to stand above particularist interests and provide the necessary security, order, and tranquility for economic development.

== Situation in Prussia after the state elections of 24 April 1932 ==
The Free State of Prussia had been governed since 1920 by a stable coalition of the Social Democratic Party of Germany (SPD), the Catholic Centre Party and the German Democratic Party (DDP). In the 1932 Prussian state election of 24 April, the Nazi Party (NSDAP) won 162 seats and the Communist Party of Germany (KPD) 57, a total of 219 out of 423, or 52%. All other parties together won only 204 seats, or 48%. The NSDAP and KPD would not work together, and none of the other parties could form a government with a parliamentary majority without the support of one of the anti-democratic parties, something that none of them was willing to accept. That meant that after the formal resignation of the previous state government – the third cabinet of Otto Braun – it remained in office on a caretaker basis in accordance with Article 59 of the state constitution. With parliamentary rules having recently been changed to require an absolute majority for the election of a minister president, it was possible that the caretaker government could continue on indefinitely. The situation was similar to that in Bavaria, Saxony, Hesse, Württemberg and Hamburg, although the Reich government did not concern itself with them.

== Papen's and Hindenburg's approach ==
A center-right government in Prussia consisting of the NSDAP (162 seats) and the Centre Party (67 seats) with a 53% majority was technically possible. Together with the 31 seats of the nationalist-conservative German National People's Party (DNVP), the coalition would have had as many as 260 of 423 seats. Reich Chancellor von Papen sought such a coalition, but the NSDAP claimed power for itself alone. On 7 June 1932, Papen, although not formally authorized to do so, asked Hanns Kerrl, president of the state parliament and a member of the NSDAP, to replace the caretaker Prussian government with an elected one, something Kerrl was unable to guarantee due to the failure of coalition negotiations to that point.

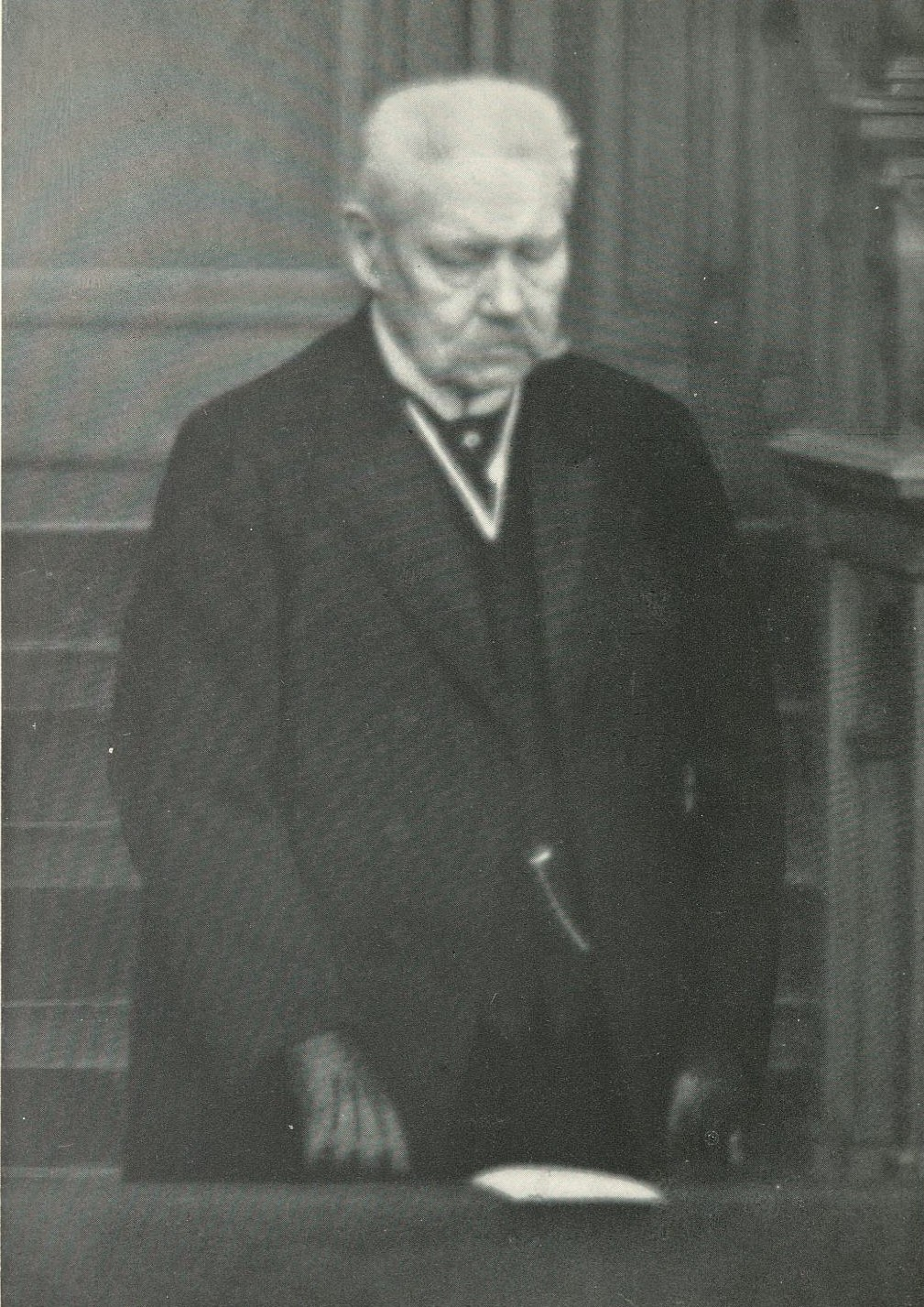
Paul von Hindenburg in 1931

As a result, Papen considered other possibilities. The first was to carry out the long-debated Reich reform which would have dissolved or divided Prussia. Because such a path would have achieved its goal only in the long term, was difficult to accomplish and highly controversial, he favored another option. He planned to appoint a Reich commissioner in place of the previous government and to enforce the new order, if necessary with the help of the Reichswehr.

For this he had certain precedents. Reich President Friedrich Ebert of the SPD had issued a Reich execution (Reichsexekution) – an intervention against an individual state led by the central government to enforce national law – during 1923's German October. In the face of Communist Party participation in democratically elected left-wing governments in Saxony and Thuringia, the forcible removal of the governments had been justified by the fact that peace and order were endangered in the two states.

Papen found an analogous justification for Prussia in the clashes culminating in the Altona Bloody Sunday of 17 July 1932 which involved the Nazi SA, which had just had the ban against it lifted by the Papen government, and the Communists and their supporters. The deadly confrontations and ensuing police action differed markedly from the Reich execution against Saxony in 1923. Then there had indeed been doubts about the loyalty of Saxony's left-wing government to the constitution and its willingness to take police action, but there was no question of this in Prussia's case.

Three days earlier, on 14 July, Reich President Paul von Hindenburg had at Papen's request signed an undated emergency decree pursuant to Article 48 of the Weimar Constitution, which allowed the Reich president, with the chancellor's co-signature, to take the necessary measures, including use of the military, to restore public security and order if they were endangered. By means of the decree Hindenburg authorized the Reich Chancellor to become Reich Commissioner for Prussia and enabled him to remove the caretaker Prussian government from office. By not dating the decree, Hindenburg left to Papen the choice of the time at which to make use of the power. Papen chose 20 July.

The third option, which would have consisted of waiting and leaving Prussia's caretaker minority government in office and trusting that it would get the situation under control even without a parliamentary majority, was one that Papen from the outset did not consider.

== Course of the coup ==
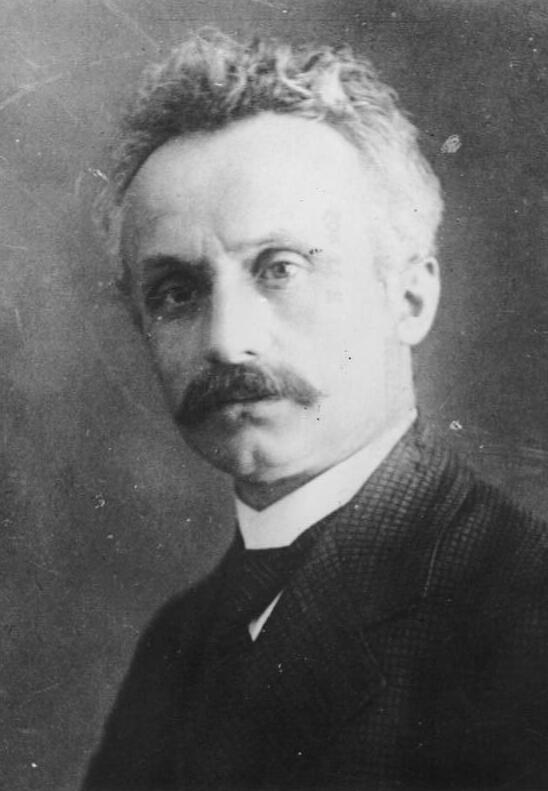
Carl Severing, 1919

On 20 July 1932, Prussia's Deputy Minister President Heinrich Hirtsiefer, in place of the acting but ill Minister President Otto Braun, along with Interior Minister Carl Severing and his colleague from the finance department Otto Klepper, went to see Papen at his request. Papen informed the constitutional ministers about the Hindenburg decree that allowed him to be installed as Reich commissioner and for the caretaker government to be removed. He said that the step was necessary because it appeared that "public safety and order in Prussia could no longer be guaranteed". A state of emergency was declared with immediate effect, and the Reichswehr minister was appointed as holder of executive power. Prussia's representatives objected to the coup saying that Prussia had not violated any of its responsibilities under the Reich constitution and its laws, and had done as much for security as the other states even though its jurisdiction included the areas of greatest unrest. The Braun government therefore challenged the constitutionality of the emergency decree. Severing responded negatively to Papen's suggestion that he voluntarily relinquish his official duties, saying that he would "yield only to force".

Otto Klepper reported a year later in an essay in the exile newspaper The New Journal that he had hoped that Severing would resist after he made his declaration, especially since both Papen and Interior Minister Wilhelm von Gayl, who was also present, had seemed very uncertain. "I suggested that we recess the meeting with Papen for an hour to discuss further action by the Prussian government and went to the door. But Severing declared that he had nothing more to discuss with me, and remained seated. Only then – after it was certain that no resistance was in the offing – was State Secretary Erwin Planck given the order to set the command to the Reichswehr in motion."

In the afternoon of the same day, Severing, who as interior minister commanded a force of 90,000 Prussian police officers, let himself be led out of his office and ministry by a delegation consisting of the police chief whom Papen had just appointed and two police officers. At 11:30 a.m. Papen had imposed a military state of emergency under the Reichswehr – a national force of 100,000 men – and, after the Prussian government backed down, occupied the Prussian Interior Ministry, the Berlin police headquarters and the headquarters of the Schutzpolizei (protective police).

The Berlin police chief Albert Grzesinski, his deputy Bernhard Weiß, and the commander of the protective police, the Centre Party politician Magnus Heimannsberg, were taken into custody and released the next day, after they had bound themselves in writing to engage in no more official acts. Immediately after the dismissal of the state government, a large-scale purge began. Numerous officials who had belonged to the previous coalition parties, especially the SPD, were put on temporary retirement and replaced by conservative officials, the majority of them German nationalists. This step, in addition to affecting the cabinet of Otto Braun, was directed especially against Social Democratic provincial presidents and leading Social Democrats within police organizations. Following a decree issued on 12 November 1932, those who had been placed on retirement were either dismissed or delegated to the provinces. In this way 69 ministerial officials with republican sentiments were sidelined. In addition to members of the Braun cabinet, they included among others Carl Steinhoff, vice-president of the province of East Prussia, and Carl Freter, district administrator of Calau in Brandenburg.

The purge continued well into 1933. With targeted interventions against the police, especially the political police, an essential part of the power apparatus in Prussia had already been "cleansed" before Adolf Hitler's chancellorship. There was hardly any resistance, mainly because the SPD's executive board had decided on 16 July not to resist with the resources available to it in order to avoid provoking a civil war.

== Members of the first commissioner's government ==
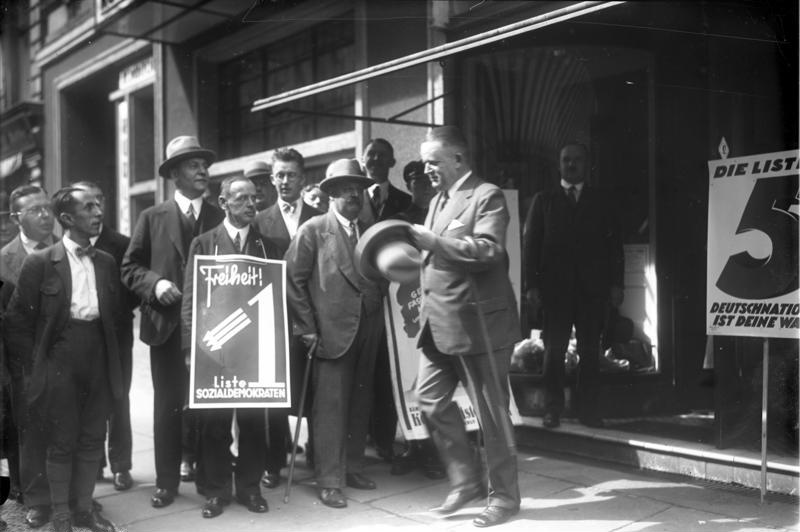
Franz Bracht (far right, holding hat), Berlin, 1932 Reichstag election

- Interior Ministry and Franz von Papen's Deputy Reich Commissioner and Deputy Reich Chancellor: Franz Bracht, former Lord Mayor of Essen
- Commerce: Friedrich Ernst, Reich Commissioner for Banking Supervision in Heinrich Brüning's cabinet
- Finance: Franz Schleusener, State Secretary in the Prussian Ministry of Finance
- Justice: Heinrich Hölscher, State Secretary in the Prussian Ministry of Justice
- Culture: Aloys Lammers, State Secretary in the Prussian Ministry of Science, Art and Education
- Agriculture: Fritz Mussehl, Ministerial Director in the Prussian Ministry of Agriculture
- Public Welfare: Adolf Scheidt, Ministerial Director in the Prussian Ministry of Welfare

== Reaction of the Prussian state government ==
Despite its previous declarations, the Prussian government refused to respond with violence of its own to the violence that the national emergency and emergency decree had officially sanctioned. Deployment of the Prussian police and the Reichsbanner Schwarz-Rot-Gold – an organization formed by three center and left of center parties to defend parliamentary democracy – was rejected. Even non-violent resistance in the form of a general strike was not considered because it did not seem feasible in view of the high unemployment during the Great Depression. There was also little prospect of success in a call for civil disobedience by civil servants. If open resistance were to occur, the government anticipated the outbreak of civil war, especially in the event of an armed clash between the Reichswehr and the state police, which it wanted to avoid at all costs. Moreover, legal recourse had not yet been exhausted.

Joseph Goebbels noted in his diary on 21 July: "The Reds have missed their great hour. It will never come again."

== Legal proceedings: Prussia contra Reich ==
=== Request for a preliminary injunction ===
On 21 July 1932 the Prussian government filed an application for a preliminary injunction and a constitutional complaint with the State Court for the German Reich (Staatsgerichtshof für das Deutsche Reich). The petitioners included the State of Prussia, represented by Arnold Brecht of the Prussian State Ministry, the parliamentary groups of the Social Democratic Party and the Centre Party in the Prussian Landtag, and also the states of Bavaria and Baden. They disputed the constitutionality of the decree on the grounds that Prussia was not ungovernable as presupposed in the decree. They therefore applied for a preliminary injunction to prohibit the appointed Reich commissioner from performing his duties. The application was rejected on 25 July 1932 because the court did not want to anticipate its final decision: in order to declare the emergency decree of the Reich president invalid, reasons would have to be brought forward that were not yet available to the court. The court stated in addition that a temporary injunction was only to be issued if it appeared necessary to avert substantial harm, but any harm Prussia might incur under the emergency decree could not be proven at the time.

=== Oral proceedings ===
In the stormy and highly publicized oral hearing, Arnold Brecht pointed out in defense of the State of Prussia that the civil war-like conditions in Prussia that led to the emergency decree had been ignited by the lifting of the ban on uniforms and on the SA on 14 June. The alleged "inner unfreedom" of the Prussian government had not existed, but that of the Reich government in its association with the National Socialists had. Brecht tried to prove that the Reich government, in agreement with the National Socialists, had purposefully worked towards removing the Prussian government from office with its preceding measures. In doing so, it had wanted to take the wind out of the National Socialists' sails.

Georg Gottheiner, an administrative lawyer and DNVP member, spoke as the main representative of the Reich government. He disputed Brecht's argumentation, saying that there had been no collusion with the National Socialists. Their "excitement" had built up precisely because of the Party's "one-sided treatment" by the Prussian government. Prussia had fought National Socialism and favored communism. The lifting of the SA ban was supposed to serve as an "outlet" for the Nazi's anger.

=== Court decision ===
In its examination of the existence of a significant disturbance or endangerment of public security and order, the State Court found that the government of Prussia was capable of acting and remained able to act assertively. Paragraph 1 of the emergency decree therefore did not apply: "In the event of a State not fulfilling the obligations imposed upon it by the Reich Constitution or by the laws of the Reich, the president of the Reich may make use of the armed forces to compel it to do so" (Article 48 of the Weimar Constitution).

The court found that the facts of paragraph 2 were present: "If public security and order are seriously disturbed or endangered ..., the president of the Reich may take measures necessary for their restoration, intervening if need be with the assistance of the armed forces" (Article 48). In the words of Richard Wienstein, who was ministerial councilor for constitutional and administrative law issues in the Reich chancellery:

The decree of the Reich president of 20 July 1932 for the restoration of public safety and order in the territory of the State of Prussia is compatible with the Reich Constitution insofar as it appoints the Reich chancellor as Reich commissioner for the State of Prussia and authorizes him to temporarily withdraw official powers from Prussian ministers and to assume these powers himself or to transfer them to other persons as commissioners of the Reich. The authorization, however, should not extend to depriving the Prussian State Ministry and its members of the representation of the State of Prussia in the Reichstag, the Reichsrat, or with respect to other states.

The cooperation between the Braun government and the Reich commissioner that was indirectly called for in the judgement was from the outset not possible. The Reich government overrode the provisions of the judgement and did not intend to return governmental power to the legitimate government after the commissioner's temporary work was completed.

The ruling partially justified both sides and preserved the dualism of Prussia and the Reich. Since the removal of the government was considered illegitimate, the restoration of the government should in fact have been called for. In the end, the court capitulated to the facts that had been created. The judgement basically tolerated a breach of the constitution because the court shied away from charging the Reich president with the act. Historian Michael Stolleis assessed the judgement as a "landmark in the constitutional history describing the downfall of the Republic. The commentators of the time sensed it, and it was seen as even more so from a distance."

=== Public reaction ===
According to historian Dirk Blasius' account, the verdict was perceived by almost everyone as either a welcome defeat or a clumsy failure of the Reich government. Only the press that supported the government called for an additional decisive step towards an authoritarian state. The "political passages" of the judgement were disseminated by most newspapers and prepared the ground for the later popular view that in a time of insecurity and disorder, emergency law had to be used to crack down.

Political scientist and historian Karl Dietrich Bracher in 1955 assessed the compromise verdict as one of "grotesque ambivalence", since its legal section upheld the Prussian point of view, "while its basic political tenor, with its acquiescence to what had already happened, accommodated the coup-like whim of a government that was propped up only by the authority of the Reich president and the power of the Reichswehr."

Carl Schmitt, who had represented Papen in the trial along with Erwin Jacobi and Carl Bilfinger, later endorsed the legality of the coup in an expert opinion.

== After the court ruling ==
Between the promulgation of the decree and the court ruling, Papen's provisional government replaced Prussia's top administrative and police officials.

The Braun government, rehabilitated in terms of state law but deprived of its real power, convened for its weekly cabinet meetings as a so-called "sovereign government". The true power, however, lay with the representatives of the Reich execution – the "Commissar Government" under Franz Bracht. It was not until Adolf Hitler seized power in 1933 that Hermann Göring, with Papen's help, secured a new emergency decree from Hindenburg that officially deposed Braun's "sovereign government". His response was again limited to filing a complaint with the State Constitutional Court on 7 February 1933.

== Text of the emergency decree of 20 July 1932 ==
Decree of the president of the Reich concerning the restoration of public safety and order in Greater Berlin and the Province of Brandenburg of 20 July 1932:

On the basis of Article 48 (1) and (2) of the Reich Constitution, I decree the following for the restoration of public safety and order in Greater Berlin and the Province of Brandenburg:

§ 1. Articles 114, 115, 117, 118, 123, 124 and 153 of the Constitution of the German Reich shall be suspended until further notice. Therefore, restrictions to personal freedom of the right to free expression of opinion including freedom of the press of the right of association and assembly; interference with the secrecy of correspondence, mail, telegraph and telephone; orders for house searches, and seizures and limitations of property are permissible outside the legal limits otherwise determined for them.

§ 2. Upon the promulgation of this decree, executive power shall pass to the Reich minister of defense, who may transfer it to military commanders. For the implementation of the measures necessary for the restoration of public safety, the entire protective police [Schutzpolizei] of the designated area shall be directly subordinated to the holder of executive power.

§ 3. Whoever contravenes orders issued by the Reich minister of defense or the military commanders in the interests of public safety or incites or encourages such contravention, shall be punished by imprisonment [Gefängnis (Note: The conditions in a Gefängnis were geared to the improvement of the offender and thus relatively more favorable for the inmates than the Zuchthaus.)] or a fine of up to 15,000 Reichsmarks, unless the existing laws provide for a higher penalty. Whoever causes a common danger to human life by an offence according to para. 1 shall be punished with imprisonment [Zuchthaus (Note: Zuchthaus was the most severe form of punishment and included stricter confinement and compulsory work for the inmates. It was also considered to be dishonoring.)], in extenuating circumstances with Gefängnis of not less than 6 months and, if the offence causes the loss of human life, with death, in extenuating circumstances with Zuchthaus of not less than 2 years. In addition, confiscation of property may be imposed. Any person who incites or encourages an offence dangerous to the public (para. 2) shall be punished by Zuchthaus, and in extenuating circumstances by Gefängnis for not less than 3 months.

§ 4. The crimes punishable by life imprisonment under Criminal Code §§ 81 (high treason), 302 (arson), 311 (explosion), 312 (flooding), 315 para. 2 (damage to railway installations) shall be punishable by death if committed after the enactment of the decree; under the same condition, the death penalty may be imposed in the case of Criminal Code § 92 (treason); likewise in the cases of § 125 para. 2 (mob ringleaders and those who commit acts of violence as parts of mobs) and § 115 para. 2 (ringleaders and resisters during riots), if the perpetrator has committed the act of resistance by force or threat with weapons or in a conscious and deliberate encounter with armed persons.

§ 5. Upon request of the holder of executive power, extraordinary courts shall be established by the Reich minister of justice. The jurisdiction of these courts shall include, in addition to the offences listed in § 9 of the Decree of the president of the Reich of 29 March 1921 (Reich Law Gazette. p. 371), the misdemeanors and felonies under § 3 of this decree.

§ 6. This Decree shall enter into force upon enactment.

Neudeck and Berlin, 20 July 1932: Reich President von Hindenburg – Reich Chancellor von Papen – Reich Minister of the Interior Baron von Gayl – Reich Minister of the Armed Forces von Schleicher
