= Bornheim (Rheinland) =

- Town
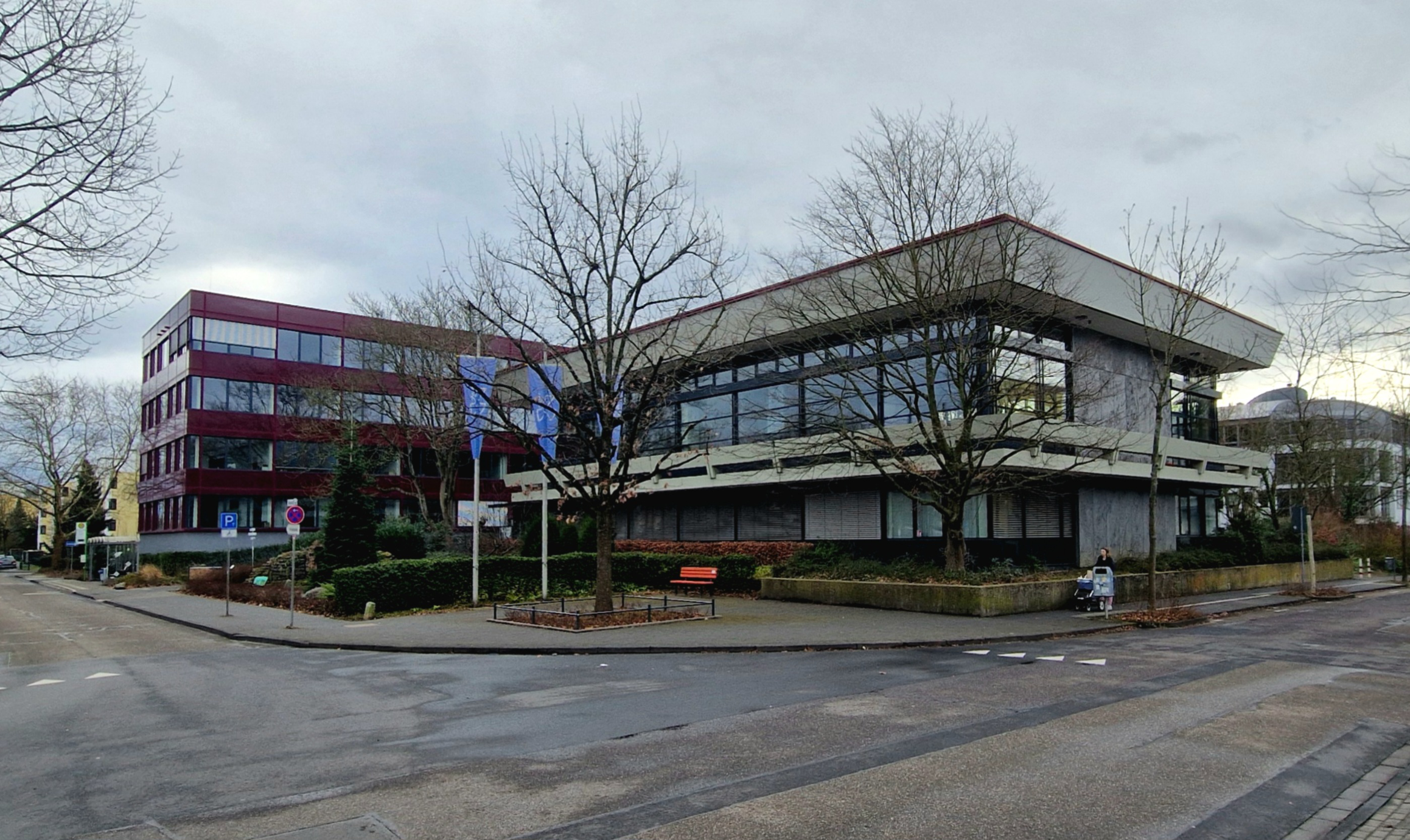
- City Hall of Bornheim

- Coat of arms

- Location of Bornheim within Rhein-Sieg-Kreis district
- Interactive map of Bornheim
- Location within Germany Location within North Rhine-Westphalia
- Coordinates: 50°45′33″N 7°0′18″E
- Country: Germany
- State: North Rhine-Westphalia
- Admin. region: Cologne
- District: Rhein-Sieg-Kreis
- Subdivisions: 14

Government
  - Mayor (2020–25): Christoph Becker (Ind.)

Area
  - Total: 82.69 km^{2} (31.93 sq mi)
- Elevation: 55 m (180 ft)

Population (2025-12-31)
  - Total: 47,890
  - Density: 579.2/km^{2} (1,500/sq mi)
- Time zone: UTC+01:00 (CET)
  - Summer (DST): UTC+02:00 (CEST)
- Postal codes: 53332
- Dialling codes: 02222, 02227, 02236 (Widdig)
- Vehicle registration: SU
- Website: www.bornheim.de

Bornheim (German pronunciation: [ˈbɔʁnhaɪm]; Ripuarian: Bonnem) is a town in the Rhein-Sieg district, in North Rhine-Westphalia, Germany. It is situated on the West bank of the Rhine, approx. 10 km north-west of Bonn, 20 km south of Cologne.

The town borders on Bonn to the south, the towns of Alfter and Swisttal to the southwest, the town of Weilerswist to the west, the towns of Brühl and Wesseling to the north, as well as the Rhine-bordering town of Niederkassel in the east.

== Subdivisions ==
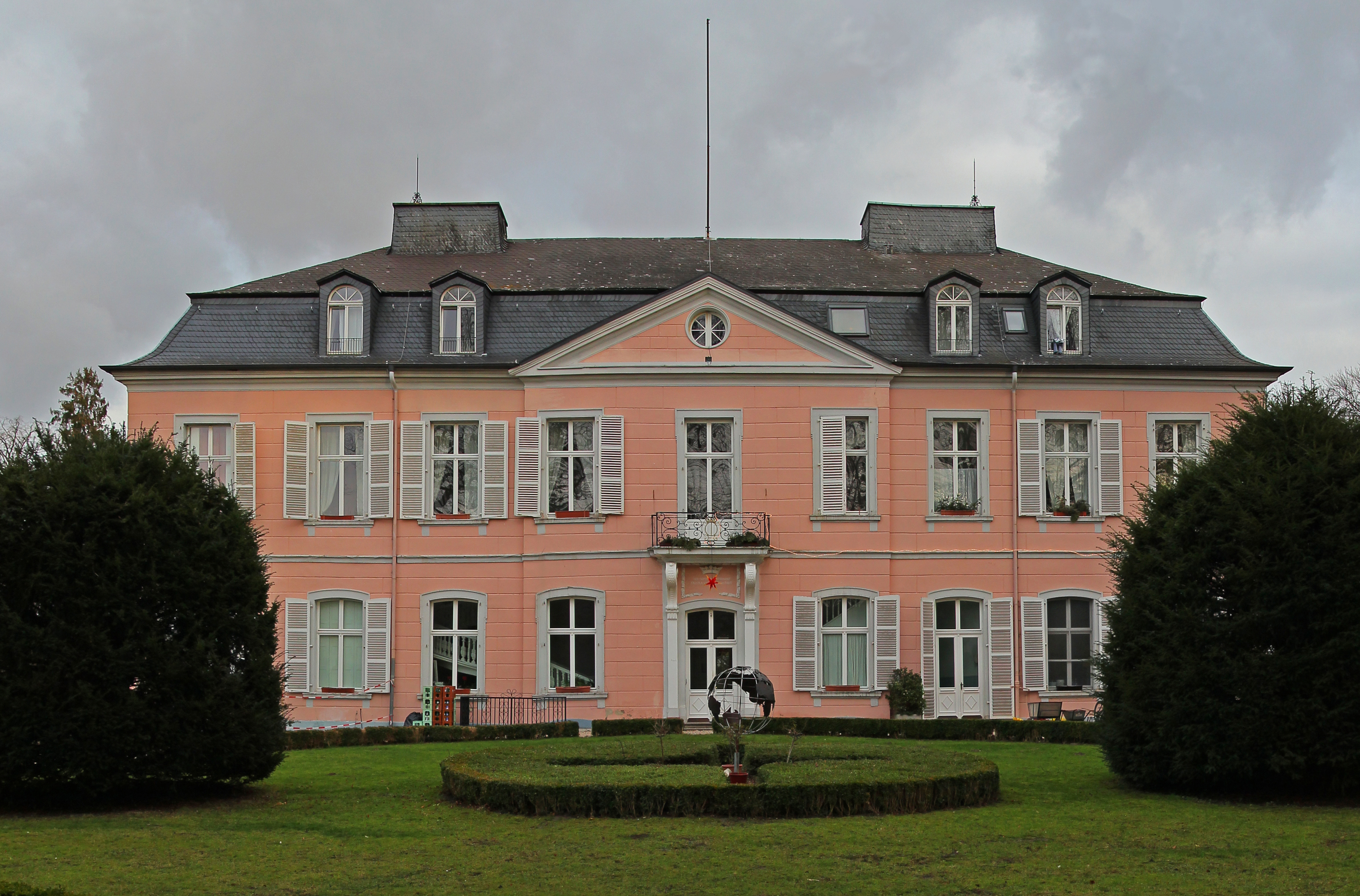
Bornheim Palace

Bornheim is divided up into 14 districts: Bornheim, Brenig, Dersdorf, Hemmerich, Hersel, Kardorf, Merten, Rösberg, Roisdorf, Sechtem, Uedorf, Walberberg, Waldorf and Widdig.

== Population ==
Historical population

Year	Pop.	±% p.a.
1965	28,950	—
1970	31,274	+1.56%
1975	32,844	+0.98%
1980	34,289	+0.86%
1985	35,832	+0.88%
1990	35,858	+0.01%
1995	40,180	+2.30%

Year	Pop.	±% p.a.
2000	45,407	+2.48%
2005	48,355	+1.27%
2010	48,531	+0.07%
2015	47,636	−0.37%
2020	48,348	+0.30%
2025	47,890	−0.19%

Source: Landesdatabank Nordrhein-Westfalen

== Economy ==
Bornheim has a strong agricultural industry and is famous for its white asparagus.

== Transport ==
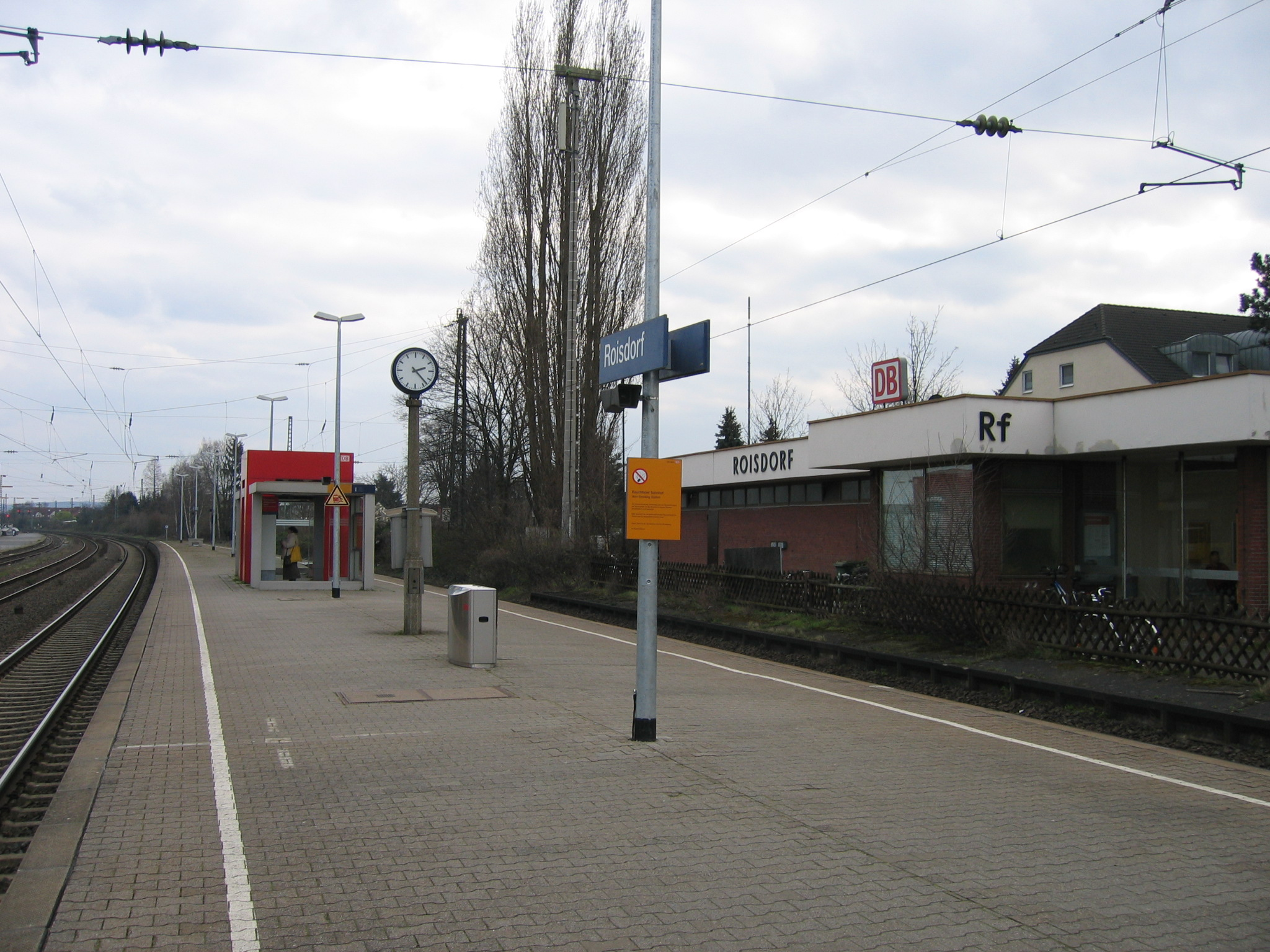
Bornheim-Roisdorf station

The train stations Bornheim-Roisdorf and Bornheim-Sechtem are located in Bornheim and served by RB26 and RB48.

== Twin towns – sister cities ==
Bornheim is twinned with:

- Bornem, Belgium
- Mittweida, Germany
- Zawiercie, Poland

== Notable people ==
- Paul von Rusdorf (c. 1385–1441), the master of the Teutonic Order in 1422–1441, came from the knighthood of the lords of Roisdorf. He is buried in the Annenkapelle of the Marienburg
- Ernst Volckheim (11 April 1898 – 1 September 1962) was one of the founders of armored and mechanized warfare
- Günter Lamprecht (born 1930 - 4 October 2022), actor, lives in Bornheim
- Hans-Helmuth Knütter (born 1934), political scientist and author, lives in Bornheim
- Anton Schumacher (born 1938), football goalkeeper, lives in Bornheim-Hemmerich
- Franz Bosbach (born 1952), historian
- Klaus Ludwig (born 1949), race car driver, lived in Bornheim-Roisdorf
- Bernd Stelter (born 1961), carnival and television comedian, lives in Hersel
- Johannes B. Kerner (born 1964), sportsmoderator, lived as a child in Hersel
- Arnd Schmitt (born 1965), Olympic champion in fencing 1988, lives in Bornheim
- Christian Knees (born 1981), cyclist, lives in Bornheim
- Célia Šašić (born 1988), footballer, lives in Hersel

=== Honorary citizen ===
- Heinrich Böll (1917–1985), lived from 1982 to 1985 in the district of Merten and is buried there in the old cemetery. On the 25th anniversary of his death, Böll was posthumously appointed an honorary citizen.
