= Karl Dietrich Bracher =

German historian and political scientist (1922–2016)

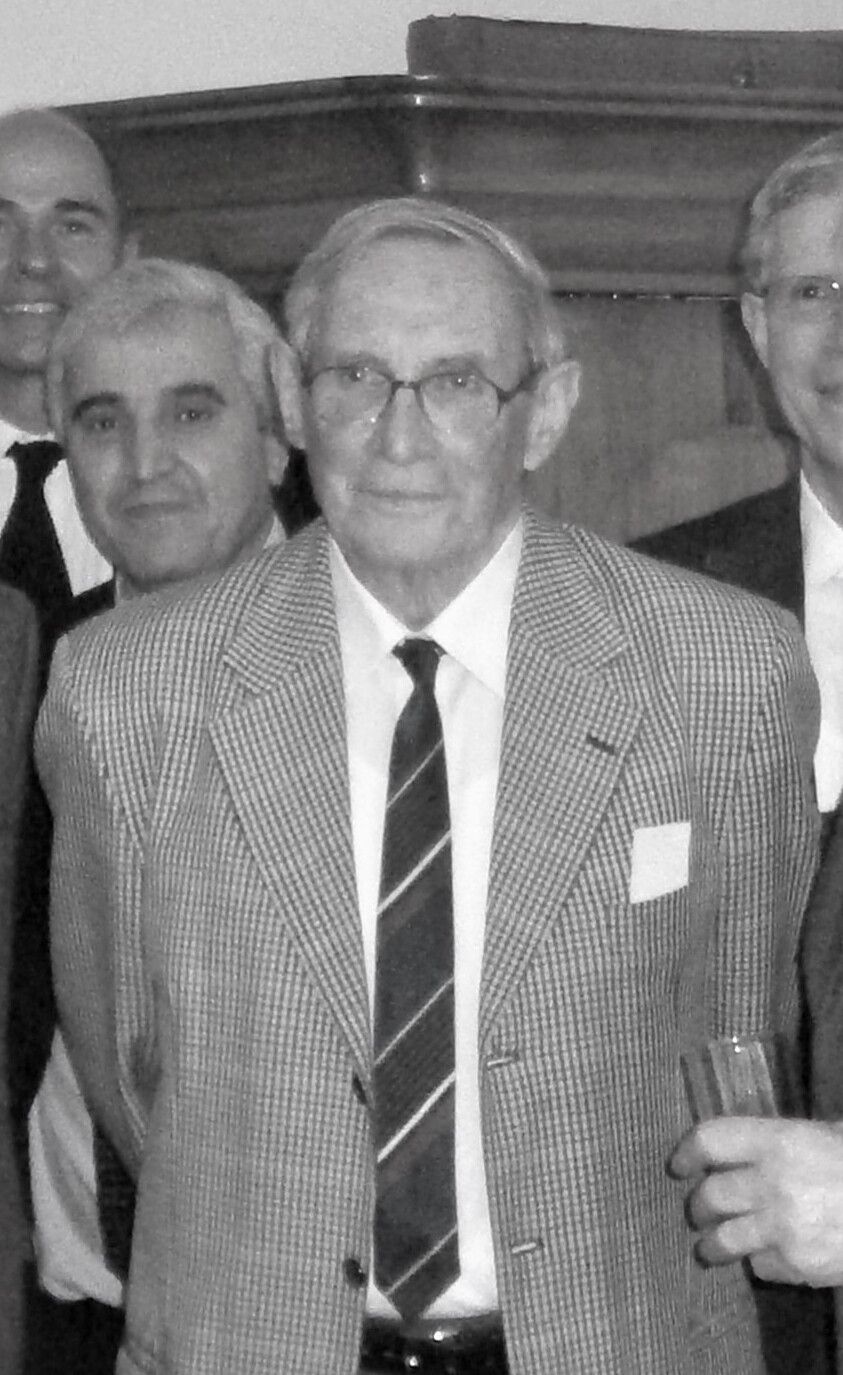
- Karl Dietrich Bracher (2012)
- Born: 13 March 1922; Stuttgart, Weimar Republic
- Died: 19 September 2016 (aged 94); Bonn, Germany
- Education: University of Tübingen; Harvard University
- Known for: Arguing that the collapse of the Weimar Republic was not inevitable and that Nazi Germany was a totalitarian dictatorship.
- Scientific career
- Fields: Political science Modern history
- Workplaces: Free University of Berlin; University of Bonn
- Doctoral students: Hoffmann, Knütter, Mirow, Miller, Pflüger
- Other notable students: Kühnhardt

Karl Dietrich Bracher (13 March 1922 – 19 September 2016) was a German political scientist and historian of the Weimar Republic and Nazi Germany, born in Stuttgart. During World War II, he served in the Wehrmacht and was captured by the Americans while serving in Tunisia in 1943. Bracher was awarded a Ph.D. in the classics by the University of Tübingen in 1948 and subsequently studied at Harvard University from 1949 to 1950. Bracher taught at the Free University of Berlin from 1950 to 1958 and at the University of Bonn since 1959.

== Early life and education ==
Karl Dietrich Bracher was born in Stuttgart in 1922. During World War II, he served in the Wehrmacht. He was captured by the Americans while serving in Tunisia in 1943. He was interned at Camp Concordia, Kansas until 1945. Bracher returned to Germany, studied at the University of Tübingen and was awarded a Ph.D. in the classics in 1948.

== Career ==
From 1949 to 1950 Bracher studied at Harvard University. Bracher taught at the Free University of Berlin from 1950 to 1958 and at the University of Bonn from 1959 to 1987. From 1978, he was the co-publisher of the Vierteljahrshefte für Zeitgeschichte (Quarterly Journal of Contemporary History).

== Personal life and death ==
In 1951, Bracher married Dorothee Schleicher, the niece of Dietrich Bonhoeffer. They had two children.

He died on 19 September 2016 at the age of 94.

== Historical views ==
=== Researching the collapse of Weimar ===
Bracher was mainly concerned with the problems of preserving and developing democracy. Bracher was consistent in all his works in arguing for the value of human rights, pluralism and constitutional values, together with urging that Germans align themselves with the democratic values of the West. He saw democracy as a frail institution and has argued that only a concerned citizenry can guarantee it. This theme began with Bracher's first book in 1948, Verfall und Fortschritt im Denken der frühen römischen Kaiserzeit which concerned the downfall of the Roman Republic and the rise of Augustus. His 1955 book Die Auflösung der Weimarer Republik (The Disintegration of the Weimar Republic) is his best known book, in which he ascribed the collapse of German democracy not to the Sonderweg ("special path" of German historical development) or other impersonal forces but to human action that followed conscious choice. In that book, Bracher rejected not only the Sonderweg thesis, but also the Marxist theory of National Socialism as the result of a capitalist "conspiracy", the theory that the Treaty of Versailles caused the collapse of the Weimar Republic, and the view that the Nazi dictatorship was simply the work of "fate". Bracher's methodology in Die Auflösung der Weimarer Republik involving a mixture of political science and history was considered to be highly innovative and controversial in the 1950s. The German historian Eberhard Kolb wrote Die Auflösung der Weimarer Republik was "still unsurpassed as a work of research" on the end of the Weimar Republic. Bracher wrote that though almost all Germans rejected the Treaty of Versailles, this dislike of Versailles had nothing with do with the coming of presidential government in March 1930 or rise of the Nazi Party starting with the September 1930 Reichstag election. Furthermore, Bracher wrote that under Weimar, the judicial system had already politicized as the judges, almost all of whom had begun their careers in the Imperial era, had a tendency to impose very lenient sentences for political crimes done in the name of the right. In Die Auflösung der Weimarer Republik, Bracher wrote the judiciary was in part responsible for the collapse of the Weimar republic, "contributing to its overthrow by authoritarian and totalitarian movements."

Bracher argued the beginning of the end of the Weimar Republic was the coming of presidential government in 1930. Starting with the government of Heinrich Brüning, chancellors sought not to govern via the Reichstag, instead using the "25/48/53 formula", referring to the constitutional articles that gave the Reich president the power to dissolve the Reichstag (25), issue emergency decrees (48) and appoint the chancellor (53). The practice was technically legal but violated the spirit of the constitution since article 54 explicitly stated the chancellor and his cabinet were responsible to the Reichstag. Bracher maintained that the end of German democracy was not inevitable, but instead was due to conscious choices coupled with "momentous errors and failures" made by Germany's leaders, especially President Paul von Hindenburg. In Die Auflösung der Weimarer Republik, Bracher argued the "collapse" of the republic went through several stages:

- The "loss of power" with Brüning as the cabinet governed only with Article 48, instead of the Reichstag.
- The "power vacuum" with Franz von Papen and Kurt von Schleicher as democracy was gutted, but neither man could build a new system in his short time in office.
- The "seizure of power" by the National Socialists in 1933.

Bracher in writing of a "loss of power" and a "power vacuum" was referring to the decay of the democratic system, not a weakening of the state. Kolb noted in the years 1930–33, the Reichswehr, the bureaucracy, the police and above all President von Hindenburg all saw a dramatic increase in their power, and what was happening in Germany in that period was the gradual collapse of the democratic system with policy decisions increasingly being made by the Reichswehr and the Kamarilla of President Hindenburg instead of the Reichstag.

Bracher argued that the system of presidential government was intended to and had the effect of weakening democracy, and that in no way was presidential government forced on Hindenburg and his Chancellors by an unmanageable crisis. Bracher's thesis that Heinrich Brüning and even more so, his successor Franz von Papen had gutted German democracy involved him in a dispute with Werner Conze, a prominent Nazi historian during Nazi rule who emerged as a leading conservative historian in West Germany in the 1950s. In a series of articles published in the 1950s–60s, Conze argued that by 1929–1930 that German politics had become so dysfunctional that Hindenburg had no other choice, but to reluctantly bring in presidential government as the only way to provide Germany with any sort of government, and that Brüning's governing via Article 48 was only a temporary measure intended to save democracy from the crisis caused by the Great Depression in Germany. In reply, Bracher wrote a series of articles documenting that the plans for presidential government went back much to 1926 at least, and argued that there was no unmanageable crisis with parliamentary government in 1930 that made presidential government unavoidable. Bracher forcefully argued that was no structural crisis in 1929–30 so severe that Hindenburg had to turn to presidential government as Conze was claiming, instead arguing that Hindenburg, his kamarilla, and the Reichswehr had been seeking long before the Great Depression to do away with democracy. In this regard, Bracher pointed out that General Kurt von Schleicher and Heinrich Brüning had worked out the plan for a presidential government by April 1929, and it was only Hindenburg's desire to have the government of Hermann Müller pass the Young Plan, which its turn was delayed by the Young Plan referendum of November 1929, that gave Müller almost an extra year in office.

Bracher's thesis about the Brüning government as the first step towards dissolving democracy instead of an effort to save it as maintained by Conze, was greatly supported by the posthumous publication of Brüning's memoirs in 1970. Brüning, a conservative Catholic who never married and is not known to have had a relationship with any women during the course of his life, revealed himself in his memoirs to be a man with an unhealthy emotional dependence on Hindenburg, to whom he was slavishly devoted and whom he regarded in homoerotic terms as the epitome of German masculinity and strength. Brüning openly admitted in his memoirs that the purpose of the presidential government was to do away with democracy and restore the monarchy by bringing back the exiled Wilhelm II, and complained at much length about how unfair it was that Schleicher had turned Hindenburg against him in the spring of 1932, leading to the president to fire him and replace him with Papen. It is noteworthy that Brüning did not object to Papen's policies in his memoirs, but rather to the fact that he would have carried out the same policies if only his beloved Field Marshal Hindenburg had given him the chance, instead of firing him in May 1932. Although Bracher won the debate with Conze, as late as 1971 Bracher deplored the tendency to take "a conservative and all too benevolent view of the presidential regime" as an attempt to save democracy. After the publication of Brüning's memoirs, which largely confirmed Bracher's thesis, Bracher wrote that the coming of presidential government was "not a move to save democracy, but part of a conscious plan to bring about a right-wing regime independent of party and parliament and to keep the Social Democrats out of power...Brüning's policy oscillated between the defense of a bureaucratic version of a state based on the rule of law, and paving the way for a dictatorship...He was not...the last chancellor before the break-up of the Weimar Republic, but the first chancellor in the process of destroying German democracy". In a survey of the historiography of the Weimar republic, Kolb wrote that research since the 1970s has confirmed Bracher's damning picture of Brüning that he had first offered in 1955, when the evidence for it was weaker.

Bracher sharply criticized the Social Democrats for not resisting the 1932 Prussian coup d'état launched by Franz von Papen that saw the Social Democratic government of Otto Braun ousted by presidential decree. Bracher wrote that the Reichswehr would probably have crushed any resistance, but "there remained the possibility of a lasting demonstration, a manifestation of the unbroken will of democracy to assert itself against a temporarily superior force. This might, beyond all justified practical calculations, have make it possible to save the democratic consciousness from the psychological and moral collapse of the republican forces; it made have made the way harder for the new rulers; delayed future developments and lessened their effects."

Bracher wrote that up until July 1932, those Germans who believed in democracy had high spirits and were full of fighting determination to take a stand, and after the Prussian coup, the same people became demoralized and passive, feeling that they were playing in a game whose rules were rigged against them, losing their fighting spirit. Bracher's views about the "Rape of Prussia", as Papen's coup was also known, involved him in heated debate with Arnold Brecht, who maintained that nothing could be done to oppose the Prussian coup, as that would mean breaking the law. Bracher in his turn argued that Papen's reasons for his coup, namely the Social Democrats and the German Communist Party were about to merge into a "united left" to start a Marxist revolution in Germany were patently absurd, and given that Papen's intention was to dissolve democracy, that there are times when it is acceptable to break the law. Bracher argued that Brecht's thesis that resistance to Papen's coup was impossible because it would have meant breaking the law was just an excuse for passivity. Historians have generally agreed with Bracher's thesis that there are times when in the face of injustice committed by those who hold power that it is acceptable to break the law, and that the Prussian coup was one of those times when illegality in defense of democracy would have been justified.

=== 1960s ===
In Bracher's opinion, although it was human choices that led to the collapse of the Weimar Republic and the National Socialist period, the roots of National Socialism can be traced back towards the völkisch ideology of 19th century Germany and Austria-Hungary, which found their fullest expression in the personality of Adolf Hitler. Likewise, Bracher complained that too many Germans were willing during the Weimar-Nazi time periods to subscribe to a "readiness for acclamatory agreement and pseudo-military obedience to a strong authoritarian state". Although Bracher was opposed to the Sonderweg interpretation of German history, he did believe in a special German mentality (Sonderbewusstsein) that made Nazi Germany possible. Bracher wrote that:

"The German "Sonderweg" should be limited to the era of the Third Reich, but the strength of the particular German mentality [Sonderbewusstsein] that had arisen already with its opposition to the French Revolution and grew stronger after 1870 and 1918 must be emphasized. Out of its exaggerated perspectives (and, I would add, rhetoric) it become a power in politics, out a myth reality. The road from democracy to dictatorship was not a particular German case, but the radical nature of the National Socialist dictatorship corresponded to the power of the German ideology that in 1933–1945 became a political and totalitarian reality"

The Sonderbewusstsein Bracher referred to was the original theory of the Sonderweg, namely the idea of the Prussian-German state as the great Central European power neither of the West nor of the East, but rather was something special and unique; this ideology emphasised opposition to democracy as part of its opposition to "Western civilization".

Another well-known book associated with Bracher was the 1960 monograph co-written with Wolfgang Sauer and Gerhard Schulz Die nationalsozialistische Machtergreifung (The National Socialist Seizure of Power), which described in considerable detail the Gleichschaltung of German life in 1933–1934. In a review of Die nationalsozialistische Machtergreifung, the American historian Walter Laqueur praised Bracher, Sauer and Schulz for their refusal to engage in apologetics, and willingness to ask tough questions about the conduct of Germans under the Nazi regime. In the same review, Laqueur expressed regret that books like William L. Shirer's The Rise and Fall of the Third Reich were best-sellers, while a book like Die nationalsozialistische Machtergreifung, which Laqueur regarded as infinitely better work of scholarship then Shirer's book was unlikely ever to be translated into English, let alone become a bestseller.

Bracher advocated the view that Nazi Germany was a totalitarian regime, although Bracher maintained that the "totalitarian typology" as developed by Carl Joachim Friedrich and Zbigniew Brzezinski was too rigid, and that totalitarian models needed to be based upon careful empirical research. In Bracher's view, Friedrich's and Brzezinski's work failed to take into account the "revolutionary dynamic", which Bracher argued was the "core principle" of totalitarianism. For Bracher, the essence of totalitarianism was the total claim to control and remake all aspects of society together with an all-embracing ideology, the value on authoritarian leadership, and the pretence of the common identity of state and society, which distinguished the totatitarian "closed" understanding of politics from the "open" democratic understanding. In Bracher's view, "politics is the struggle for the power of the state", and in his opinion, the traditional methods of the historian have to be supplemented by the methods of political science to properly understand political history. Speaking of historical work in his own area of speciality, namely the Weimar-Nazi periods, Bracher stated:

"It was not with Himmler, Bormann, and Heydrich, also not with the National Socialist Party, but with Hitler that the German people identified itself enthusiastically. In this there exists an essential problem, especially for German historians...To identify the sources of this fateful mistake of the past and to research it without minimizing it remains a task of German historical scholarship. Ignoring it means the loss of its commitment to truth."

Bracher was highly critical of the Marxist view of Nazi Germany, which sees the Nazi leadership as puppets of Big Business. In Bracher's opinion, the exact opposite was the case with a "primacy of politics" being exercised with business subordinate to the Nazi regime rather than a "primacy of economics" as maintained by Marxist historians. Bracher argued that Nazi actions were dictated by Nazi ideological theory, that business interests were just as much subordinate to the dictatorship as any other section of society, and that since Nazi actions were often irrational from a purely economic point of view, a "primacy of politics" prevailed.

Against the functionalist view of Nazi Germany mostly associated with left-wing historians, Bracher was to write that it was an attempt to:

"turn against the "old-liberal" totalitarianism theory and talk about a relativizing interpretation, which emphasizes the "improvisational" politics of power and domination of National Socialism. Leftish interpretations would like to leave behind the questions of guilt and responsibility in favor of a more modern, realistic analysis. But in doing this they slide into the danger of a newer underestimation and trivialization of National Socialism itself. Their analysis also brings with it, in another way, the vague leftist talk about fascism and reaction"

In the 1960s, Bracher was a leading critic of the theory of generic fascism presented by Ernst Nolte. Bracher criticized the entire notion of generic fascism as intellectually invalid and argued that it was individual choice on the part of Germans as opposed to Nolte's philosophical view of the "metapolitical" that produced National Socialism. Bracher's magnum opus, his 1969 book Die deutsche Diktatur (The German Dictatorship) was partly written to rebut Nolte's theory of generic fascism, and instead presented a picture of the National Socialist dictatorship as a totalitarian regime created and sustained by human actions. In Die deutsche Diktatur, Bracher rejected theories of generic fascism, and instead used totalitarianism theory and the methods of the social sciences to explain Nazi Germany. As an advocate of history as a social science, Bracher took a strong dislike to Nolte's philosophical theories of generic fascism. In a 1971 review, the American historian Lucy Dawidowicz called The German Dictatorship "...a work of unparalleled distinction, combing the most scrupulous objectivity with a passionate commitment to the democratic ethos". In 1989, the British historian Richard J. Evans called The German Dictatorship a "valuable" book

Bracher often criticized the functionist-structuralist interpretation of Nazi Germany championed by such scholars such as Martin Broszat and Hans Mommsen, and decried their view of Hitler as a "weak dictator". In Bracher's view, Hitler was the "Master of the Third Reich". However, though Bracher argues that Hitler was the driving force behind Nazi Germany, he was one of the first historians to argue that Nazi Germany was less well-organized than the Nazis liked to pretend. In a 1956 essay, Bracher noted "the antagonism between rival agencies was resolved solely in the omnipotent key position of the Führer", which was the result of "...the complex coexistence and opposition of the power groups and from conflicting personal ties". Unlike the functionists, Bracher saw this disorganization as part of a conscious "divide and rule" strategy on the part of Hitler, and argued at no point was Hitler ever driven by pressure from below or had his power limited in any way. One area where Bracher is in agreement with the functionists concerns the highly ad hoc nature of decision-making in Nazi Germany. Bracher commented that the Nazi regime "remained in a state of permanent improvisation".

=== 1970s ===
In a 1971 essay to mark the 100th anniversary of German unification, Bracher rejected the claim that Otto von Bismarck was the "grandfather" of the present-day Federal Republic, and argued that those historians who claimed that there was a line of continuity between Bismarck's German Empire and the Federal Republic were entirely mistaken. Bracher maintained that the founding of the Federal Republic in 1949 was a decisive break with everything had happened before in German history. Bracher stated that the Federal Republic — with its democracy, respect for the individual, equality of all citizens, rule of the law and its pluralist, tolerant society — owed nothing to Bismarck's vision of a rigidly hierarchical society dominated by a militaristic, authoritarian state that existed to uphold the power of theJunkers. Bracher wrote that the success of the modern Federal Republic had nothing to do with the "Bismarckian tradition" and stated that the "destruction of the state of 1871" was "the premiss and starting point for a new German state altogether". Bracher maintained that "the second, finally successful democracy in Germany is unimaginable, impossible without the ultimate failure of the Reich of 1871".

In an essay published in 1976 entitled "The Role of Hitler: Perspectives of Interpretation", Bracher argued that Hitler was too often underrated in his own time, and that those historians who rejected the totalitarian paradigm in favor of the fascist paradigm were in danger of making the same mistake. In Bracher's opinion, Hitler was a "world-historical" figure who served as the embodiment of the most radical type of German nationalism and a revolutionary of the most destructive kind, and that such was the force of Hitler's personality that it is correct to speak of National Socialism as "Hitlerism". In his essay, Bracher maintained that Hitler himself was in many ways something of an "unperson" devoid of any real interest for the biographer, but argued that these pedestrian qualities of Hitler led to him being underestimated first by rivals and allies in the Weimar Republic, and then on the international stage in the 1930s. At the same time, Bracher warned of the apologetic tendencies of the “demonization" of Hitler which he accused historians like Gerhard Ritter of engaging in, which Bracher maintained allowed too many Germans to place the blame for Nazi crimes solely on the "demon" Hitler. Though Bracher criticized the Great man theory of history as an inadequate historical explanation, he argued that social historians who claim that social developments were more important than the role of individuals were mistaken.

Bracher wrote about the "Hitler Wave" of the 1970s that the obsession with Hitler seemed odd given all of the dramatic events of the last thirty or so years (such as the Cold War, the rise and decline of Stalinism, the Hungarian Uprising, the Suez War, the Vietnam War, and the Soviet invasion of Czechoslovakia), where somehow Hitler, despite being dead, remained in "the background" of all these events. Bracher argued that the obsession with Hitler was due to the "inevitable and continuing sensational aspect caused by the excessive features of Hitlerism, which can be taken as a kind of modern Genghis Khanism or an example of that combination of cruel efficiency and superhuman will-power which frequently is identified as typically German, to be horrified or admired, or both simultaneously". Bracher argued that Hitler represented a new type of leader quite divorced from the traditional standards of historical greatness established by 18th- and 19th-century historians, as "Hitler and, in his way, Stalin represent a new type of the great movement and party leader combining the qualities of fanatical ideological fixation and virtuoso mass demagogy, and replacing the traditional statesmen and warrior as the great type of historical figure". Writing in 1976, Bracher cautioned against a return to the "Great Man" school of history, warning that "Great Man" type histories were typical of totalitarian régimes, as this concept of history as the "history of great men" was promoted not only in Nazi Germany and Fascist Italy, but "...also by communist regimes where, although quite contrary to their dogma of collectivism, it was in keeping with the psychology of mass mobilization by charismatic leadership. The great examples of this cult of leadership and pseudo-religious veneration and adoration are Lenin and Stalin and at present Mao and the North Korean demigod Kim Il Sung". However, at the same time, Bracher argued that in totalitarian régimes, the position of the leader by its very definition meant that such a leader had an oversized role in making history, thus making the study of those leaders a prerequisite for understanding these régimes.

In Bracher's view, Hitler's rise was not inevitable, and the primary responsibility for the Chancellorship being given to Hitler on 30 January 1933 rested with the Kamarilla of President Paul von Hindenburg. Bracher wrote that had Hindenburg chosen differently from that the path that he did choose by appointing Hitler chancellor on 30 January 1933, German history could easily have taken a completely different direction, thus meaning that even though Hindenburg died in 1934, he must bear ultimate responsibility for everything that happened between 1933 and 1945, for the appointment of Hitler was a purely a gratuitous act on Hindenburg's part that he did not have to do. However, Bracher argued that once Hitler had obtained power, he used his authority to carry out a comprehensive revolution that politically destroyed both Hitler's opponents (such as the SPD) and his allies (such as the DNVP, which sought to "tame" the Nazi movement). Bracher argued that because Hitler was so central to the Nazi movement, the fate of National Socialism became so intertwined with Hitler's fate that it is right, as noted above, to speak of National Socialism as Hitlerism, and hence justifying Hitler's place in history as a person who by their actions decisively brought about events that otherwise would not had occurred. In addition, Bracher maintained that the importance of Hitler derived from his being the most effective exponent of an extremely radical type of racist German nationalism, which allowed for ideas that otherwise would be ignored by historians coming to a terrible fruition.

Though Bracher argued that the work of Ralf Dahrendorf, David Schoenbaum, and Henry Ashby Turner — about National Socialism in pursuit of anti-modern goals leading to an unintentional modernization of German society — had merit, Bracher felt that the question of modernization was too removed from the essence of National Socialism, which Bracher argued involved the total revolutionary remodeling of the world along savagely racist and Social Darwinist lines. In Bracher's opinion, the revolution Hitler sought to unleash was — besides being one of racism gone mad — also a moral revolution. Bracher argued that the Nazi revolution sought to destroy traditional values that society had valued (such as friendship, kindness, and so forth) and to replace them with values such as cruelty, brutality, and destruction. Bracher argued because anti-Semitism was so crucial to Hitler's Weltanschauung (worldview) and its consequences in the form of genocide for the Jews of Europe were such, that this disproves any notion of generic fascism (because Bracher believes that theories of fascism cannot account for the Shoah). Bracher argued that generic-fascism theorists were guilty of indiscriminately lumping in too many disparate phenomena for the concept of fascism to be of any intellectual use, and of using the term "fascist" as a catch-all insult for anyone the left disliked. With respect to the genesis of the Holocaust, he is a confirmed Intentionalist. It is his position that the entire project of the genocide of European Jewry resulted from Adolf Hitler's anti-Semitic hatred.

Bracher argued that the "one basic principle to which Hitler subscribed deeply, blindly and ruthlessly" was anti-Semitism. Bracher noted that the Shoah was so important to Hitler that, during World War II, resources that might from a purely military point of view have been better devoted to the war were instead turned towards genocide. In 1981, the British Marxist historian Timothy Mason in his essay "Intention and explanation: A Current controversy about the interpretation of National Socialism" from the book The "Fuehrer State" : Myth and reality coined the term "Intentionist" as part of an attack against Bracher and Klaus Hildebrand, both of whom Mason accused of focusing too much on Hitler as an explanation for the Holocaust.

Bracher believed that totalitarianism, whether from the Left or Right, is the leading threat to democracy all over the world, and has argued that the differences between the Soviet Union and Nazi Germany were differences of degree, not of kind. Bracher opposes the notion of generic fascism and has often urged scholars to reject "totalitarian" fascism theory as championed by the "radical-left" in favour of "democratic" totalitarian theory as a means of explaining the Nazi dictatorship. In particular, Bracher has argued that Fascist Italy and Nazi Germany differed so fundamentally that any theory of generic fascism is not supported by the historical evidence. He was pro-American, and was one of the few German professors to support fully the foreign policy of the United States during the Cold War. However, Bracher was in no way sympathetic towards Fascist Italy, writing about Benito Mussolini's rise: "Appealing to all classes by a combination of conservative and progressive, anti-communist and state socialist, reactionary and revolutionary aims" and making much use of "direct action", Mussolini "went to war with liberal democracy" in 1919. Bracher was a consistent advocate of the values of the Federal Republic and of its American ally against the values of East Germany and its Soviet patron. In the 1960s, 1970s and 1980s he often attacked left-wing and New Left intellectuals — in particular for comparing the actions of the West German state and of the United States in the Vietnam War to those of Nazi Germany. For Bracher, these attacks were both an absurd trivialization of Nazi crimes and a sinister attempt to advance the cause of Communism. Bracher argued that the defeatist and uncertain mood of the 1970s and 1980s in West Germany was not unlike the mood of the 1920s and 1930s. In 1969–74 Bracher supported the Social Democratic and Free Democrat coalition of Chancellor Willy Brandt and his policy of Ostpolitik, arguing that it was long overdue that the Federal Republic recognize the Oder-Neisse Line. By the mid-1970s Bracher had turned against the Social Democrats, arguing that far too many people in West Germany were naïve and blithely dismissive of the threat posed by Soviet Communism. Bracher always saw himself as a liberal, opposed to totalitarianism of both left and right, a standpoint that led him to attack both conservatives and Communists.

In his 1976 book Zeitgeschichtliche Kontroversen, Bracher criticized the Marxist-New Left interpretation of the Nazi period on the grounds that in such an interpretation "the ideological and totalitarian dimension of National Socialism shrinks to such an extent that the barbarism of 1933–45 disappears as a moral phenomenon", which Bracher felt meant that "...a new wave of trivialization or even apologetics was beginning". In his 1977 essay entitled "Zeitgeschichte im Wandel der Interpretationen", published in the Historische Zeitschrift journal, Bracher argued that the student protests of the late 1960s had resulted in a "Marxist renaissance", with the "New Left" exercising increasing control over university curricula. Although Bracher felt that some of the resulting work was of value, too much of the resulting publications were in his opinion executed with "crude weapons" in which "the ideological struggle was carried out on the back and in the name of scholarship" with a corrosive effect on academic standards. Bracher wrote that the student protests of the late 1960s had "politicized and often...objectionably distorted" the work of historians. In his 1978 book Schlüsselwörter in der Geschichte, Bracher warned that the "totalitarian temptation" (which he associated with the New Left, and above all with the Red Army Faction terrorist group) was a serious threat to West German democracy, and called upon scholars to do their part to combat such trends before it was too late. Bracher warned against "Peace" and "Green" movements operating outside of the political system offering a radical version of an alternative utopian system, which he warned — if the crisis in confidence in democracy continued — could lead to a gradual undermining of democracy in Germany. In their turn, elements of the West German Left attacked Bracher as a neo-Nazi and branded him an "American stooge". In particular, Bracher warned of the "tendency, through theorizing and ideologizing alienation from the history of persons and events, to show and put into effect as the dominant leading theme the contemporary criticism of capitalism and democracy". Along the same lines, Bracher criticized the return to what he regarded as the crude Comintern theories of the 1920s and 1930s which labeled democracy as a form of "late capitalist" and "late bourgeois" rule, and of the New Left practice of referring to the Federal Republic as a "restorative" Nazi state.

=== 1980s ===
In the introduction to his 1982 book Zeit der Ideologien (Age of Ideologies), Bracher wrote: "When the realization of high-pitched political expectations was found to come up against certain limits, there was a revival of the confrontation, especially painful in Germany and one that was generally believed to have been overcome". Bracher attacked Communism under the grounds that its claim to have "scientifically" worked out the laws of history was the source of "its great strength vis-à-vis supporters and sympathizers but also its extremely intolerant and coercive character." Bracher wrote: "Communist policies are something mystical, something surpassing the rational capability of the individual, something fully accessible only to the collective and its leadership," which promoted itself as "an exclusively informed elite." As part of his critique of Communism, Bracher wrote:

"No limits were to that elite's supranational competence…. It is this moral and intellectual totalitarianism pseudo-scientifically justified and politically enforced, that represents both the strength and the weakness of communist ideology. It was able to bring salvation from doubts in a modern complex world, but it was bound, time and again, to come into conflict with the facts of that complexity."

During the Historikerstreit (Historians' Dispute) of the 1986–88, Bracher argued in a letter to the editor of Frankfurter Allgemeine Zeitung published on 6 September 1986 that nothing new was being presented by either side. Bracher wrote that he approved of Joachim Fest's essay "Encumbered Remembrance" about the moral equivalence of Nazi and Communist crimes, although he remained pointly silent about Fest's support for the theory of Ernst Nolte of a "casual nexus" with German National Socialism as an extreme, but understandable response to Soviet Communism. Bracher argued that "...the "totalitarian" force of these two ideologies [Communism and National Socialism] seized the whole human and seduced and enslaved him". Bracher accused both Jürgen Habermas and Ernst Nolte of both "...tabooing the concept of totalitarianism and inflating the formula of fascism". Bracher complained about the "politically polarized" dispute that was blinding historians to the "comparability" of Communism and National Socialism. Bracher ended his letter by writing that neither National Socialism nor Communism lost none of "...their respective "singular" inhumanity by comparisons. Neither a national nor a socialist apologetic can be supported on that basis".

In the Historikerstreit, Bracher mostly stayed on the sidelines, and took a pox-on-both-houses approach. Writing on 14 March 1987, Bracher stated he regarded the Historikerstreit as typical of the Doppelbödigkeit (ambiguities) that Germans felt towards their recent history. Bracher argued that the Federal Republic was one of two rival German states competing for the loyalty of the German people, the successor state to two regimes that failed, and inhabited by two generations with different memories of the past. Bracher wrote that for Germans: "The present dispute concerns not only the orientation and the meaning of a totalitarian "past", which is not easy to historicize, but does not simply pass away despite temporal distance". Bracher argued that given the "burden of the past", West Germany could all too easily slide into dictatorship. Bracher saw the major threat to West German democracy as coming from the left. Bracher accused the peace and Green movements as hovering "in the borderline between democracy and dictatorship", and warned that the radical left-peace-Green movements could easily become the instruments of a "pseudo-religious concepts of salvation" that would lead to a return to totalitarianism in West Germany. Bracher claimed that the situation in the late 1980s was the same as in the late 1960s "when we critics of an all-too-general concept of fascism were opposed by a front from Nolte via Habermas to the extraparliamentary opposition".

Later in the 1980s, Bracher defined totalitarianism as any state system that featured absolute ideology that allowed no rivals; a mass movement that was hierarchically organized and under state control; control of the media; and state control of the economy. Moreover, Bracher contended that totalitarianism was not just a product of the interwar period, but instead very much a product of modern times with modern technology allowing for greater possibilities for totalitarian control of society than what existed in the 1920s, 30s and 40s. Bracher argued that the essential divining line in the world today was not between left and right or between socialism and capitalism, but between dictatorship and democracy. Bracher criticized those left-wing intellectuals who damned democracies like the United States as for being capitalist while praising those dictatorships that were "progressive" like Communist Cuba as holding morally dishonest values.

Bracher emerged as one of the first proponents of the idea of the Federal Republic as a "post-national democracy" or what become known as "constitutional patriotism", a new definition of what it meant to be German. Bracher argued that in the aftermath of Nazi rule, the traditional German nationalism based on a "blood-and-soil" ideology that defined Deutschtum (Germanness) in racial terms was too morally compromised by its association with Nazism, and the values promoted by the old Prussian-Imperial Obrigkeitsstaat (authoritarian state) were not suitable for a democratic society, thus requiring something new. Instead, Bracher called for a new German nationalism that defined itself in terms of its commitment to democracy and made upholding the humanist values of the 1949 Basic Law (the constitution) the centerpiece of what it meant to be German. Bracher argued contra the traditional "national patriotism" with loyalty to the nation that with "constitutional patriotism" the primary loyalty of Germans was to be towards the Basic Law and its values, creating a new sense of German national identity based upon a sense of loyalty to the Basic Law that would to apply to all regardless of sex, religion, skin color or ethnicity. Many supporters of "national patriotism" like the historian Hagen Schulze argued Bracher's "constitutional patriotism" was too dry and abstract, maintaining that Germans needed a stronger glue than loyalty to the Basic Law to have a sustainable sense of national identity, thus requiring loyalty to the nation. In the 1970s–80s, Bracher published a series of essays calling for "constitutional patriotism" and a "post-national democracy" that redefined Deutschtum in terms of republican belonging to a democratic state and rejected the old definitions of the nation-state. Such was the success of Bracher's efforts that many younger Germans starting in the 1980s embraced his idea of "constitutional patriotism" as a way of affirming one's pride in being German. In 1989–1990, Bracher welcomed the fall of the East German dictatorship and German reunification. Bracher did not feel the East German SED dictatorship was morally equivalent to the Nazi regime, but he argued that the memory of how awful was the Communist regime in East Germany should be preserved to prevent any return to Communism.

=== 1990s ===
In the 1990s, Bracher argued that even though the prospects of democracy against totalitarianism had much improved, he warned that this was no time for triumphalism. In 1992, Bracher wrote that democracy is a state "of self-limitation and insight into the imperfection of man, just as dictatorship is the rule of man's ideological arrogance." Bracher contended that although there were better chances for democracy in the post-1989 world than in the "short 20th century" of 1914–89, there only was the hard work of building and maintaining a civil society ahead for the world, and this task could never be completed. In his 1992 book Turning Points in Modern Times, Bracher attacked Nolte for his claims that German National Socialism was merely a "mirror image" of the Soviet Union. Bracher wrote that Nolte's work "trivializes" the vicious racism that Bracher stated was at the heart of National Socialism by suggesting that it was just a "copy" of Soviet Communism and thus not as evil as the Soviet original. In a 2003 interview with Der Spiegel, Bracher was highly critical of Chancellor Gerhard Schröder's opposition to the Iraq War, and warned against using anti-Americanism to win elections as potentially damaging Germany's relations with the United States, a development that Bracher much deplored.

The American historian Jeffrey Herf wrote in an obituary:

The complaints about democracy and liberalism that Bracher examined in The German Dictatorship find echoes in our own time. Our institutions are far more stable than those of the Weimar Republic, but the appeal of authoritarianism and conspiracy-theorizing is growing in Western politics. Therefore Bracher's work on how democracy was destroyed in Germany in the 1930s remains uncomfortably relevant. Moreover, the era of totalitarian ideology and politics did not end with the collapse of Communism in Europe. Using Bracher's criteria, it continues, most importantly in the Islamist movements that have fueled the terrorism of recent decades. Totalitarianism has changed both its geographical location and its cultural coordinates, but in its inhumanity and irrationality it merits comparison with its 20th-century predecessors. Here, too, Karl Bracher's work will remain important for years to come both for historians of the Nazi and Communist dictatorships and for advocates of liberal democracy in a world that faces multiple illiberal challenges.

== Honors ==
- Emeritus of the American Academy of Arts and Sciences.
- Corresponding Fellow of the British Academy.
- Member of the American Philosophical Society.
- Member of the Historische Kommission zu Berlin.
- Member of the Deutsche Akademie für Sprache und Dichtung.
- Member of the Nordrhein-Westfälische Akademie.

== Work ==
- Verfall und Fortschritt im Denken der frühen römischen Kaiserzeit: Studien zum Zeitgeühl und Geschichtsbewusstein des Jahrhunderts nach Augustus, 1948.
- Die Aufösung der Weimarer Republik: Eine Studie zum Problem des Machtverfalls in der Demokratie 1955.
- "Stufen totalitärer Gleichschaltung: Die Befestigung der nationalsozialistischen Herrschaft 1933/34" pages 30–42 from Vierteljahrshefte für Zeitgeschichte, Volume 4, Issue # 1, January 1956, translated into English as "Stages of Totalitarian "Integration" (Gleichschaltung): The Consolidation of National Socialist Rule in 1933 and 1934" pages 109–128 from Republic To Reich The Making of the Nazi Revolution Ten Essays edited by Hajo Holborn, New York: Pantheon Books 1972, ISBN 0-394-47122-9.
- co-edited with Annedore Leber & Willy Brandt Das Gewissen steht auf: 64 Lebensbilder aus dem deutschen Widerstand 1933–1945, 1956, translated into English as The Conscience in Revolt: Portraits of the German Resistance 1933–1945, Mainz: Hase & Koehler, 1994 ISBN 3-7758-1314-4.
- co-written with Wolfgang Sauer and Gerhard Schulz: Die nationalsozialistische Machtergreifung: Studien zur Errichtung des totalitären Herrschaftssystems in Deutschland 1933–34, 1960.
- “Problems of Parliamentary Democracy in Europe” pages 179–198 from Daedalus, Volume 93, Issue # 1 Winter 1964.
- Deutschland zwischen Demokratie und Diktatur: Beiträge zur neueren Politik und Geschichte, 1964.
- Adolf Hitler, 1964.
- Die deutsche Diktatur: Entstehung, Struktur, Folgen des Nationalsozialismus, 1969, translated into English by Jean Steinberg as The German Dictatorship; The Origins, Structure, and Effects of National Socialism; New York, Praeger 1970, with an Introduction by Peter Gay.
- Das deutsche Dilemma: Leidenswege der politischen Emanzipation, 1971, translated into English as The German Dilemma: The Throes of Political Emancipation, London: Weidenfeld & Nicolson, 1975 ISBN 0-297-76790-9.
- Die Krise Europas, 1917–1975, 1976.
- Zeitgeschichtiche Kontroversen: Um Faschismus, Totalitarismus, Demokratie, 1976.
- "The Role of Hitler: Perspectives of Interpretation" pages 211–225 from Fascism: A Reader's Guide, edited by Walter Laqueur, Harmondsworth, 1976, ISBN 0-520-03033-8.
- Europa in der Krise: Innengeschichte u. Weltpolitik seit 1917, 1979.
- (editor) Quellen zur Geschichte des Parlamentarismus und der politischen Parteien, Bd 4/1 Politik und Wirtschaft in der Krise 1930–1932 Quellen Ära Brüning Tel I, Bonn, 1980.
- Geschichte und Gewalt: Zur Politik im 20. Jahrhundert, 1981.
- “The Disputed Concept of Totalitarianism,” pages 11–33 from Totalitarianism Reconsidered edited by Ernest A. Menze, Port Washington, N.Y. / London: Kennikat Press, 1981, ISBN 0-8046-9268-8.
- Zeit der Ideologien: Eine Geschichte politischen Denkens im 20. Jahrhundert, 1982, translated into English as The Age Of Ideologies : A History of Political Thought in the Twentieth Century, New York : St. Martin's Press, 1984, ISBN 0-312-01229-2.
- co-edited with Hermann Graml Widerstand im Dritten Reich: Probleme, Ereignisse, Gestalten, 1984.
- Die Totalitäre Erfahrung, 1987.
- "Der historishe Ort des Zweiten Weltkrieges" pages 347–374 from 1939-An Der Schwelle Zum Weltkrieg: Die Entfesselung Des Zweiten Weltkrieges Und Das Internationale System edited by Klaus Hildebrand, Jürgen Schmadeke & Klaus Zernack, Berlin: Walter de Gruyter & Co 1990, ISBN 3-11-012596-X.
- Wendezeiten der Geschichte: Historisch-politische Essays, 1987–1992, 1992, translated into English Turning Points In Modern Times : Essays On German and European History, translated by Thomas Dunlap; with a foreword by Abbott Gleason, Cambridge, Massachusetts : Harvard University Press, 1995, ISBN 0-674-91354-X.
- co-edited with Manfred Funke & Hans-Adolf Jacobsen Deutschland 1933–1945. Neue Studien zur nationalsozialistischen Herrschaft, 1992.
- co-written with Eberhard Jäckel; Johannes Gross;, Theodor Eschenburg & Joachim Fest: Geschichte der Bundesrepublik Deutschland, 1994.
- Geschichte als Erfahrung. Betrachtungen zum 20. Jahrhundert, 2001.
- co-edited with P. M. Brilman & H. M. Von Der DunkJustiz und NS-Verbrechen, 2008.
- co-edited with Hans-Adolf Jacobsen, Volker Kronenberg, & Oliver Spatz Politik, Geschichte und Kultur. Wissenschaft in Verantwortung für die res publica. Festschrift für Manfred Funke zum 70. Geburtstag, 2009.

== See also ==
- List of Adolf Hitler books
