= Hubertus Hoffmann =

German businessman

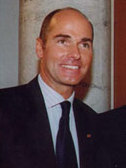
Hubertus Hoffmann receiving the Federal Cross of Merit from Johannes Rau, President of the Federal Republic of Germany, October 2000

Hubertus Hoffmann is a German entrepreneur, geostrategist, author, and philanthropist. He is the founder and president of the NGOs The World Security Network Foundation, Mission Future, and The Human Codes of Tolerance.

== Activities as a university student and young scientist ==
Hoffmann was born in Göttingen. He studied Law, History, and Political Science at the University of Bonn and worked as an advisor in the European Parliament (Office of Prof. Hans-Gert Poettering, later President of the European Parliament), the German Bundestag (State Secretary of Defense Peter Kurt Würzbach, MP) and the U.S. Senate (Sam Nunn, Gary Hart) in defense and foreign affairs.

Hoffmann was a Research Fellow at the Center for Strategic & International Studies (CSIS), Georgetown University. Hoffmann holds a Ph.D. in Political Science with summa cum laude (Prof. Karl Dietrich Bracher, University of Bonn, Germany) and is a lawyer as well. He is a reserve officer in the German Army (Bundeswehr).

== Journalist, manager, and investor ==
Since 1995 Hoffmann has worked as an entrepreneur and investor in different funds. His entrepreneurial track record includes New Media Digital GmbH (1996), MBI/MBO, Loewe Opta GmbH (1996) and Internet Media House AG (1998-2001). From 1996 to 2000 he was founder and CEO of InternetMediaHouse AG and a large investor and member of the Executive Board at Loewe TV company.

He then became CEO of the radio business of the Georg von Holtzbrink Publishing Group, and later Managing Director for New Media in the Burda Publishing Group in Munich, building up 15 companies for new media in Europe from 1993 to 1995. In 2005 he became co-founder of German Capital Group (GCG) which invested from 2005 to 2007 Euro 3.3 bn in companies like Volkswagen, BASF, ThyssenKrupp, Lanxess and Siemens. Since 1995 Hoffmann has been a founder and investor in several internet-companies in Europe, Silicon Valley and China.

== Political activities ==
Aged 25, Hoffmann, in 1980, initiated a CDU/CSU resolution and Federal Law of the Bundestag for an Annual Report on Arms Control and Disarmament, which since then has been published by the German Government.

For ten years Hoffmann was Chairman of the Christian Democratic Union (CDU) Committee for Foreign, Defense, European and Inner-German Affairs in his home state of Lower Saxony in Germany. In 1984, he initiated the exchange program for young reserve officers from the US and Germany. He was a German member of the Executive Committee of the NATO Reserve Officers Association CIOR. In 1986 Hoffmann was elected member of the City Council in his hometown Goslar (Harz).

He supported the Mujaheddin from 1985 to 1990 against the Soviet invasion of Afghanistan, visiting them in the mountains in 1985 and writing the Afghanistan Report for the European Parliament.

In 1989, he initiated and helped to finance the first Farmers Association of Silesia which now has more than 3,000 Polish and German members and runs its own dairy. As early as 1992 Mission Future founder Dr. Hubertus Hoffmann established an International Study Group “Baltic Hanseatic Region” (including Friedrich Merz, now German Chancellor and then Member of the European Parliament, Oblast Kaliningrad, Lithuania, Latvia, and Estonia) on behalf of Estonian President Tunne Kelam, which helped to stabilize democracy in the Baltic after decades of Soviet occupation.

In 2010, he initiated the first official "Progress Report on Afghanistan" of the German Government supported by the SPD opposition and the CDU/CSU and FDP groups in the Bundestag.

Since 2013, one of his main activities is The Human Codes of Tolerance and Respect Project, promoting universal rules for parents, educators, journalists, religious leaders, and politicians on how to promote respect for other religions, races and ethnic minorities, as important soft factors of peacemaking including best practices from all over the world.

In June 2020, he started Mission Future, promoting a new Policy 4.0 based on the three pillars humanity – including freedom and tolerance – as well as creativity and effectiveness with comprehensive reforms in all states with a ‘thinking heart and a loving mind’.

== Filmmaker and producer ==
With his global Love Is Tolerance initiative, Hoffmann co-produced the Watani: My Homeland documentary about a family from Aleppo coming to his hometown Goslar in Germany. This documentary was nominated for the Oscars 2017, won the award for Best Documentary at German Television Awards 2017 (in German state TV ZDF Das Schicksal der Kinder von Aleppo), and Audience Award at the Amsterdam International Documentary Festival.

In 2018, Hoffmann directed and produced "Love is Tolerance—Tolerance is Love—Make Tolerance Great Again!" It is a global search for the Champions of Tolerance and how we can make tolerance great again to contain all extremists. Describing the value of diversity and respect towards social minorities and other religions. In this feature documentary of 85 minutes the three Nobel Peace Prize laureates, the 14th Dalai Lama, Malala Yousafzai and Kailash Satyarthi promote tolerance. The film includes portraits of Ehud Barak, Yusuf Islam (Cat Stevens) and many other 'Champions of Tolerance' and young people from all over the world.

He is also co-producer of "The Last Supper" (Das Letzte Mahl, 2017), a chamber play about a Jewish family dinner in Berlin on January 30, 1933, the day Adolf Hitler came into power. This drama was shown at the 13th Los Angeles Jewish Film Festival 2018.

Hoffmann has funded before the popular Hollywood films, "Girl, Interrupted" (starring Angelina Jolie who won her first Oscar as Supporting Actress) and "Hanging Up" (starring Meg Ryan, Diane Keaton, Lisa Kudrow and Walter Matthau). He financed these films with a personal investment, using his SPV in the Global Entertainment Productions KG company, in cooperation with Sony Picture Studios in Los Angeles.

== Arts ==
Hoffmann presented his international art projects, The Places and the Globes of Tolerance and The Champions of Tolerance, including videos and portraits of the Dalai Lama, Malala, and Yusuf Islam (Cat Stevens), at the Art Cologne and Gallery Weekend Berlin in 2017.

== Awards ==
In 1981 his home town of Goslar awarded him its "Förderpreis" for journalistic merits (Laudatio: General (ret.) Johannes Steinhoff, former Chairman of NATO's Military Committee). In 1998 Schitag Ernst & Young, SAP and Manager Magazine honored Hoffmann as Finalist German Entrepreneur of the Year 1998 for growth and innovation as a member of the Board and co-owner of the Loewe Opta Holding TV company.

In October 2000 he was awarded the Federal Cross of Merit for "innovative business ideas" by German President Johannes Rau in Schloss Bellevue (Berlin). In 2002 at Friedrichsruh Palace near Hamburg, Prince Ferdinand von Bismarck bestowed upon Hoffmann the Bismarck Medal in Silver with Golden Oak Leaves for his "patriotic faithfulness and proven Prussian national consciousness".

As founder of the World Security Network Foundation and his Global Tolerance Initiative, developing Codes of Tolerance, Hoffmann was honored February 19, 2020, in Dubai Opera with the first "Mohammed bin Rashid Al Maktoum Tolerance Award" of the United Arab Emirates as "a role model who has made a mark on humanity, promoting tolerance, mutual respect, pluralism and peaceful coexistence" for his Codes of Tolerance, using books, art, film, and speeches" (Sheikh Nayan bin Mubarak Al Nahyan, Minister of State for Tolerance), "establishing "tolerance norms” at the international level, in addition to promoting interfaith dialogue."

== Published author ==
Hoffmann is an author of several standard books on nuclear strategy, geopolitics and tolerance.

- "Mission Future. How to Save our Democracies with Humanity, Creativity and Effectiveness: 200 Reform Proposals with Heart and Mind", Berlin, London 2021 (ISBN 978-3982186337)
- "Migration Realpolitik with Humanity.: Global Best Practices" (Berlin, London 2020; ISBN 978-3982186375)
- In 2004 he published a first book about his mentor for 25 years, Fritz G. A. Kraemer: "Fritz Kraemer On Excellence". In 2012 a new, extended edition of this book followed, titled True Keeper of the Holy Flame – The Legacy of Pentagon Strategist and Mentor Dr Fritz Kraemer with contributions from Alexander M. Haig Jr., Henry A. Kissinger, Madeleine Kraemer Bryant, Wilhelm-Karl von Preussen, Edward L. Rowny, Donald Rumsfeld and others
- Codes der Toleranz. Eine Anleitung für Weltverbesserer und Pessimisten, streng Gläubige und freie Geister. Herder, Freiburg / Breisgau 2014, 464 S., ISBN 978-3-451-33373-6. In English "Love is Tolerance – Tolerance is Love" (2017; ISBN 978-3-9821863-51), also published in Polish, Arabic and Urdu (Pakistan).
- "The 10 Commandments of Tolerance in Islam", including dialogues with Malala Yousafzai and Yusuf Islam (Cat Stevens), New York, Berlin 2017 (ISBN 978-3-9821863-68)
- Die Atompartner Washington-Bonn und die Modernisierung der taktischen Kernwaffen (Washington and Bonn as Nuclear Partners and the Issue of Modernization of Tactical Nuclear Weapons), Koblenz 1986, ISBN 3-7637-5477-6
- Atomkrieg - Atomfrieden. Technik, Strategie, Abrüstung (Nuclear War - Nuclear Peace. Technology, Strategy, Disarmament), Bernard und Graefe, Munich 1980, ISBN 3-7637-5190-4
