= Franz Bosbach =

German historian of modern age

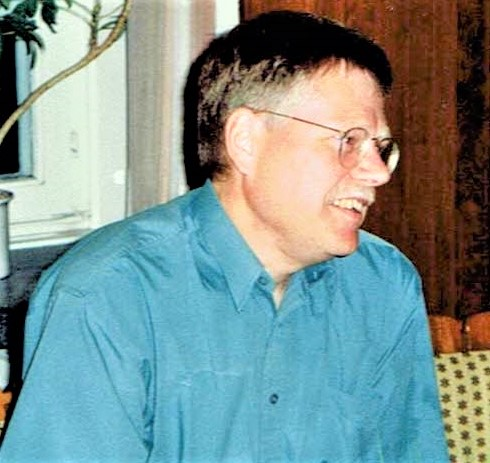
Franz Bosbach

Franz Bosbach (born 11 January 1952) is a German historian and retired university professor.

== Life ==
Bosbach was born in Bornheim, a small town situated on the left bank of the Rhine, between Cologne and Bonn.

He received his doctorate from Bonn University in 1981 for a study on the financial and economic aspects of the diplomatic service at the 1648 Peace of Westphalia. His habilitation (higher academic qualification), also from Bonn followed in 1986, this time for a piece of work entitled "Monarchia Universalis. Ein politischer Leitbegriff der frühen Neuzeit" ("Universal monarchy: a political precept for the early modern period"). Between 1987 and 1989 he was supported by a bursary from the German Research Foundation's Heisenberg Programme.

In 1989 Bosbach was appointed visiting fellow at Clare College, Cambridge. He held a chair in early modern history between 1989 and 2008 at the recently established University of Bayreuth, where between 2005 and 2008 he served as vice-president for study and teaching. Between 1995 and 2008 he was also "at the helm" of the Anglo-German (Coburg based) Prince Albert Society.

In 2008 he switched to the University of Duisburg-Essen where he was elected full-time vice-rector for study and teaching. His term in office ended in 2014. After that, he held a chair in early modern history until his retirement in 2018.

In 2012, he was awarded the German Federal Cross of Merit, First Class. In 2024, the University of Prešov awarded him the title of Dr.h.c.(Prešovská univerzita v Prešove).
