= Fritz G. A. Kraemer =

American military educator and advisor

Fritz Gustav Anton Kraemer (July 3, 1908 – September 8, 2003) was an American military educator and advisor. He was Senior Civilian Advisor to the Army Chief of Staff. He is often credited with discovering Henry Kissinger, with whom he maintained a close relationship, and Alexander Haig.

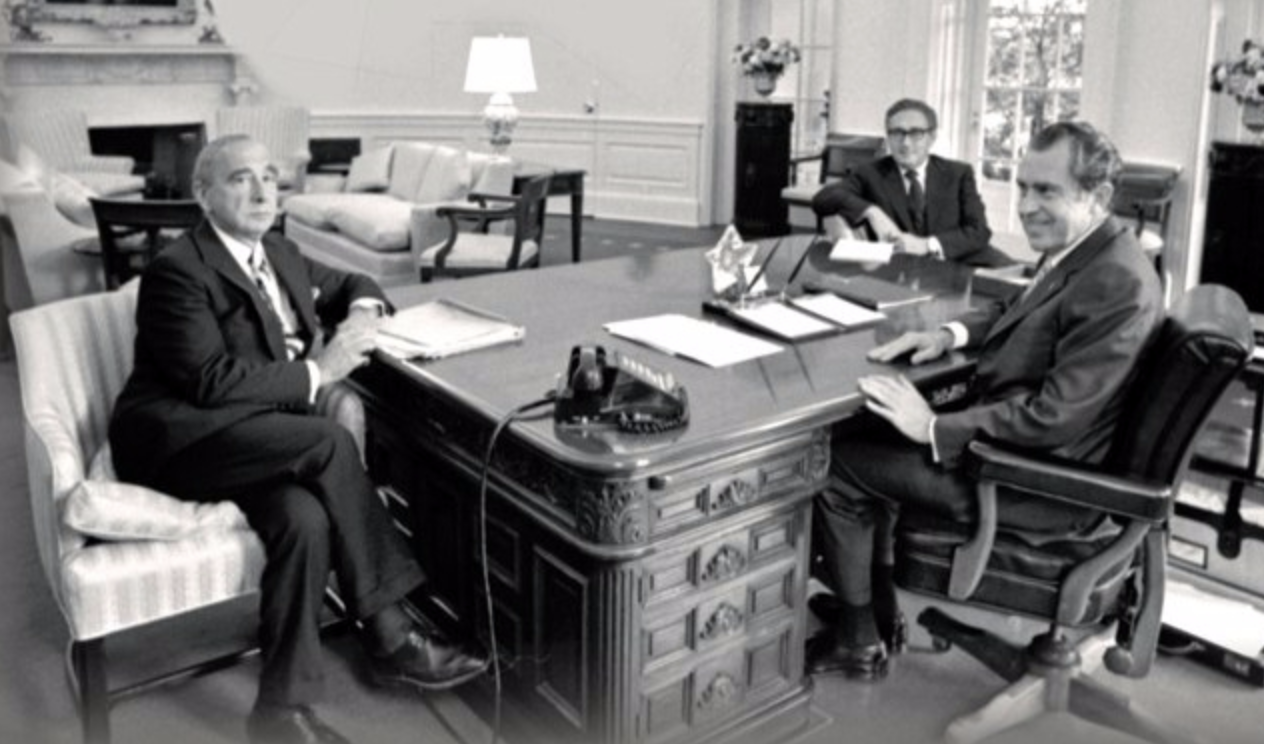
Pentagon Strategist Fritz G.A. Kraemer, National Security Advisor Henry Kissinger, and President of the United States of America Richard Nixon at the Oval Office, The White House in Washington DC.

== Early years ==
Kraemer was born in Essen, Germany, the eldest child of Jewish parents Georg Kraemer (born Berlin 1872, died Theresienstadt 1942) and Anna Johanna (Jennie) Kraemer, née Goldschmidt (born Essen 1886, died Washington DC 1971). His brother, William P. Kraemer, who became an analytical psychologist, was born in 1911. Later, his parents converted to Lutheran faith.

He studied at the famous Arndt Gymnasium in Berlin, the London School of Economics and the Universities of Geneva and Frankfurt before earning a doctorate in law at the University of Frankfurt in 1931 and a doctorate in Political Science at the University of Rome in 1934.

== League of Nations ==
During most of the 1930s he was Senior Legal Advisor to the League of Nations at the League’s Legal Institute in Rome. In 1933, he married his wife, Britta Bjorkander, a Swedish citizen.

== World War II ==
Kraemer, a Lutheran with a dislike for Nazis, escaped Nazi Germany for America in 1939, leaving behind his wife and son. He was drafted and became a U.S. citizen as an inductee and joined the United States Army in April 1943 ("with two PhDs and one monocle") as an infantryman in the 84th Infantry Division (the "Railsplitter"). His time served at Camp Ritchie classifies him as one of the thousands of Ritchie Boys.

Kraemer fought in the Battle of the Bulge and in the battles of the Ruhr and Rhineland, earning a Battlefield Commission and a Bronze Star in the liberation of his former homeland. In 1945 Kraemer was reunited with his wife and son and returned to Washington, DC, in 1947. He left active duty in 1948 and retired from the Army Reserve in 1963 with the rank of lieutenant colonel.

== University teacher, Pentagon strategist, and White House advisor ==
A gifted talent scout and teacher, in 1944 he discovered young Henry Kissinger, whom Kraemer had recruited into Army division. Kraemer persuaded Kissinger to attend Harvard University. "Kraemer shaped my reading and thinking, influenced my choice of college, awakened my interest in political philosophy and history, inspired both my undergraduate and graduate theses and became an integral and indispensable part of my life" Kissinger said.

In 1961 Kraemer also discovered Alexander Haig, and in 1969 Kraemer recommended Haig as the Military Assistant to then National Security Advisor Kissinger. Sven Kraemer, Fritz G. A. Kraemer's son, also served in the Nixon-Kissinger National Security Council.

From the early 1950s until 1978, when Kraemer retired from civil service, he served as Senior Civilian Advisor to the U.S. Army Chief of Staff in the Pentagon and influenced the Department of Defense during the Cold War. During his time at the Pentagon, he also influenced Secretaries of Defense James R. Schlesinger and Donald Rumsfeld. He served on the White House national security staff under 10 presidents.

A graduate of the U.S. National War College, Kraemer advised, taught, and inspired generations of officers, officials, American Presidents, as well as private citizens.

Kraemer was described as the real Dr Strangelove and Kissinger's Kissinger. He was always flamboyant and eccentric. Kraemer wore a monocle and it became his trademark.

== Death ==
Kraemer died at the age of 95 on September 8, 2003, in Washington, D.C., and was buried with full military honors in Arlington National Cemetery on October 8. He was honored by former Secretary of Defense James R. Schlesinger and his former students Henry Kissinger and Alexander Haig. “He stimulated my thoughts because he had all these experiences and insights,” Schlesinger said. Former Secretary of Defence Donald Rumsfeld referred Kraemer as "a true keeper of the flame". Kissinger said that Kraemer was "the greatest single influence of my formative years. An extraordinary man who will be part of my life as long as I draw breath."

== Publications ==
- True Keeper of the Holy Flame - The Legacy of Pentagon Strategist and Mentor Dr Fritz Kraemer, by Hubertus Hoffmann with contributions from Henry Kissinger, Alexander Haig, Donald Rumsfeld, and others. 384 pages, Verlag Inspiration Un Limited, London/Berlin 2012, ISBN 978-3-9812110-5-4.
- Fritz Kraemer on Excellence, by Hubertus Hoffmann with contributions from Henry Kissinger, Alexander Haig, Donald Rumsfeld, and others. New York: World Security Network Foundation, 2004.
- The Forty Years War, by Len Colodny and Tom Shachtman. New York: Harper/Collins, 2009.
