= Reich law =

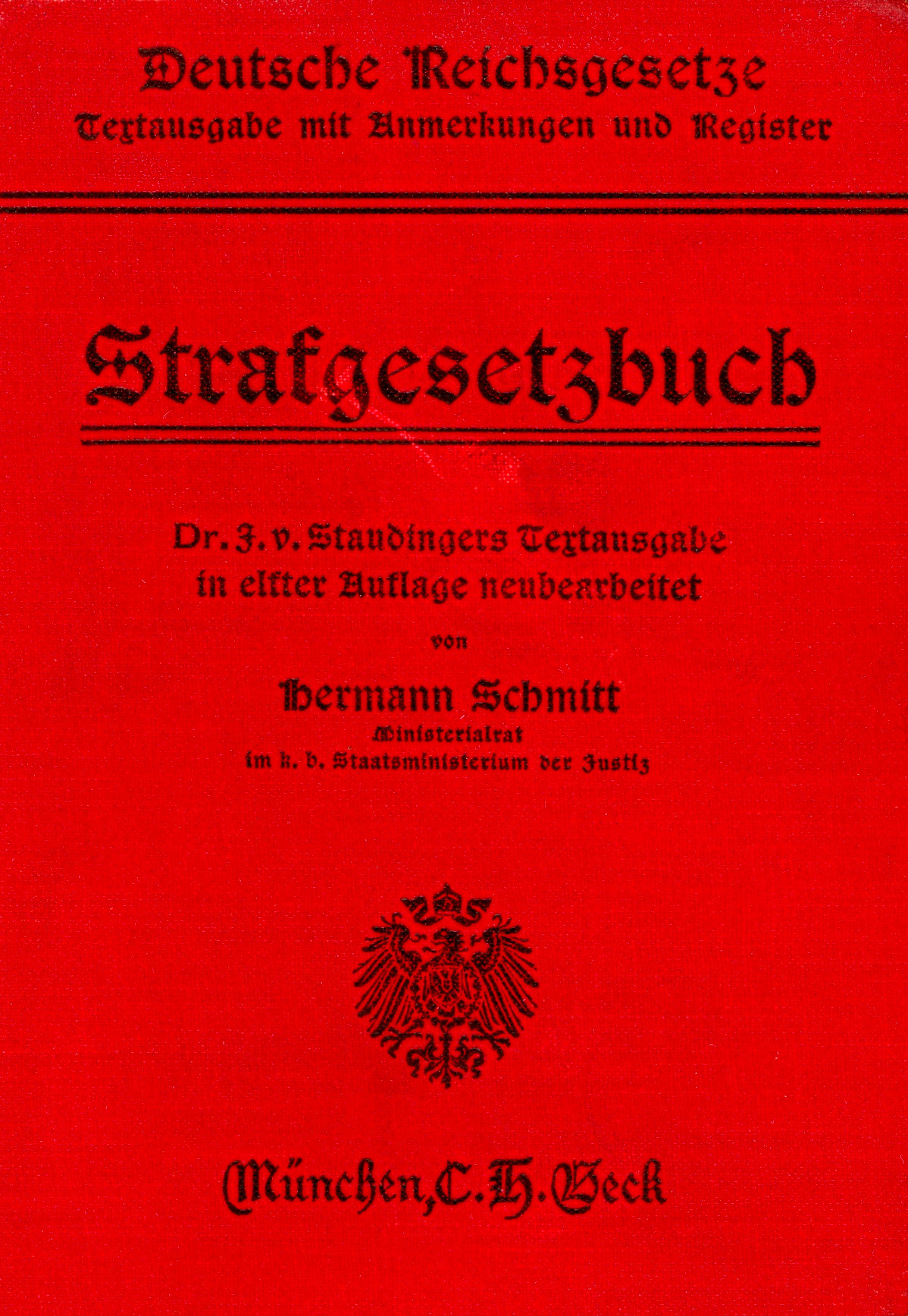
German penal code (from pre II. World War but edited after)

A Reich law is a law which is made for an entire realm, and decided on at the national level. In modern Germany such laws are called federal laws.

== An overview of Germany ==
Up until 1806 Reich laws were made by the Imperial Diet of the Holy Roman Empire. The right to propose such laws was exclusive to the Holy Roman Emperor and the Prince-elector. Every proposal was firstly discussed by the Prince-electorate and after their appraisal it got passed onto the imperial Council of princes after which it reached the free imperial cities. For the law to officially come into effect they had to be approved by the Emperor.

In 1871 the German Reich which developed out of the North German Confederation of 1867 as a Nation state. The laws of the confederation were taken over and from then on called Reich laws.

First, the Reichstag of the German Empire decided on the laws, which later had to be reviewed by the Bundesrat (German Empire) which represented the separate federal states and finally passed and announced to the public by the German Emperor. The Emperor could not make any adjustments at this stage, he was obligated by law to announce the new laws in their agreed-upon state.

All the laws that were decided in the times of the German empire, the Weimar Republic, and Nazi Germany still apply in modern Germany as long as they aren’t in violation of the Basic Law for the Federal Republic of Germany.

== Reich constitutional act in the holy roman empire ==
The Reich laws have their origins in the laws of the Holy Roman Empire, which were widely accepted as fundamental laws at that time and which were written and adjusted over centuries. Not all of the laws of the Holy Roman Empire were carried over into the new imperial constitution since they were not uniformly accepted.

In the first Constitutional law, agreed upon in the Concordat of Worms in 1122, there was already a certain independence of the secular and religious powers; one of the first steps on a long path towards solving the Investiture Controversy. The changing of a chief to a duke in the Holy Roman Empire around a century later is seen as a milestone in constitutional law. In 1231 the Emperor Frederick II had to concede dukedom laws to the Reich dukes at the Reichstag in Worms. Frederick II recognized the duke’s right to create laws the same day.

The most important constitutional law was the Golden Bull of 1356. It was the basis for the orderly election of a king. It restricted the right to feud and limited the number of prince electors while denying the pope any sort of influence on legislative matters.

The German Concord of the year 1447 was seen as a third Reich law. This law dictated the influence and freedom that decisions from the pope had in the Reich. This new Reich law set the foundation for the position and development of the Catholic church in the Holy Roman Empire over the following years.

The fourth Imperial Constitutional Law was the perpetual peace act which was published in the Reichstag in Worms on the 7th August 1495. The Imperial Chamber Court was formed to consolidate the act. Through this foundational new law the right to feud was also prohibited, which had been commonly allowed up until then in order ton push through a nationwide monopoly on the use of force for the state. Disputes within the nobility and the right to enforce laws by the nobility themselves was also prohibited. These issues were solved by a local court from that point onward. Should the perpetual peace be broken, the lawbreaker would face an Imperial Ban or a high fine.

The fifth Imperial Constitutional Law was the Imperial Military Constitution decided in Worms in 1521. This law was a directory of the people with power in the Reich, which was used to manage the maintenance of the imperial military.

Other laws and decrees which were pronounced Reich Laws included the Peace of Augsburg from 1555, "the Imperial enforce decree" and the "decree for the imperial privy council".

The Peace of Westphalia was an agreement which was made after the ratification bill had been exchanged in 1694 and was established as the eternal fundamental law of the Reich. Many territorial changes and local sovereignty were put into effect with this contract, while Reformed Christianity was declared a fully fledged religious denomination. Because of this, more rules on religious freedom and other imperial religious institutions were put in place. With all of this the founding of the Reich Constitution was fully completed.

== Legislative powers of the Reich ==
The constitution of the German Empire under Bismarck secured the legislative powers of the Reich in the following areas so laws could be passed:

- Citizenship law
- Custom duties and trade
- Banking law
- Patent law
- Ownership law
- Protection of trade and shipping in foreign countries, as well as consultation systems
- Railway and waterway construction
- Ship and waterway maintenance in interstate waterways, as well as river and water custom duties
- Postal and telegraph systems
- Cross-country enforcement of civil rights
- Law of public documents
- Debt, criminal, trade and jurisdiction laws
- Naval and military matters on a national level
- Medical and veterinary police rights
- Association/club and press rights

In many of these areas the legislative powers of the Reich did not apply in Bavaria, which had the right to pass its own laws. In Württemberg, this was the case in postal and telegraph matters.

The constitution was valid until it was replaced by the constitution of the Weimar Republic.

== Differences in the state laws ==
Apart from the general Reich laws, there were different legislation systems in the various countries of the German Empire. At first, there was no catalogue containing the fundamental human rights. Surprisingly, this lack of fundamental rights in the constitution had low impact. Therefore, only the constitutions of the countries guaranteed fundamental human rights.

Various Reich laws in the Kingdom of Bavaria were taken over from laws of the North German Confederation or other regions. They mainly included political and human rights.

In the Kingdom of Prussia the Reich laws had priority over the state laws. The representatives of the states decided on these binding laws and published them by means of the Reichsgesetzblatt.
