= Hans-Helmuth Knütter =

German politician (born 1934)

Hans-Helmuth Knütter (born 9 May 1934) is a German political scientist and politician for the Christian Democratic Union. He habilitated with the work "Die Juden und die deutsche Linke in der Weimarer Republik 1918-1933". Knütter was one of the many doctoral students of Karl Dietrich Bracher. From 1972 on, Knütter worked as professor at the University of Bonn und until 1996 managed the Seminar of Political Science there. Knütter was given the emeritus status in 1997. From 1985 to 1989, Knütter was a member of the Advisory Council of the Federal Agency for Civic Education (Bundeszentrale für politische Bildung, (BpB)). From 1989 to 1994, he acted as a rapporteur for the Interior Ministry of the Federal Republic of Germany and of the BpB.

In the 1970s Knütter's works covered the complex interrelationship of Jewry and left-wing politics; studying totalitarianism, he noted the anti-liberal and anti-pluralistic traits of far-right thinking (Reichling, 1993).

Critics have stated that from the early 1990s on, Knütter reflects right-wing conservative views; he has also been publishing in newspapers like Junge Freiheit. Knütter's work focuses on political extremism, and his recent publications mostly criticize left-wing extremism. In co-authorship with Stefan Winckler, he has published the work A Handbook of Left-Wing Extremism - an Underestimated Danger ("Handbuch des Linksextremismus - Die unterschätzte Gefahr"), in which the authors claim that the activities of the potentially violent leftist militants - unlike those of the right-wing and far-right spectrum - are not paid due attention by the public. Knütter's own positions, on the other hand, have also been questioned, and his right-wing connections mentioned in the yearly reports of the Office for the Protection of Constitution of North Rhine Westphalia. Knütter's most recent publication is "Antifascism: the Mental Civil War" ("Antifaschismus : der geistige Bürgerkrieg"), published by the German right-wing association Die Deutschen Konservativen.

Knütter is a regular writer for the right-wing newspaper Junge Freiheit and a speaker for the far-right registered association Gesellschaft für freie Publizistik. He was criticised in the latter capacity for holding speeches in front of "NPD-functionaries, violent neo-Nazis, and Auschwitz deniers", calling for "brawls and street battles" in the name of one's political ideals.

In 2000, Knütter held a speech at the Landtag of Baden-Württemberg through the Republicans. CDU, SPD, the Greens and FDP subsequently sought for his removal from the expert guest speaker list of the internal committee.

== Literature ==
- Uwe Backes, Eckhard Jesse (Hrsg.): Jahrbuch Extremismus & Demokratie (E & D) Nomos Verlag, 2003. ISBN 3-8329-0348-8
- Norbert Reichling: Der Antifaschismus als Grundtorheit unserer Epoche? Zu Risiken und Nebenwirkungen der „wehrhaften Demokratie“, in: Vorgänge. Zeitschrift für Bürgerrechte und Gesellschaftspolitik, Heft 124 (Dezember 1993), S. 38-53 - online unter http://www.humanistische-union.de/publikationen/vorgaenge/online_artikel/online_artikel_detail/browse/16/back/nach-autoren/article/antifaschismus-als-grundtorheit-unserer-eoche/
