= Arnold Brecht =

Government official in the Weimar Republic

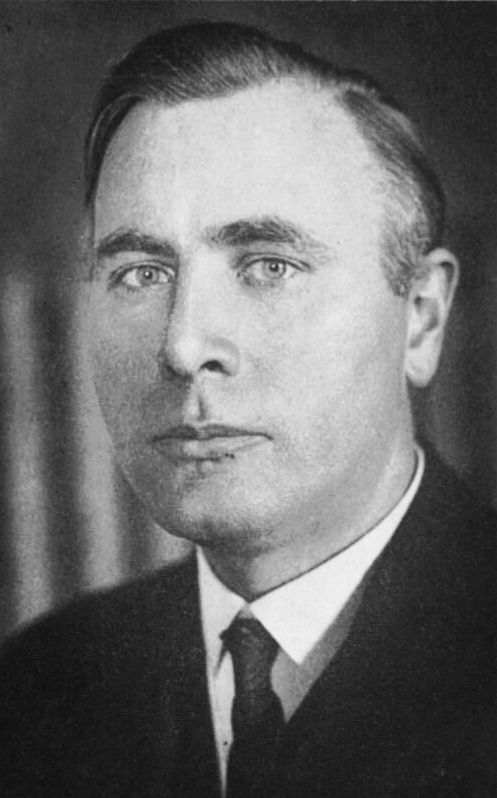

Personal details
- Born: 26 January 1884 Lübeck, German Empire
- Died: 11 September 1977 (aged 93) Eutin, West Germany
- Education: University of Göttingen
- Occupation: Government official
- Profession: Jurist

Arnold Brecht (26 January 1884 – 11 September 1977) was a German jurist and one of the leading government officials in the Weimar Republic. He was one of the few democratically minded high-placed officials that opposed the Machtergreifung in 1933.

An alumnus of the University of Göttingen, Brecht served as a government official from 1918 to 1933. He was dismissed from his post shortly after the Nazi seizure of power, and emigrated to the United States. He became a lecturer at The New School, and also a foreign policy adviser to the United States government.

After World War II he returned to Germany and helped drafting the Basic Law for the Federal Republic of Germany. In 1959 he received the Federal Cross of Merit.

Brecht also made contributions to political science. Brecht's law is the academic basis for one of the components of the equalization payments between the states of Germany.

== Selected publications ==
- ——— (1944), Prelude to silence: The end of the German republic, New York: Oxford University Press
- ——— (1959), Political Theory: The Foundations of Twentieth-Century Political Thought, Princeton: Princeton University Press
- ——— (1970), The political education of Arnold Brecht: An autobiography, 1884–1970, Princeton: Princeton University Press
- ——— (1971), Federalism and regionalism in Germany : The division of Prussia, New York: Russell & Russell
- Forkosch, Morris D., ed. (1954), The political philosophy of Arnold Brecht: Essays, New York: New School for Social Research
