= 1930s =

Decade of the Gregorian calendar (1930–1939)

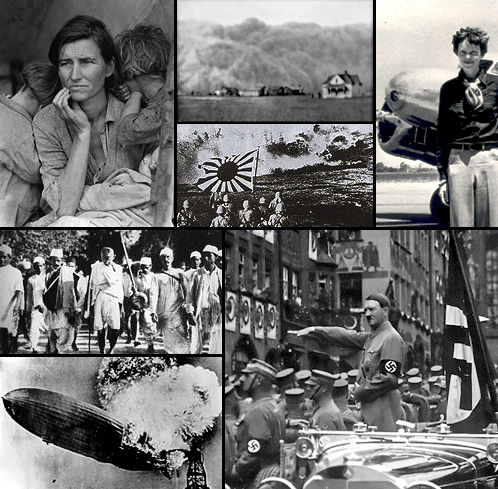
From left, clockwise: Dorothea Lange's photo of the homeless Florence Thompson shows the effects of the Great Depression; Due to extreme drought conditions, farms across the south-central United States become dry and the Dust Bowl spreads; The Empire of Japan invades China, which eventually leads to the Second Sino-Japanese War. In 1937, Japanese soldiers massacre civilians in Nanjing; Aviator Amelia Earhart becomes an American flight icon; German dictator Adolf Hitler and the Nazi Party attempt to establish a New Order of German hegemony in Europe, which culminates in 1939 when Germany invades Poland, leading to the outbreak of World War II. The Nazis also persecute Jews in Germany, specifically with Kristallnacht in 1938; The Hindenburg explodes over a small New Jersey airfield, causing 36 deaths and effectively ending commercial airship travel; Mohandas Gandhi walks to the Arabian Sea in the Salt March of 1930.

The 1930s (pronounced "nineteen-thirties"; shortened to the "'30s" and referred to as the "Thirties") was the decade that began on January 1, 1930 and ended on December 31, 1939. In the United States, the Dust Bowl led to the nickname the "Dirty Thirties".

The decade was defined by a global economic and political crisis that culminated in the Second World War. It saw the collapse of the international financial system, beginning with the Wall Street crash of 1929, the largest stock market crash in American history. The subsequent economic downfall, called the Great Depression, had traumatic social effects worldwide, leading to widespread poverty and unemployment, especially in the economic superpower of the United States and in Germany, which was already struggling with the payment of reparations for the First World War. The Dust Bowl in the United States (which led to the nickname the "Dirty Thirties") exacerbated the scarcity of wealth. U.S. President Franklin D. Roosevelt, who took office in 1933, introduced a program of broad-scale social reforms and stimulus plans called the New Deal in response to the crisis. The Soviet Union's second five-year plan gave heavy industry top priority, putting the Soviet Union not far behind Germany as one of the major steel-producing countries of the world, while also improving communications. First-wave feminism made advances, with women gaining the right to vote in South Africa (1930, whites only), Brazil (1933), and Cuba (1933). Following the rise of Adolf Hitler and the emergence of the NSDAP as the country's sole legal party in 1933, Germany imposed a series of laws which discriminated against Jews and other ethnic minorities.

Germany adopted an aggressive foreign policy, remilitarizing the Rhineland (1936), annexing Austria (1938) and the Sudetenland (1938), before invading Poland (1939) and starting World War II near the end of the decade. Italy likewise continued its already aggressive foreign policy, defeating the Libyan resistance (1932) before invading Ethiopia (1935) and then Albania (1939). Both Germany and Italy became involved in the Spanish Civil War, supporting the eventually victorious Nationalists led by Francisco Franco against the Republicans, who were in turn supported by the Soviet Union. The Chinese Civil War was halted due to the need to confront Japanese imperial ambitions, with the Kuomintang and the Chinese Communist Party forming a Second United Front to fight Japan in the Second Sino-Japanese War. Lesser conflicts included interstate wars such as the Colombia–Peru War (1932–1933), the Chaco War (1932–1935) and the Saudi–Yemeni War (1934), as well as internal conflicts in Brazil (1932), Ecuador (1932), El Salvador (1932), Austria (1934) and British Palestine (1936–1939).

Severe famine took place in the major grain-producing areas of the Soviet Union between 1930 and 1933, leading to 5.7 to 8.7 million deaths. Major contributing factors to the famine include: the forced collectivization in the Soviet Union of agriculture as a part of the First Five-Year Plan, forced grain procurement, combined with rapid industrialization, a decreasing agricultural workforce, and several severe droughts. A famine of similar scope also took place in China from 1936 to 1937, killing 5 million people. The 1931 China floods caused 422,499–4,000,000 deaths. Major earthquakes of this decade include the 1935 Quetta earthquake (30,000–60,000 deaths) and the 1939 Erzincan earthquake (32,700–32,968 deaths).

With the advent of sound film in 1927, the musical—the genre best placed to showcase the new technology—took over as the most popular type of film with audiences, with the animated musical fantasy film Snow White and the Seven Dwarfs (1937) becoming the highest-grossing film of this decade in terms of gross rentals. In terms of distributor rentals, Gone with the Wind (1939), an epic historical romance film, was the highest-grossing film of this decade and remains the highest-grossing film (when adjusted for inflation) to this day. Popularity of comedy films boomed after the Silent era with popular comedians The Three Stooges and Marx Brothers. Popular novels of this decade include the historical fiction novels The Good Earth, Anthony Adverse and Gone with the Wind, all three of which were best-selling novels in the United States for 2 consecutive years. Cole Porter was a popular music artist in the 1930s, with two of his songs, "Night and Day" and "Begin the Beguine" becoming No. 1 hits in 1932 and 1935 respectively. The latter song was of the Swing genre, which had begun to emerge as the most popular form of music in the United States since 1933.

The world population increased from 2.05 to 2.25 billion people during the decade, with about 750 million births and 550 million deaths.

== Politics and wars ==
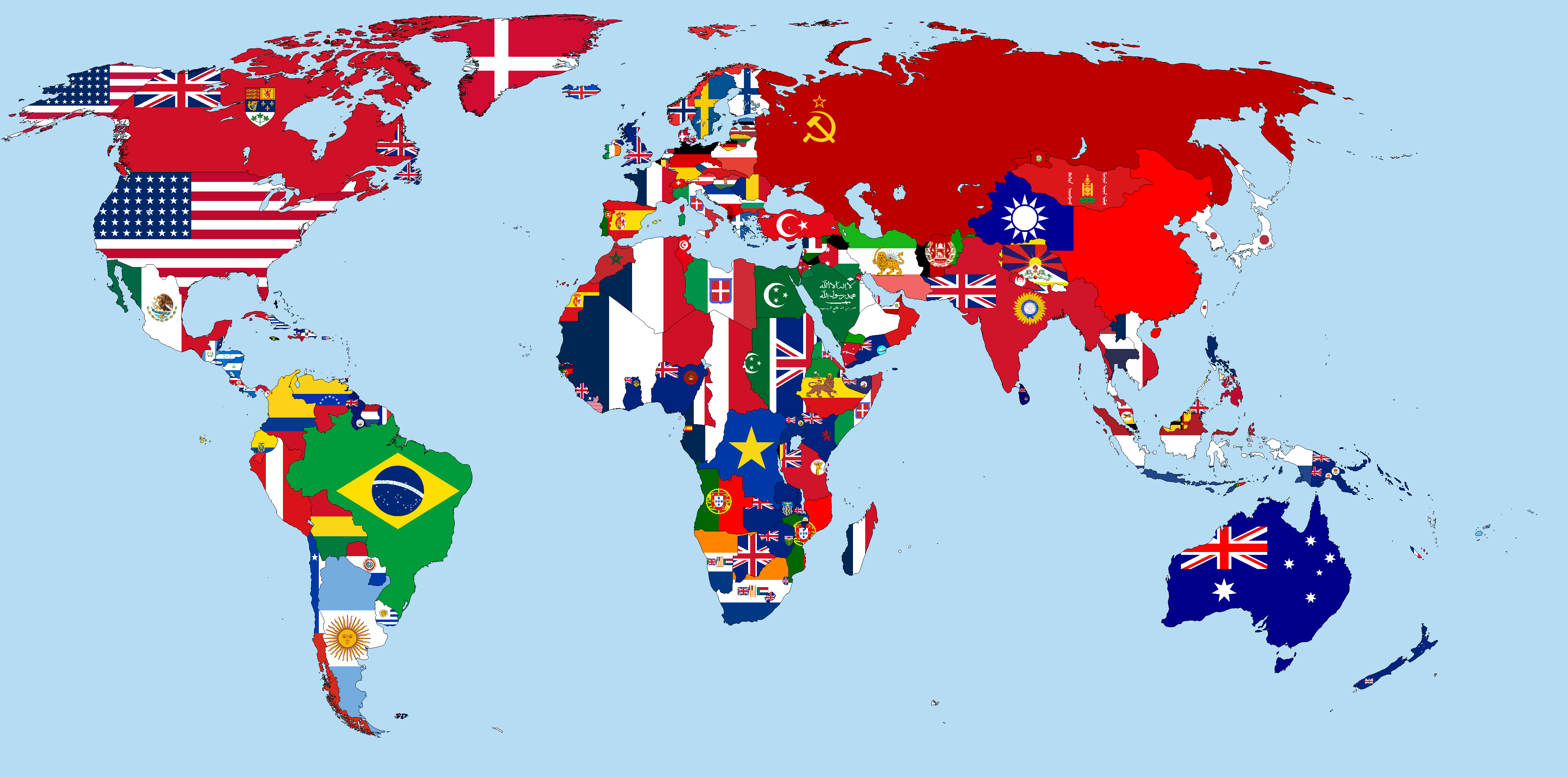
Flag map of the world from 1930, nine years before World War II

=== Wars ===
At the outbreak of World War II, both Nazi Germany and the Soviet Union invaded Poland; by October 1939, they had divided the occupied territory between them in accordance with the secret part of the Molotov–Ribbentrop Pact.

- Colombia–Peru War (September 1, 1932 – May 24, 1933) – fought between the Republic of Colombia and the Republic of Peru
- Chaco War (June 15, 1932 – June 10, 1935) – fought between Bolivia and Paraguay over the disputed territory of Gran Chaco, resulting in a Paraguayan victory in 1935; an agreement dividing the territory was made in 1938, formally ending the conflict
- Saudi–Yemeni War (March 1934 – May 12, 1934) – fought between Saudi Arabia and the Mutawakkilite Kingdom of Yemen
- Second Italo-Ethiopian War (October 3, 1935 – February 19, 1937)
- Second Sino-Japanese War (July 7, 1937 – September 9, 1945) – fought between the Republic of China and the Empire of Japan. It was the largest Asian war of the 20th century, and made up more than 50% of the casualties in the Pacific theater of World War II.
- World War II (September 1, 1939 – September 2, 1945) – global war centered in Europe and the Pacific but involving the majority of the world's countries, including all of the major powers such as Germany, Russia, America, Italy, Japan, France and the United Kingdom.

=== Internal conflicts ===
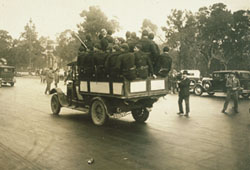
- Soldiers mobilizing during the 1930 Argentine coup.
  Chinese Civil War (1927–1949) – The ruling Kuomintang and the rebel Chinese Communist Party fought a civil war for control of China. The Communists consolidated territory in the early 1930s and proclaimed a short-lived Chinese Soviet Republic that collapsed upon Kuomintang attacks, forcing a mass retreat known as the Long March. The Kuomintang and Communists attempted to put away their differences after 1937 to fight the Japanese invasion of China, but intermittent clashes continued through the remainder of the 1930s. Even with some clashes they all fought the Japanese.
- 1936–1939 Arab revolt in Palestine.
- Spanish Civil War (July 17, 1936 – April 1, 1939) – Germany and Italy backed the anti-communist Falange forces of Francisco Franco. The Soviet Union and international communist parties (see Abraham Lincoln Brigade) backed the left-wing republican faction in the war. The war ended in April 1939 with Franco's nationalist forces defeating the republican forces. Franco became Head of State of Spain and President of Government, and the Republic of Spain gave way to the Spanish State, an authoritarian dictatorship.
- The Argentine government of Hipólito Yrigoyen is overthrown by forces loyal to General José Féliz Uriburu in 1930, the coup marked the start of the Infamous Decade.

=== Major political changes ===
==== Germany – Rise of Nazism ====
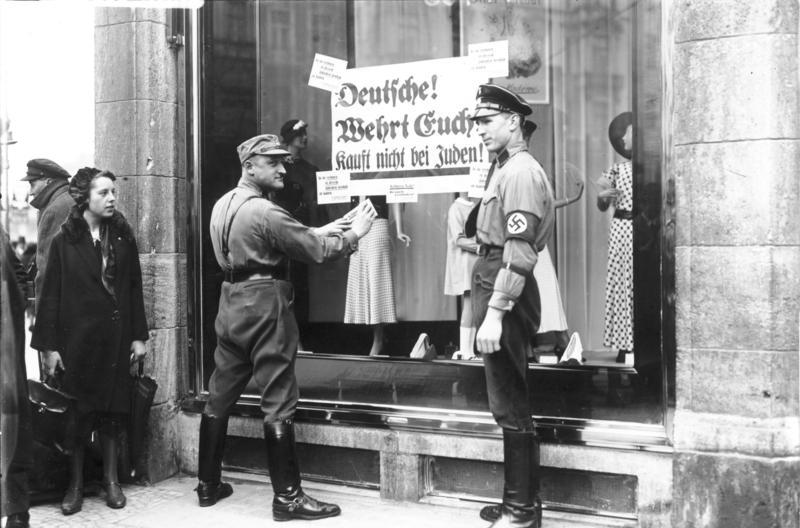
SA paramilitaries outside a Berlin store during the Nazi boycott of Jewish businesses, 1933

- The NSDAP (Nazi Party) under Adolf Hitler wins the German federal election, March 1933. Hitler becomes Chancellor of Germany. The Night of the Long Knives purge results in at least 85 casualties. Following the 1934 death in office of Paul von Hindenburg, President of Germany, Hitler's cabinet passes a law proclaiming the presidency vacant and transferring the role and powers of the head of state to Hitler, hereafter known as Führer und Reichskanzler (leader and chancellor). The Weimar Republic effectively gives way to Nazi Germany, a totalitarian autocratic national socialist dictatorship committed to repudiating the Treaty of Versailles, persecuting and removing Jews and other minorities from German society, expanding Germany's territory, and opposing the spread of communism.
- Hitler pulls Germany out of the League of Nations, but hosts the 1936 Summer Olympics to show his new Reich to the world as well as the supposed superior athleticism of his Aryan troops/athletes.
- Neville Chamberlain, Prime Minister of the United Kingdom (1937–1940), attempts the appeasement of Hitler in hope of avoiding war by allowing the dictator to annex the Sudetenland (the German-speaking regions of Czechoslovakia) and later signing the Munich Agreement and promising constituents "Peace for our time". He is ousted in favor of Winston Churchill in May 1940, following the German invasion of Norway.
- The assassination of the German diplomat Ernst vom Rath by a German-born Polish Jew triggers the Kristallnacht ("Night of Broken Glass") which occurred between 9 and 10 November 1938, carried out by the Hitler Youth, the Gestapo, and the SS, during which much of the Jewish population living in Nazi Germany and Austria was attacked – 91 Jews were murdered, and between 25,000 and 30,000 more were arrested and sent to Nazi concentration camps. Some 267 synagogues were destroyed, and thousands of homes and businesses were ransacked. Kristallnacht also served as the pretext for the wholesale confiscation of firearms from German Jews.
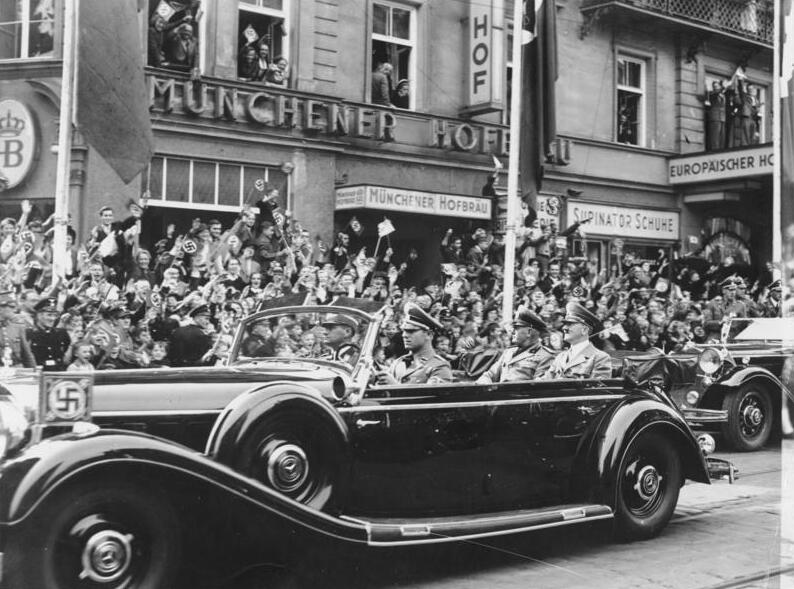
  Cheering crowds greet Adolf Hitler and Benito Mussolini in Munich, 1938
- Germany and Italy pursue territorial expansionist agendas. Germany demands the annexation of the Federal State of Austria and of other German-speaking territories in Europe. Between 1935 and 1936, Germany recovers the Saar and re-militarizes the Rhineland. Italy initially opposes Germany's aims for Austria, but in 1936 the two countries resolve their differences in the aftermath of Italy's diplomatic isolation following the start of the Second Italo-Abyssinian War, and Germany becomes Italy's only remaining ally. Germany and Italy improve relations by forming an alliance against communism in 1936 with the signing of the Anti-Comintern Pact. Germany annexes Austria in the Anschluss; the annexation of the Sudetenland follows negotiations which result in the Munich Agreement of 1938. The Italian invasion of Albania in 1939 succeeds in turning the Kingdom of Albania into an Italian protectorate. The vacant Albanian throne is claimed by Victor Emmanuel III of Italy. Germany receives the Memel territory from Lithuania, occupies what remains of Czechoslovakia, and finally invades the Second Polish Republic, the last of these events resulting in the outbreak of World War II.
- In 1939, several countries of the Americas, including Canada, Cuba, and the United States, controversially deny asylum to hundreds of German Jewish refugees on board the MS St. Louis who are fleeing the Nazi regime's racist agenda of anti-Semitic persecution in Germany. In the end, certain European countries accept the refugees, and the ship returns to Germany with no passengers on board.

==== United States – Combating the Depression ====
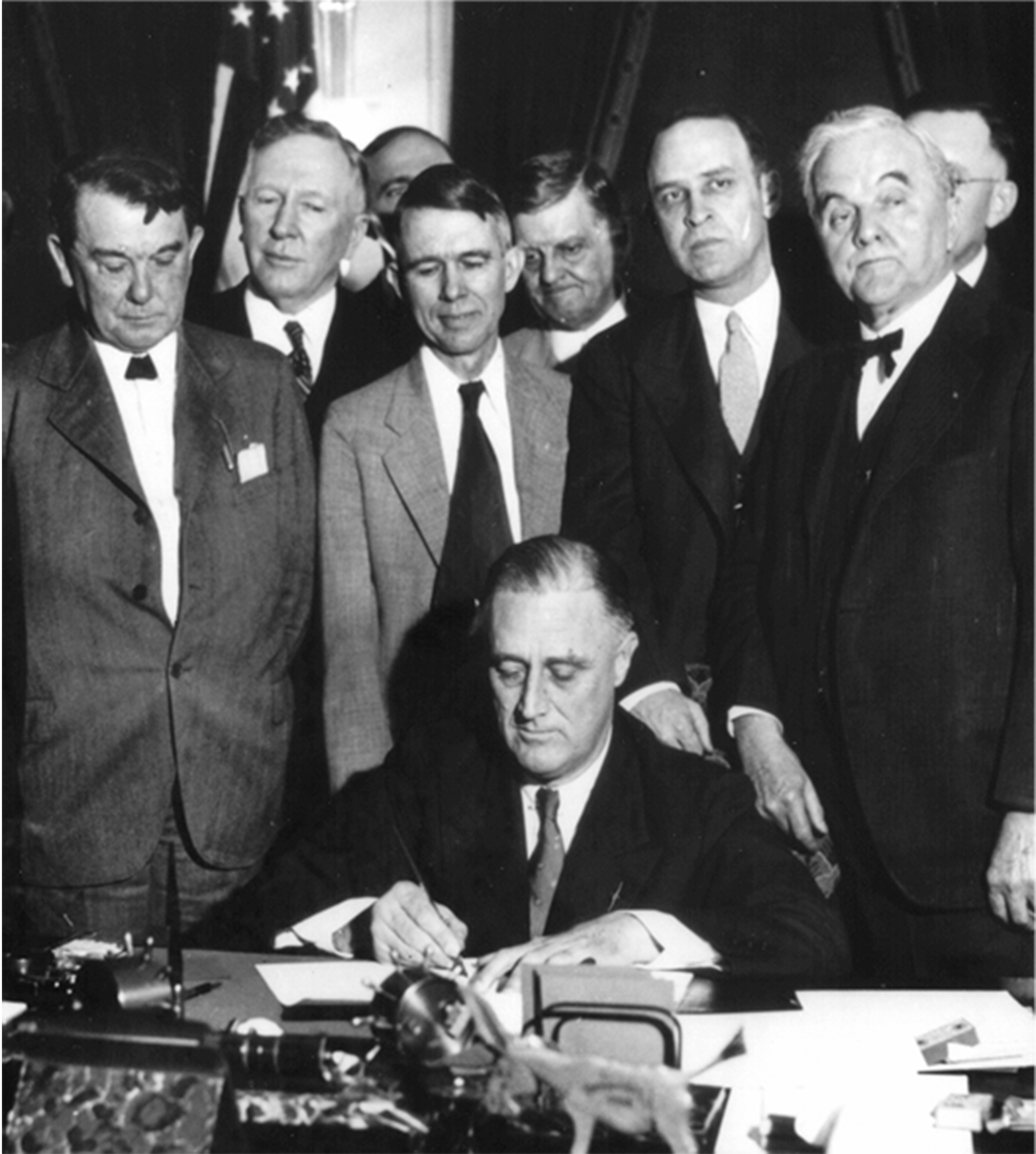
New Deal: President Franklin D. Roosevelt signs the Tennessee Valley Authority Act, May 18, 1933

- Franklin D. Roosevelt is elected President of the United States in November 1932. Roosevelt initiates a widespread social welfare strategy called the "New Deal" to combat the economic and social devastation of the Great Depression. The economic agenda of the "New Deal" was a radical departure from previous laissez-faire economics.

==== Saudi Arabia – Founding ====
- The Kingdom of Hejaz and Nejd is proclaimed the Kingdom of Saudi Arabia, concluding the country's unification under the rule of Ibn Saud.

==== Spain – Turmoil and Civil War ====
- The Republican parties win the local elections, and proclaim the Second Republic, kicking out the monarchy of Alfonso XIII of Borbón.
- The Spanish coup of July 1936 against the Republic marks the beginning of the Spanish Civil War.

=== Colonization ===
- The Ethiopian Empire is invaded by the Kingdom of Italy during the Second Italo-Abyssinian War from 1935 to 1936. The occupied territory merges with Eritrea and Italian Somaliland into the colony of Italian East Africa.
- The Empire of Japan captures Manchuria in 1931, creating the puppet state of Manchukuo. A puppet government was created, with Puyi, the last Qing dynasty Emperor of China, installed as the nominal regent and emperor.

=== Decolonization and independence ===
- In March 1930 Mohandas Gandhi leads the non-violent Satyagraha movement in the Declaration of the Independence of India and the Salt March.
- The Government of India Act 1935 creates new directly elected bodies, although with a limited franchise, and increases the autonomy of the Presidencies and provinces of British India.
- The Anglo-Egyptian treaty of 1936 is signed which gradually decreased British influence in Egypt and increased Egyptian sovereignty. It led to the withdrawal of British troops across Egypt to the Suez Canal Zone and decreased the number of British troops in the country to 10,000 men.

=== Other prominent political events ===
- The Great Depression seriously affects the economic, political, and social aspects of society across the world.
- The League of Nations collapses as countries like Germany, the Kingdom of Italy, and the Empire of Japan abdicate the League.

==== Europe ====
Soviet famine of 1930–1933. Starved peasants in the streets of Kharkiv, 1933

- In 1930, Miguel Primo de Rivera, Prime Minister of Spain and head of a military dictatorship is forced to resign in response to a financial crisis (part of the Great Depression). Alfonso XIII of Spain, who had previously backed the dictatorship, attempts to return gradually to the previous system and restore his prestige. This failed utterly, as the King was considered a supporter of the dictatorship, and more and more political forces called for the establishment of a republic. In 1931, republican and socialist parties won a major victory in the local elections, while the monarchists were in decline. Street riots ensued, calling for the removal of the monarchy. The Spanish Army declared that they would not defend the King. Alfonso flees the country, effectively abdicating and ending the Bourbon Restoration phase which had started in the 1870s. A Second Spanish Republic emerges.
- In the Soviet Union, agricultural collectivization and rapid industrialization take place. Millions died during the Holodomor.
- More than 25 million people migrate to cities in the Soviet Union.
- Anglo-German Naval Agreement is signed in 1935, removing the Treaty of Versailles' level of limitation on the size of the Kriegsmarine (navy). The agreement allows Germany to build a larger naval force.
- Éamon de Valera introduces a new constitution for the Irish Free State in 1937, effectively ending its status as a British Dominion.
- The Silver Jubilee of George V was celebrated on 6 May 1935 to mark 25 years of King George V as the King of the United Kingdom and the British Dominions, and Emperor of India. It was the first ever Silver Jubilee celebration of any British monarch in history.
- The "Great Purge" of "Old Bolsheviks" from the Communist Party of the Soviet Union takes place from 1936 to 1938, as ordered by Soviet Union leader Joseph Stalin, resulting in hundreds of thousands of people being killed. This purge was due to mistrust and political differences, as well as the massive drop in grain produce. This was due to the method of collectivization in Russia. The Soviet Union produced 16 million lbs of grain less in 1934 compared to 1930. This led to the starvation of millions of Russians.
- The Abdication of Edward VIII in 1936, gives the British Crown to George VI, 325 days after the death of his father George V. The Coronation of George VI and Elizabeth takes place in May 1937.
- The 1937 World's Fair in Paris displays the growing political tensions in Europe. The pavilions of the rival countries of Nazi Germany and the Soviet Union face each other. Germany at the time was internationally condemned for Luftwaffe (its air force) having performed a bombing of the Basque town of Guernica in Spain during the Spanish Civil War. Spanish artist Pablo Picasso depicted the bombing in his masterpiece painting Guernica at the World Fair, which was a surrealist depiction of the horror of the bombing.
- Referendum in the Irish Free State in December 1937 on whether Ireland should continue to be a constitutional monarchy under King George VI or to become a republic results in citizens voting in favour of a republic, ending the remains of British sovereignty through monarchial authority over the state.

==== Africa ====
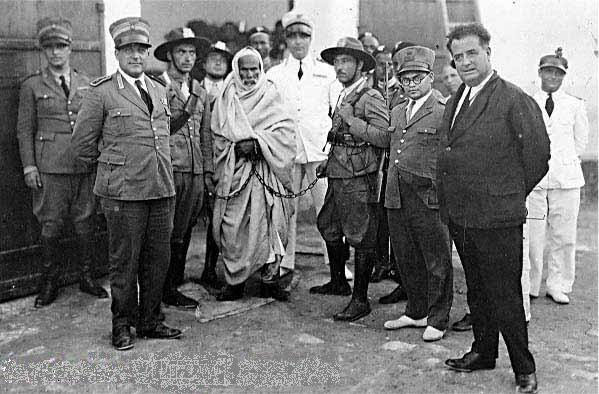
Senussi rebel leader Omar al-Mukhtar after his arrest by Italian armed forces in 1931

- J. B. M. Hertzog of South Africa, whose National Party had won the 1929 election alone after splitting with the Labour Party, received much of the blame for the devastating economic impact of the Depression.

==== Americas ====
- Canada and other dominions under the British Empire sign the Statute of Westminster in 1931, establishing effective parliamentary independence of Canada from the parliament of the United Kingdom.
- 1939 New York World's Fair, the USA displays the pavilions showing art, culture, and technology from the whole world.
- Newfoundland voluntarily returns to British colonial rule in 1934 amid its economic crisis during the Great Depression with the creation of the Commission of Government, a non-elected body.
- Canadian Prime Minister W. L. Mackenzie King meets with German Führer Adolf Hitler in 1937 in Berlin. King is the only North American head of government to meet with Hitler.
- Amelia Earhart receives major attention in the 1930s as the first woman pilot to conduct major air flights. Her disappearance for unknown reasons in 1937 while on flight prompted search efforts that failed.
- Southern Great Plains devastated by decades-long Dust Bowl
- In 1932, the Polish Cipher Bureau broke the German Enigma cipher and overcame the ever-growing structural and operating complexities of the evolving Enigma machine with plugboard, the main German cipher device during World War II.
- Getúlio Vargas became the President of Brazil after the 1930 coup d'état.

==== Asia ====
Mohandas Gandhi on the Salt March in 1930

- Major international media attention follows Mohandas Gandhi's peaceful resistance movement against the British colonial rule in India.
- Chinese Communist Party leader Mao Zedong forms the small enclave state called the Chinese Soviet Republic in 1931.
- The Gandhi–Irwin Pact is signed by Mohandas Gandhi and Lord Irwin, Viceroy of India, on March 5, 1931. Gandhi agrees to end the campaign of civil disobedience being carried out by the Indian National Congress (INC) in exchange for Irwin accepting the INC to participate in roundtable talks on British colonial policy in India.
- The Government of India Act of 1935 is enacted by the Governor-General of India, separating British Burma to become a separate British possession and also increasing the political autonomy of the remaining presidencies and provinces of British India.
- Mao Zedong's Chinese communists begin a large retreat from advancing nationalist forces, called the Long March, beginning in October 1934 and ending in October 1936 and resulting in the collapse of the Chinese Soviet Republic.
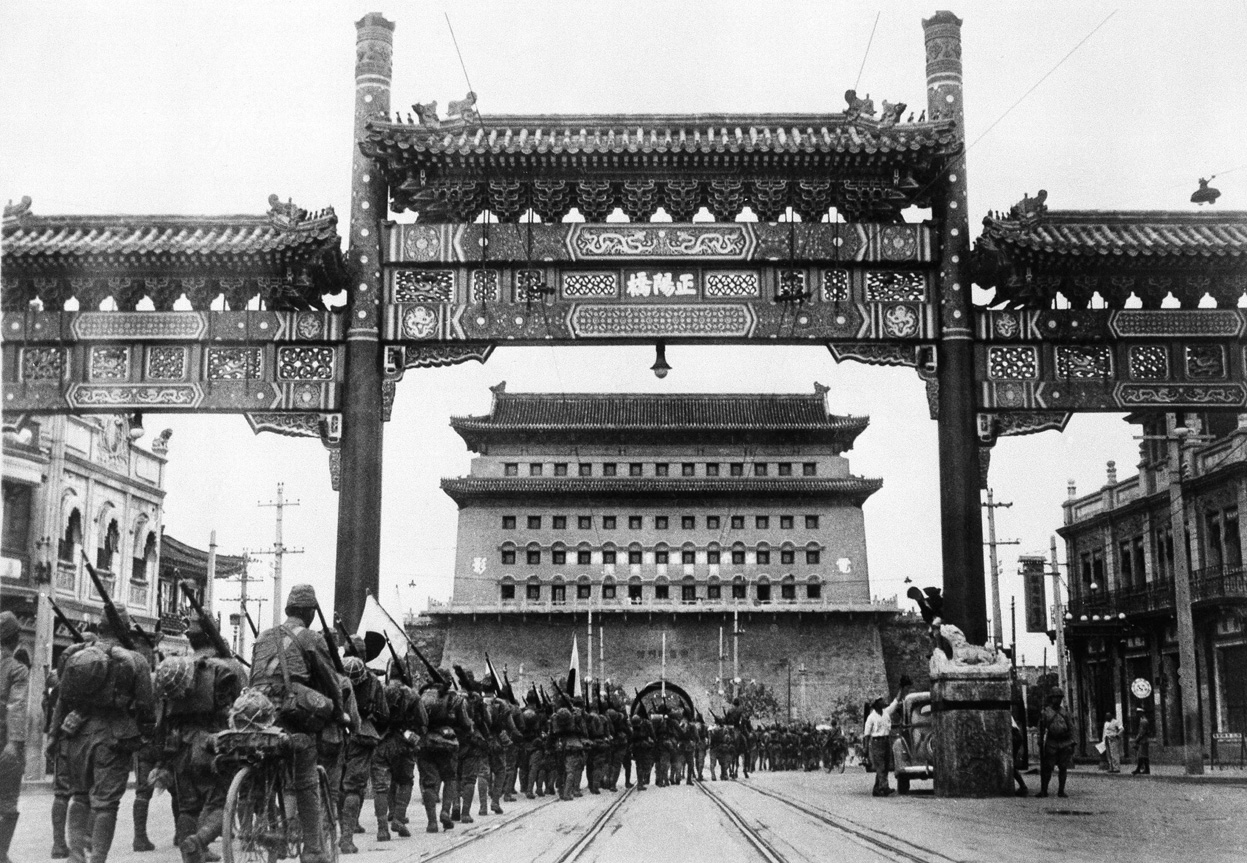
  Japanese march into Zhengyangmen of Beijing after capturing the city in July 1937
- Colonial India's Muslim League leader Muhammed Ali Jinnah delivers his "Day of Deliverance" speech on December 2, 1939, calling upon Muslims to begin to engage in civil disobedience against the British colonial government starting on December 12. Jinnah demands redress and resolution to tensions and violence occurring between Muslims and Hindus in India. Jinnah's actions are not supported by the largely Hindu-dominated Indian National Congress whom he had previously closely allied with. The decision is seen as part of an agenda by Jinnah to support the eventual creation of an independent Muslim state called Pakistan from British Empire.

==== Australia ====
- Australia and New Zealand sign the Statute of Westminster in 1931 which established legislative equality between the self-governing dominions of the British Empire and the United Kingdom, with a few residual exceptions. The Parliament of Australia and Parliament of New Zealand gain full legislative authority over their territories, no longer sharing powers with the Parliament of the United Kingdom.
- The New Guinea Highlands were first visited by Western explorers in the 1930s. The highland valleys were found to be inhabited by over a million people.

== Disasters ==
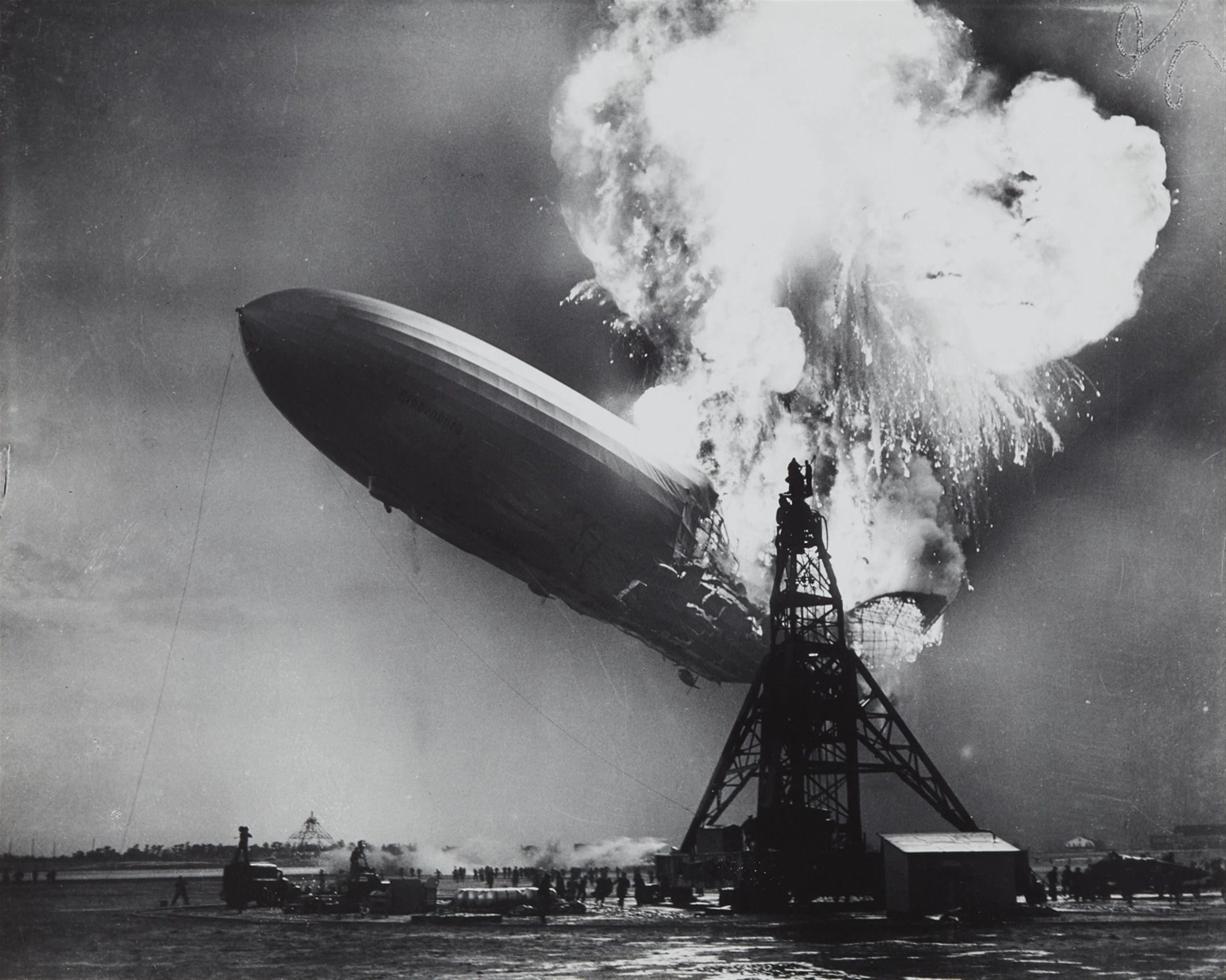
The German dirigible airship Hindenburg exploding in 1937

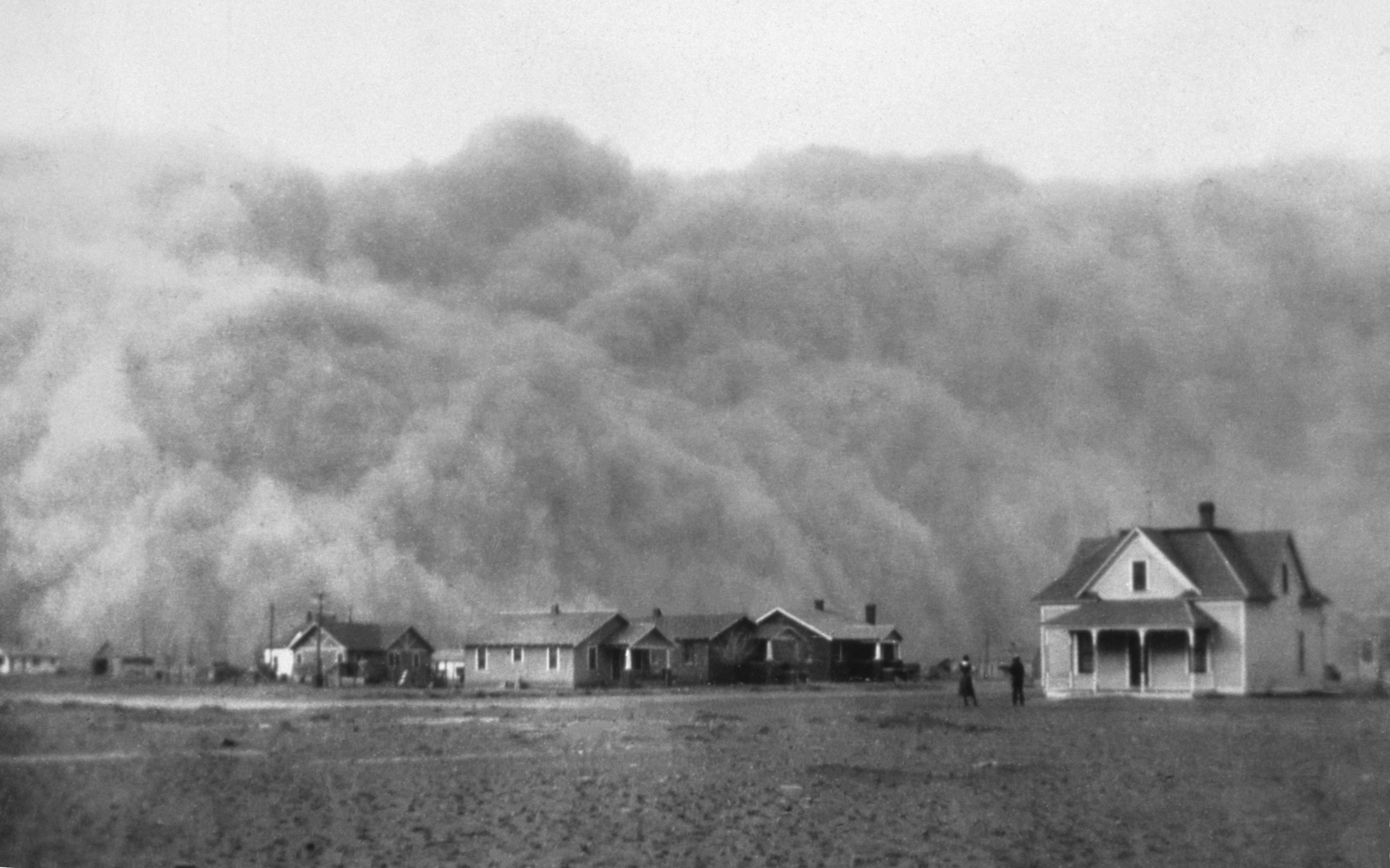
A dust storm approaches Stratford, Texas, in 1935, during the Dust Bowl

- The China floods of 1931 are among the deadliest natural disasters ever recorded.
- The 1935 Labor Day Hurricane makes landfall in the Florida Keys as a Category 5 hurricane and the most intense hurricane to ever make landfall in the Atlantic basin. It caused an estimated $6 million (1935 USD) in damages and killed around 408 people. The hurricane's strong winds and storm surge destroyed nearly all of the structures between Tavernier and Marathon, and the town of Islamorada was obliterated.
- The German dirigible airship Hindenburg explodes in the sky above Lakehurst, New Jersey, United States on May 6, 1937, killing 36 people. The event leads to an investigation of the explosion and the disaster causes major public distrust of the use of hydrogen-inflated airships and seriously damages the reputation of the Zeppelin company.
- The New London School in New London, Texas, is destroyed by an explosion, killing in excess of 300 students and teachers (1937).
- The New England Hurricane of 1938, which became a Category 5 hurricane before making landfall as a Category 3. The hurricane was estimated to have caused property losses of US$306 million ($4.72 billion in 2010), killed between 682 and 800 people, and damaged or destroyed over 57,000 homes, including the home of famed actress Katharine Hepburn, who had been staying in her family's Old Saybrook, Connecticut, beach home when the hurricane struck.
- The Dust Bowl, or "Dirty Thirties", a period of severe dust storms causing major ecological and agricultural damage to American and Canadian prairie lands from 1930 to 1936 (in some areas until 1940). Caused by extreme drought coupled with strong winds and decades of extensive farming without crop rotation, fallow fields, cover crops, or other techniques to prevent erosion, it affected an estimated 100,000,000 acres (400,000 km^{2}) of land (traveling as far east as New York and the Atlantic Ocean), caused mass migration (which was the inspiration for the Pulitzer Prize-winning novel The Grapes of Wrath by John Steinbeck), food shortages, multiple deaths and illness from sand inhalation, and a severe reduction in the going wage rate.
- The 1938 Yellow River flood pours out from Huayuankou, China, inundating 54,000 km^{2} (21,000 sq mi) of land and killing an estimated 500,000 people.

== Assassinations and attempts ==
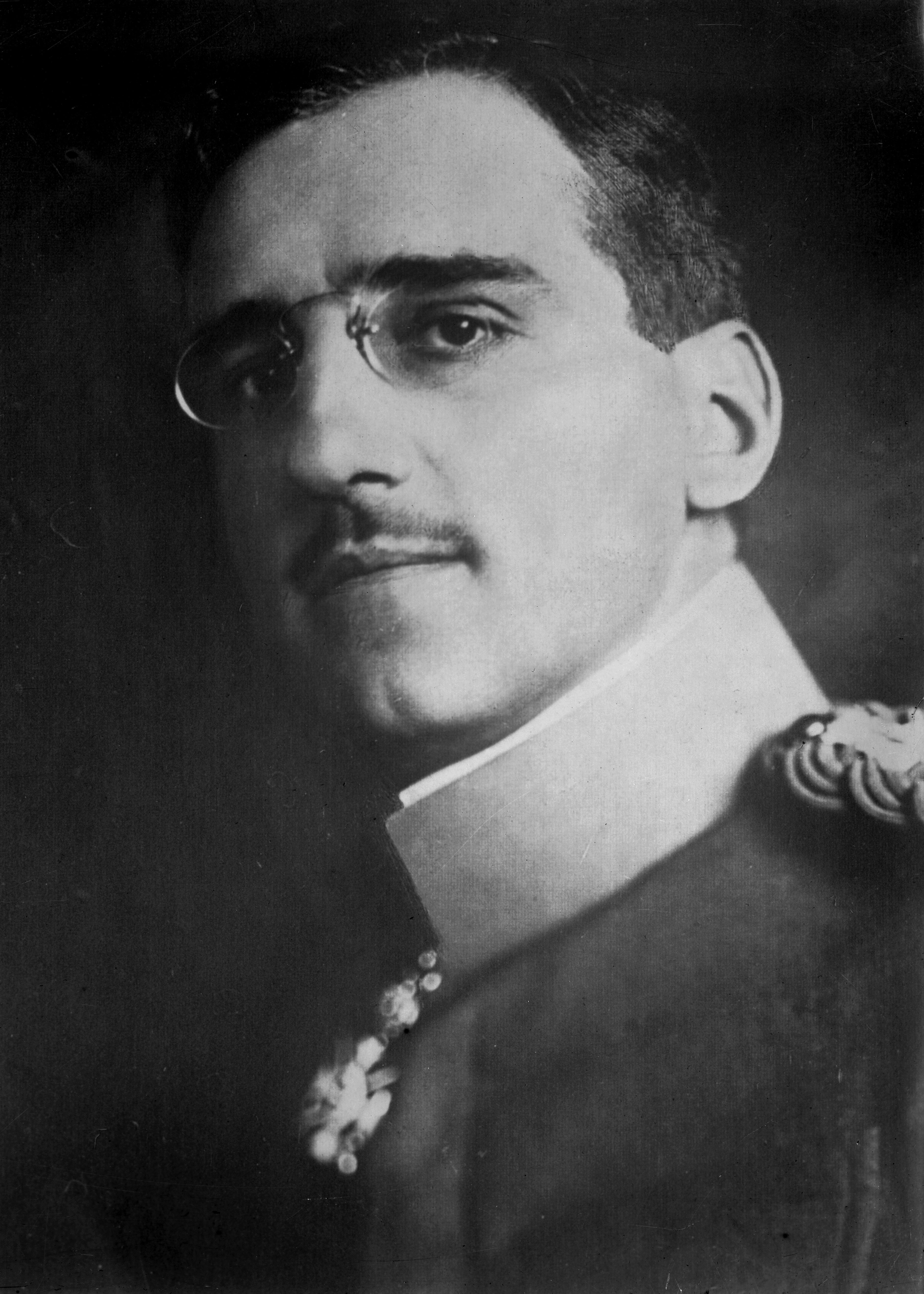
Alexander I of Yugoslavia

Prominent assassinations, targeted killings, and assassination attempts include:

- Japanese prime minister Hamaguchi Osachi is shot and wounded by a right-wing extremist in 1930, dying of his wounds nine months later.
- French president Paul Doumer is assassinated in 1932 by Paul Gorguloff, a mentally unstable Russian émigré.
- Japanese prime minister Inukai Tsuyoshi is assassinated in 1932 by a group of young naval officers and army cadets.
- Chicago mayor Anton Cermak was fatally wounded in 1933 by Giuseppe Zangara, an Italian immigrant who intended to assassinate President-elect Franklin D. Roosevelt. Zangara fired five shots at Roosevelt, but Cermak was the one hit, succumbing to his wounds several weeks later.
- U.S. presidential candidate and former Governor of Louisiana Huey Long is assassinated in 1935 by Carl Weiss.
- Engelbert Dollfuss, Chancellor of Austria and leading figure of Austrofascism, is assassinated in 1934 by Austrian Nazis. Germany and Italy nearly clash over the issue of Austrian independence despite close ideological similarities of the Italian Fascist and Nazi regimes.
- Alexander I of Yugoslavia is assassinated in 1934 during a visit to Marseille, France. His assassin was Vlado Chernozemski, a member of the Internal Macedonian Revolutionary Organization. The IMRO was a political organization that fought for secession of Vardar Macedonia from Yugoslavia.
- Sergei Kirov, an early Bolshevik revolutionary and personal friend to Joseph Stalin, is assassinated in 1934, escalating political repression in the Soviet Union.
- Saitō Makoto and Takahashi Korekiyo, both former prime ministers of Japan, are assassinated by ultranationalistic Army officers during the February 26 incident in 1936.
- Adolf Hitler, dictator of Nazi Germany, survived an assassination attempt in 1939 when a bomb planted by Georg Elser exploded at the Bürgerbräukeller in Munich; he had left the building early, avoiding the blast that killed eight others.

== Economics ==
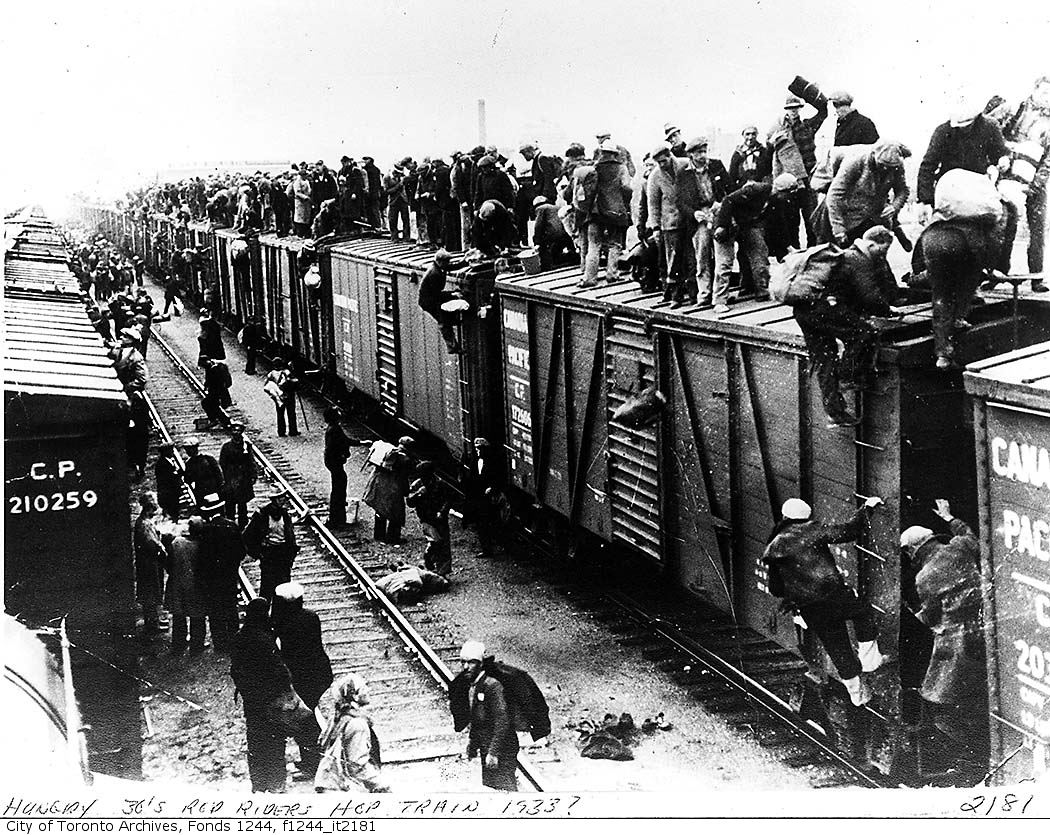
In the United States the significantly high unemployment rate lead many unemployed people to use freight trains in order to seek employment in various cities across the country

- The Great Depression is considered to have begun with the fall of stock prices on September 4, 1929, and then the stock market crash known as Black Tuesday on October 29, 1929, and lasted through much of the 1930s.
- The entire decade is marked by widespread unemployment and poverty, although deflation (i.e. falling prices) was limited to 1930–32 and 1938–39. Prices fell 7.02% in 1930, 10.06% in 1931, 9.79% in 1932, 1.41% in 1938 and 0.71% in 1939.
- Economic interventionist policies increase in popularity as a result of the Great Depression in both authoritarian and democratic countries. In the Western world, Keynesianism replaces classical economic theory.
- In an effort to reduce unemployment, the United States government created work projects such as the Civilian Conservation Corps (CCC) which was a public work relief program that operated from 1933 to 1942 to maintain National Parks and build roads. Other major U.S. government work projects included Hoover Dam which was constructed between 1931 and 1936.
- Rapid industrialization takes place in the Soviet Union.
- Prohibition in the United States ended in 1933. On December 5, 1933, the ratification of the Twenty-first Amendment repealed the Eighteenth Amendment to the United States Constitution.
- Drought conditions in Oklahoma and Texas caused the Dust Bowl which forced tens of thousands of families to abandon their farms and seek employment elsewhere.

== Science and technology ==
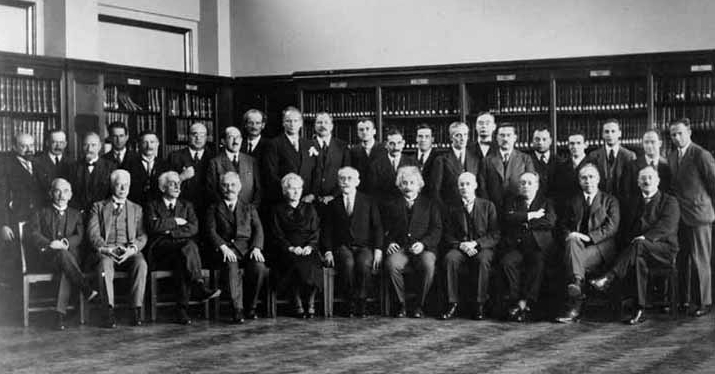
Solvay Conference of 1930, with prominent physicists such as Albert Einstein, Werner Heisenberg, Marie Curie and Enrico Fermi.

=== Technology ===
Many technological advances occurred in the 1930s, including:

- Frank Whittle obtained his first patent for the turbo-jet engine in 1930. He tested his first jet engine on the ground in 1937.
- On March 8, 1930, the first frozen foods of Clarence Birdseye were sold in Springfield, Massachusetts, United States.
- Alan Blumlein invented the stereophonic sound in 1931.
- Nestlé releases the first white chocolate candy as the Milkybar.;
- Ub Iwerks produced the first Color Sound Cartoon in 1930, a Flip the Frog cartoon entitled Fiddlesticks;
- In 1930, Warner Brothers released the first All-Talking All-Color wide-screen movie, Song of the Flame; in 1930 alone, Warner Brothers released ten All-Color All-Talking feature movies in Technicolor and scores of shorts and features with color sequences;
- In 1931 American aviators Clyde Edward Pangborn and Hugh Herndon, Jr., complete the first non-stop flight across the Pacific Ocean, flying their plane, Miss Veedol, from Misawa, Japan, to East Wenatchee, Washington, in 41½ hours.
- Air mail service across the Atlantic Ocean began;
- Radar was invented, known as RDF (Radio Direction Finding), such as in British Patent GB593017 by Robert Watson-Watt in 1938
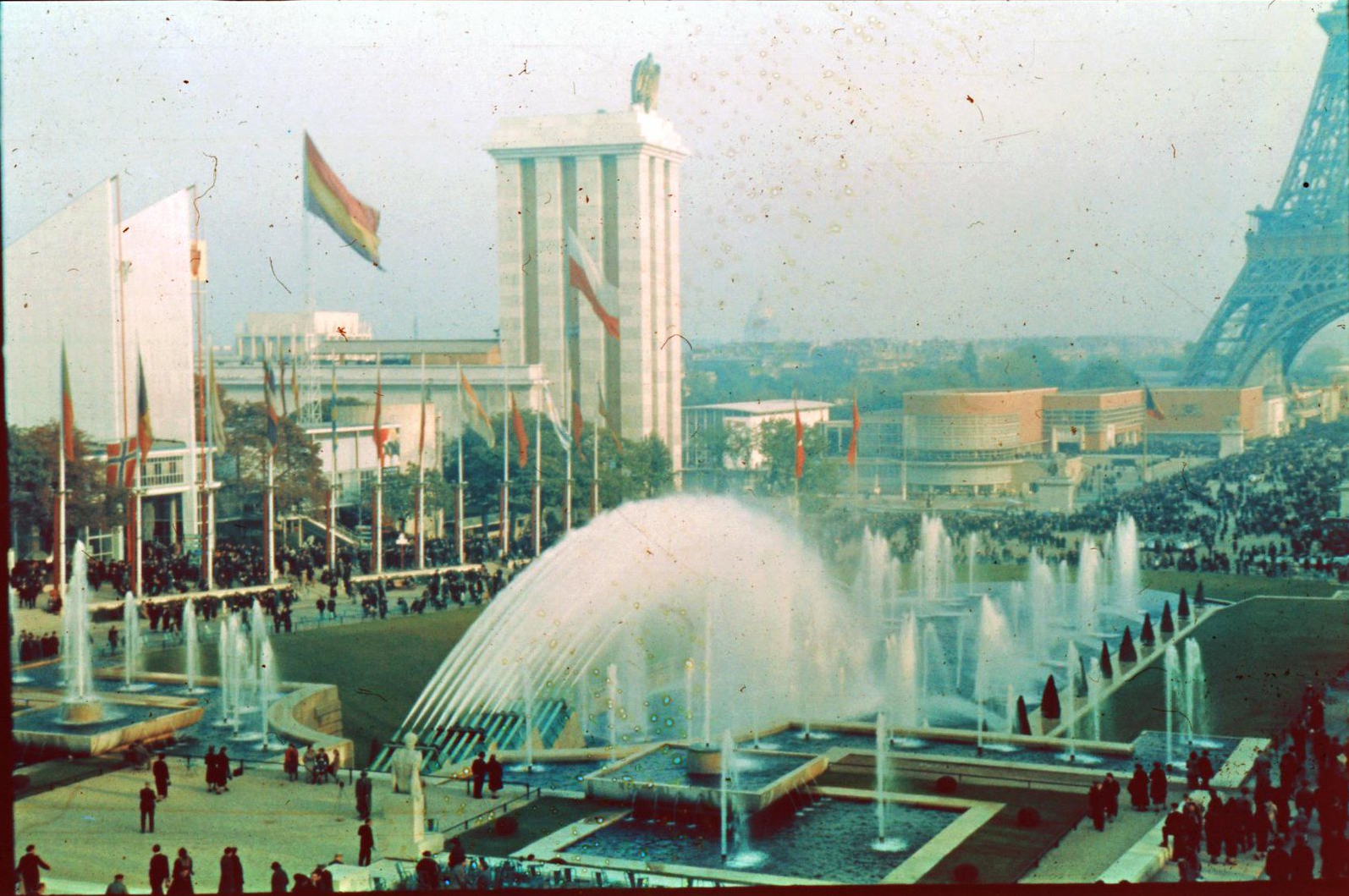
  The Place de Varsovie in Paris during the World Expo in 1937, photographed using newly invented Agfacolor process.
- In 1933, the 3M company marketed Scotch Tape;
- In 1931, RCA Victor introduced the first long-playing phonograph record.
- In 1935, the British London and North Eastern Railway introduced the A4 Pacific, designed by Nigel Gresley. Just three years later, one of these, No. 4468 Mallard, would become the fastest steam locomotive in the world.
- In 1935, Kodachrome is invented, being the first color film made by Eastman Kodak.
- In 1936, The first regular high-definition (then defined as at least 200 lines) television service from the BBC, based at Alexandra Palace in London, officially begins broadcasting.
- The Volkswagen Beetle, one of the best-selling automobiles ever produced, had its roots in Nazi Germany in the late 1930s. Created by Ferdinand Porsche and his chief designer Erwin Komenda. The car would prove to be successful with over 21 million units built and was in production until 2003 with last model built in Mexico. It was superseded by all-new front-wheel-drive New Beetle whose production began in 1997 continued until 2019.
- In 1935, Howard Hughes, flying the H-1, set the landplane airspeed record of 352 mph (566 km/h).
- In 1937, flying the same H-1 Racer fitted with longer wings, the ambitious Hughes sets a new transcontinental airspeed record by flying non-stop from Los Angeles to Newark in 7 hours, 28 minutes, and 25 seconds (beating his own previous record of 9 hours, 27 minutes). His average ground speed during the flight was 322 mph (518 km/h).
- First intercontinental commercial airline flights.
- The chocolate chip cookie is developed in 1938 by Ruth Graves Wakefield.
- The Frying Pan becomes the first electric lap steel guitar ever produced.
- Edwin Armstrong invents wide-band frequency modulation radio in 1933.
- The bass guitar is invented by Paul Tutmarc of Seattle, Washington, in 1936.
- EMI research team, under Isaac Shoenberg, developed the 405-line (Marconi-EMI system), the first fully electronic television system in 1936.
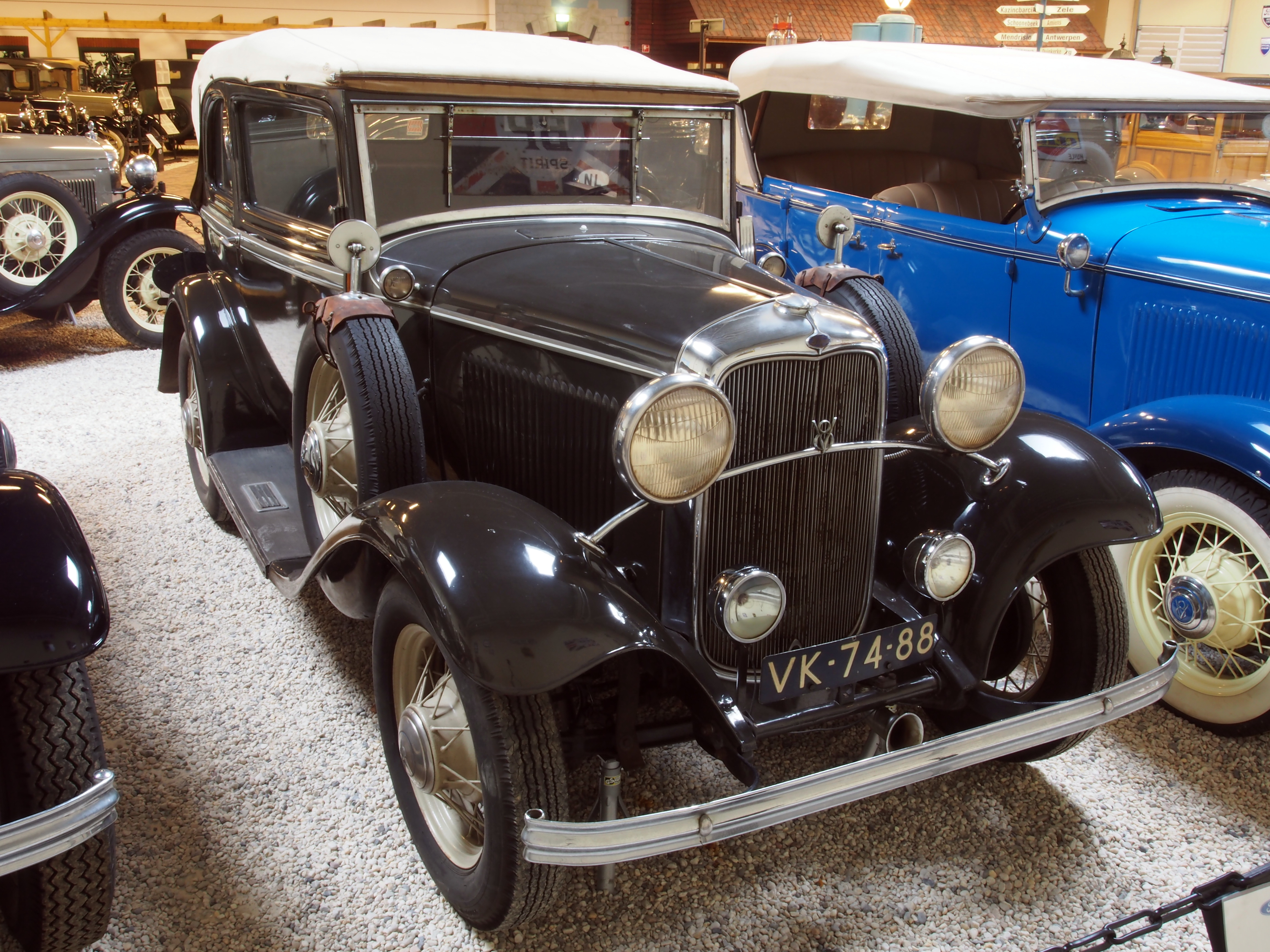
1932 Ford B 400. A typical 1930s american car.

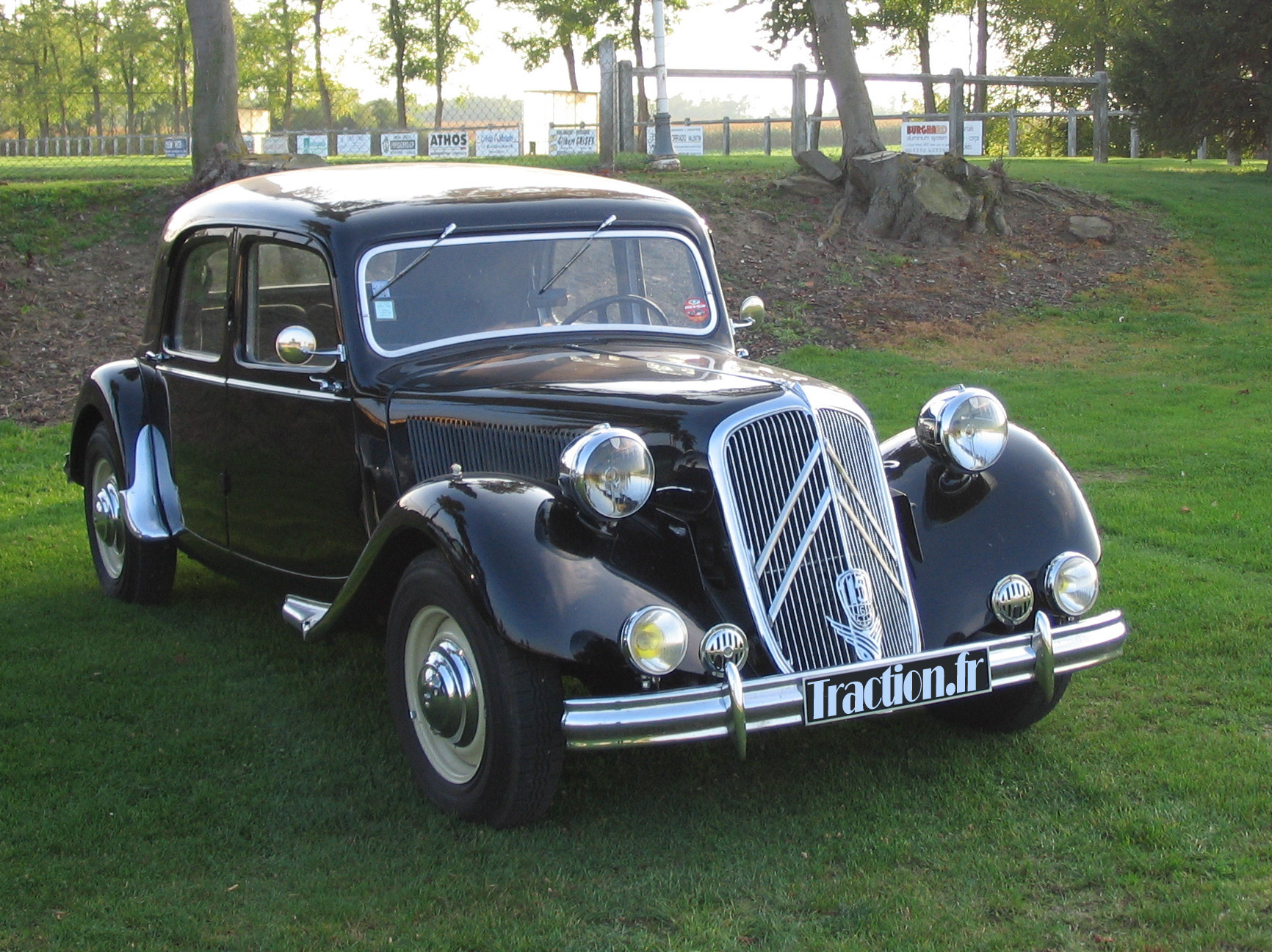
Citroen Traction Avant. A typical 1930s European car.

=== Science ===
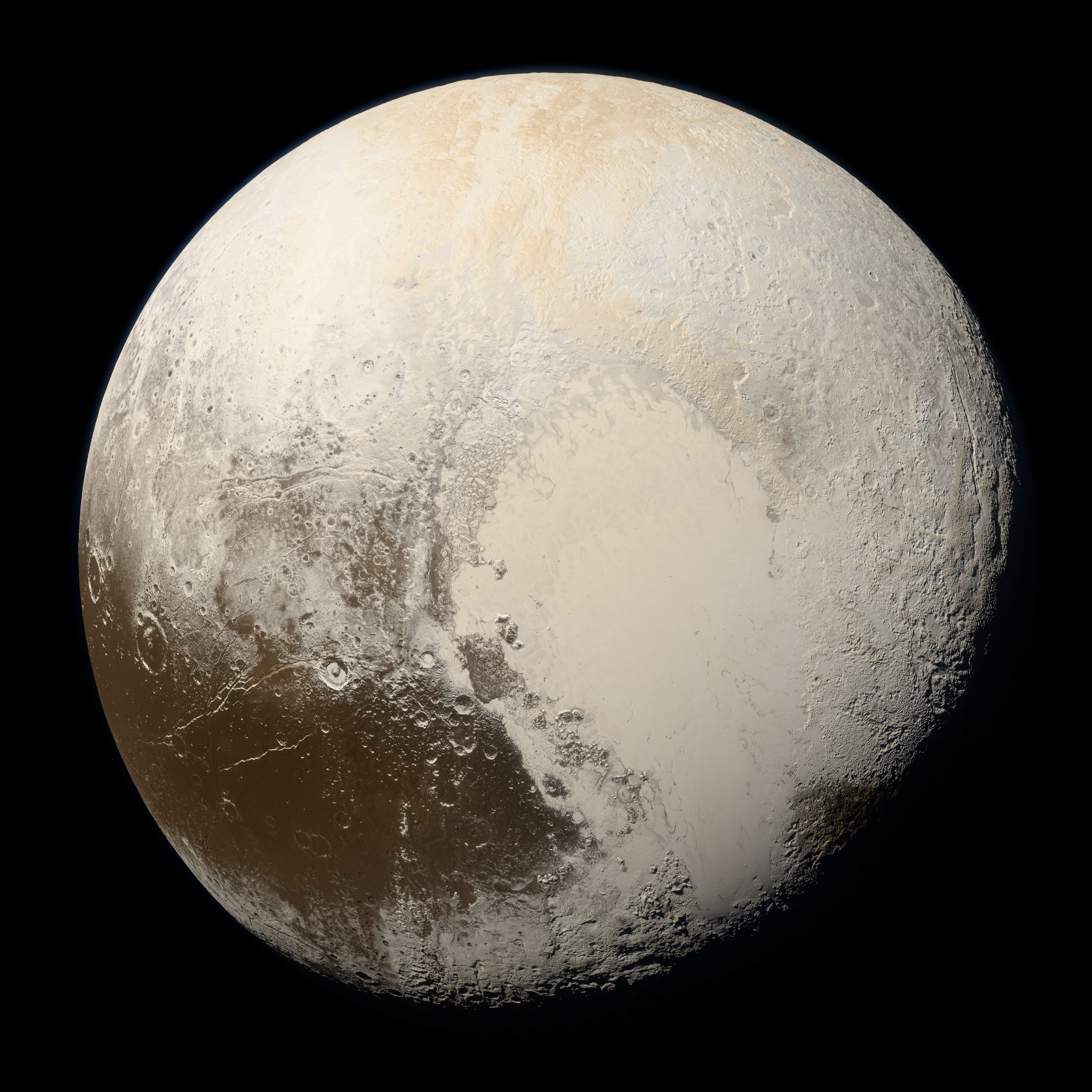
The discovery of the dwarf planet Pluto

- In 1930, Astronomer Clyde Tombaugh discovers Pluto, which goes on to be announced as the ninth planet in the Solar System.
- In 1935, Irene Joliot-Curie and Jean Frederic Joliot are awarded the Nobel Prize in Chemistry for synthesis of new radioactive elements for application in medicine.
- In 1936, Danish seismologist Inge Lehmann was able to conclude that the Earth had a solid inner core and a molten outer core to explain inconsistencies in seismic wave data from earthquakes
- In 1939, Marguerite Perey, a student of Marie Curie, discovered the element francium by purifying samples of lanthanum
- In 1939, Nuclear fission is discovered by Otto Hahn, Lise Meitner and Fritz Strassman. Albert Einstein's equations form the basis for creation of the atomic bomb.

== Popular culture ==
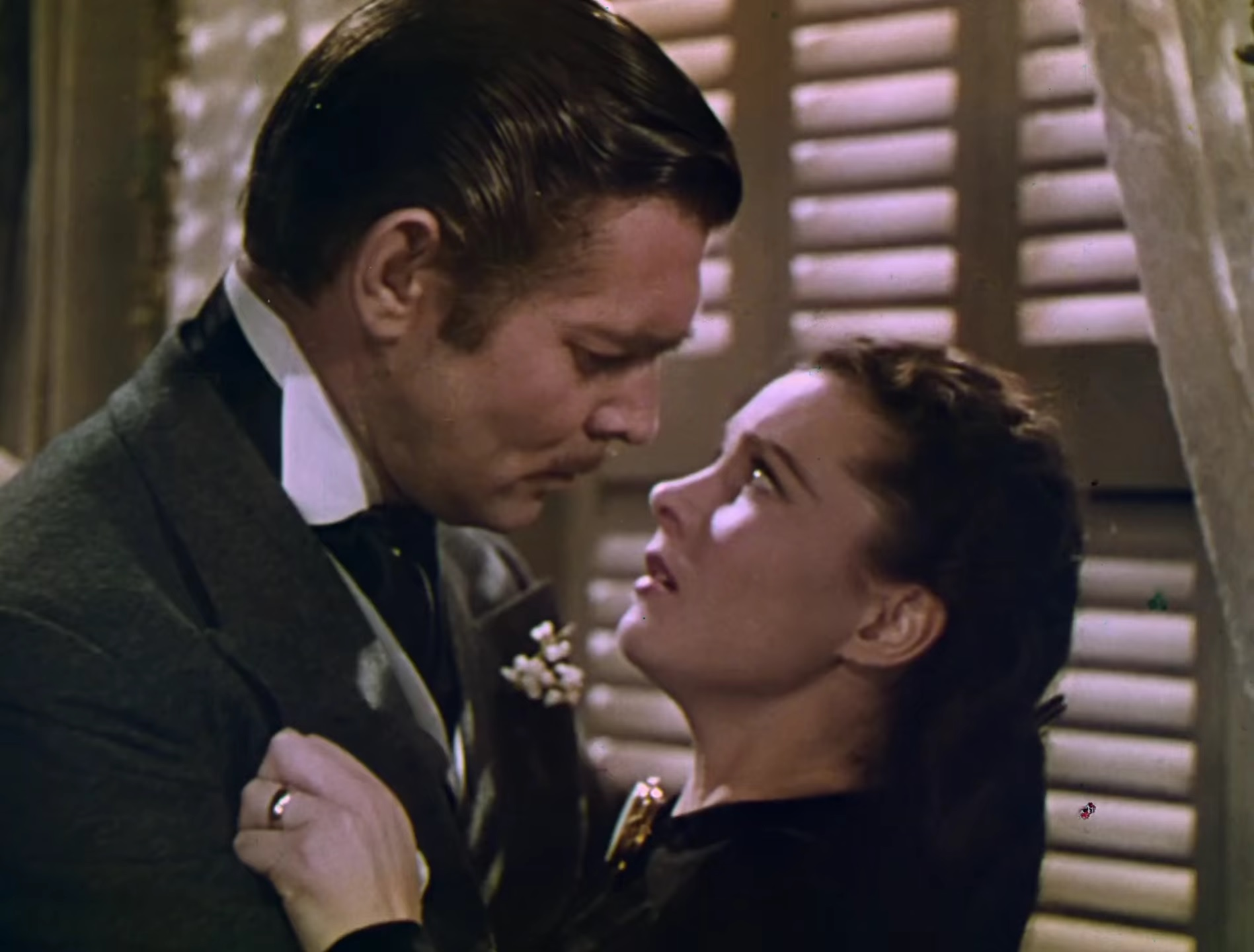
Classic Hollywood flourished during the 1930s, producing iconic films such as Gone with the Wind, The Wizard of Oz, Mr. Smith Goes to Washington, Modern Times, City Lights, and King Kong.

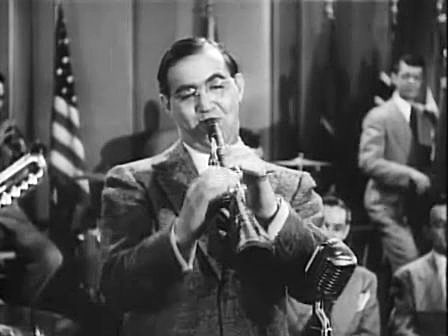
The 1930s saw the rise of swing music and big bands, led by artists such as Benny Goodman, Duke Ellington, Count Basie, and Cab Calloway.

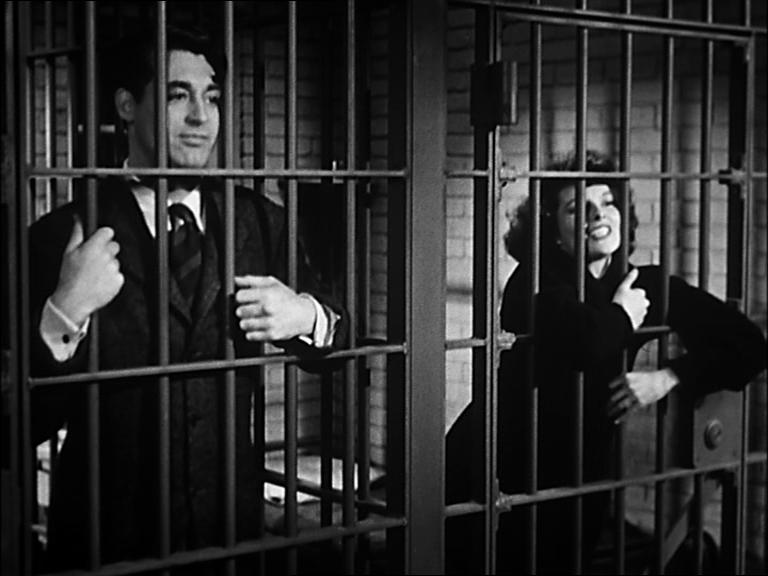
Screwball comedy films were popular during the 1930s, with classics such as Bringing Up Baby, The Awful Truth, and My Man Godfrey.

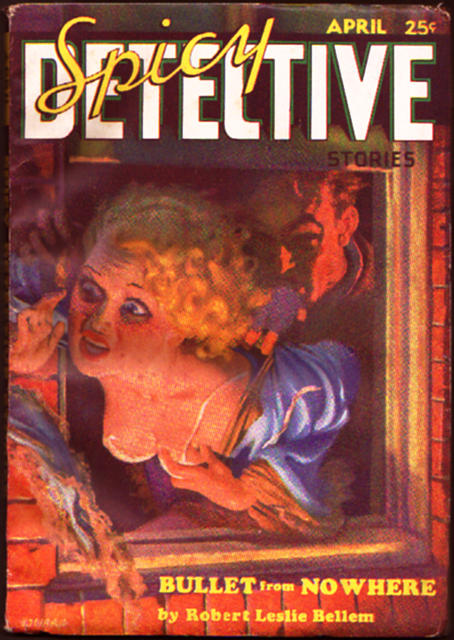
Pulp magazines were popular during the 1930s, featuring inexpensive fiction focused on genres like crime, adventure, science fiction, and horror, and helping launch characters such as The Shadow and Doc Savage.

=== Literature and art ===
- Height of the Art Deco movement in North America and Western Europe.
- Notable poetry include W. H. Auden's Poems.
- Notable literature includes F. Scott Fitzgerald's Tender Is the Night (1934), T. H. White's The Sword in the Stone (1938), J. R. R. Tolkien's The Hobbit (1937), Aldous Huxley's Brave New World (1932), John Steinbeck's Grapes of Wrath (1939) and Of Mice and Men (1937), Ernest Hemingway's To Have and Have Not (1937), John Dos Passos's U.S.A. trilogy, William Faulkner's As I Lay Dying (1930) and Absalom, Absalom! (1936), John O'Hara's Appointment in Samarra (1934) and Butterfield 8 (1935), and Margaret Mitchell's Gone with the Wind (1936), which was later famously adapted into a film in 1939.
- Notable "hardboiled" crime fiction includes Raymond Chandler's The Big Sleep, Dashiell Hammett's The Maltese Falcon, James M. Cain's The Postman Always Rings Twice (1934).
- Notable plays include Thornton Wilder's Our Town (1938).
- Near the end of the decade, two of the world's most iconic superheroes and recognizable fictional characters were introduced in comic books; Superman first appeared in 1938, and Batman in 1939.
- The 1930 also saw the widespread popularity of the pulp magazine. Printed on cheap pulp paper, these magazines provided affordable entertainment to the masses and quickly became one of the most popular forms of media during the decade. Many prominent writers of the 20th century would get their start writing for pulps, including F. Scott Fitzgerald, Dashiell Hammett, Isaac Asimov and H. P. Lovecraft. Pulp fiction magazines would last in popularity until the advent of television in the 1950s.
- Popular comic strips which began in the 1930s include Captain Easy by Roy Crane, Alley Oop by V. T. Hamlin, Prince Valiant by Hal Foster, and Flash Gordon by Alex Raymond.
- The beginning of the Golden Age of Science Fiction in the late-1930s, spurred on by writer and editor John C. Campbell, launching the careers of such writers as Robert Heinlein, Isaac Asimov and A. E. van Vogt.
- David Alfaro Siqueiros paints the controversial mural América Tropical (full name: América Tropical: Oprimida y Destrozada por los Imperialismos, or Tropical America: Oppressed and Destroyed by Imperialism) (1932) at Olvera Street in Los Angeles, California.
- Jorge Luis Borges publishes A Universal History of Infamy in 1935. Angel Flores, the creator of the term "magical realism", claims this book originated the movement.
- Roberto Arlt publishes The Flamethrowers, the second part of his novel The Seven Madmen

=== Best-selling books ===
The best-selling books of every year in the United States were as follows:

- 1930: Cimarron by Edna Ferber
- 1931: The Good Earth by Pearl S. Buck
- 1932: The Good Earth by Pearl S. Buck
- 1933: Anthony Adverse by Hervey Allen
- 1934: Anthony Adverse by Hervey Allen
- 1935: Green Light by Lloyd C. Douglas
- 1936: Gone with the Wind by Margaret Mitchell
- 1937: Gone with the Wind by Margaret Mitchell
- 1938: The Yearling by Marjorie Kinnan Rawlings
- 1939: The Grapes of Wrath by John Steinbeck

=== Film ===
- Charlie Chaplin's groundbreaking classic, City Lights, was released in 1931.
- Charlie Chaplin's last film featuring his signature character, "The Tramp", was subsequently released in 1936.
- Walt Disney's original animated feature-length film Snow White and the Seven Dwarfs was released in 1937.
- The Little Princess was released in 1939.
- The Wizard of Oz was released in 1939.
- In the art of filmmaking, the Golden Age of Hollywood enters a new era after the advent of talking pictures ("talkies") in 1927 and full-color films in 1930: more than 50 classic films were made in the 1930s; most notable were Gone with the Wind and The Wizard of Oz.
- In 1930s, animated cartoon short films including Donald Duck, Goofy, Pluto, Betty Boop, Popeye, Looney Tunes and Merrie Melodies.
- The new soundtrack and photographic technologies prompted many films to be made or re-made, such as the 1934 version of Cleopatra, using lush art deco sets, which won an Academy Award (see films 1930–1939 in Academy Award for Best Cinematography).
- Universal Pictures begins producing its distinctive series of horror films, which came to be known as the Universal Monsters, featuring what would become iconic representations of literary and mythological monsters. The horror films (or monster movies) included many cult classics, such as Dracula, Frankenstein, The Mummy, Dr. Jekyll and Mr. Hyde, King Kong, The Hunchback of Notre Dame, and other films about wax museums, vampires, and zombies, leading to the 1941 film The Wolf Man. These films led to the stardom of stars such as Bela Lugosi, Lon Chaney Jr, and Boris Karloff.
- Recurring series and serials included The Three Stooges, Laurel and Hardy, the Marx Brothers, Tarzan, Charlie Chan and Our Gang.
- In 1930, Howard Hughes produces Hell's Angels, the first movie blockbuster to be produced outside of a professional studio, independently, and at the time the most expensive movie ever made, costing roughly 4 million dollars and taking four years to make.
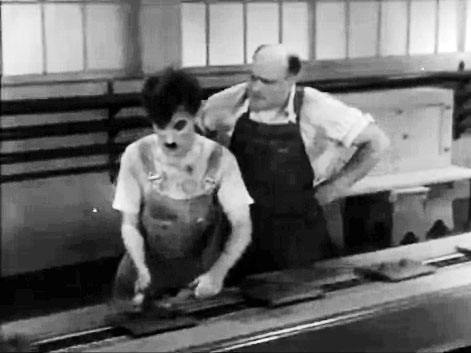
Charlie Chaplin in a scene from the film Modern Times (1936)

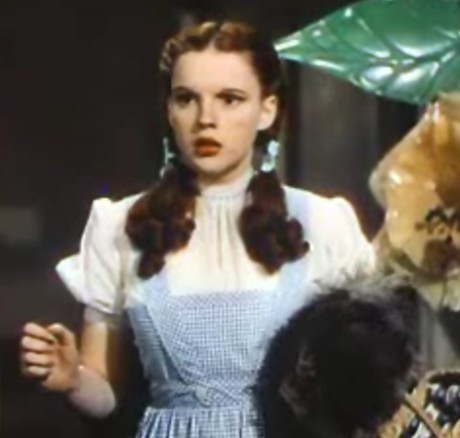
Judy Garland as Dorothy Gale in The Wizard of Oz (1939)

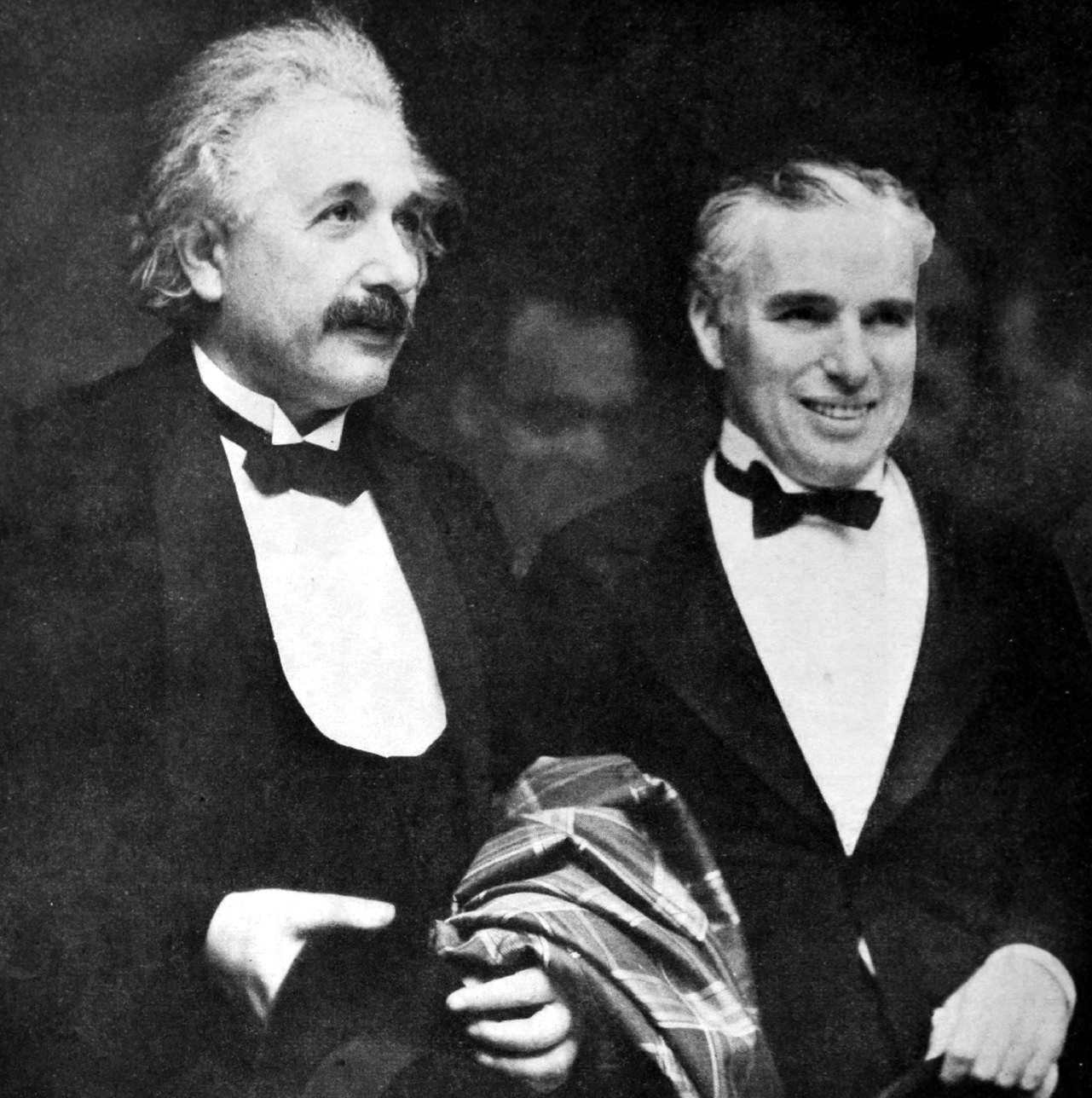
Albert Einstein with Charlie Chaplin during the premiere of "City Lights" (1931)

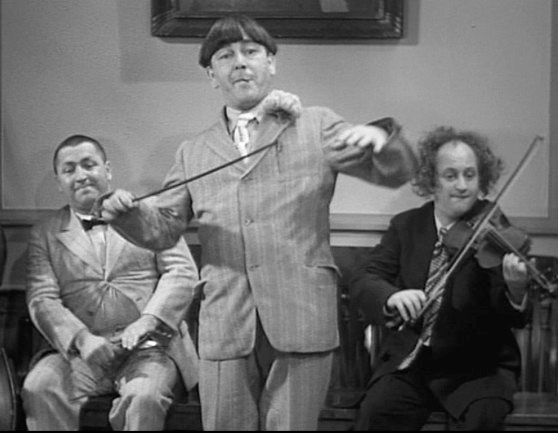
The Three Stooges produced multiple short comedy films with Columbia Pictures during the decade, making them icons.

==== Highest-grossing films ====
Year	Title	Worldwide gross	Budget	Reference(s)
1930	All Quiet on the Western Front	$3,000,000^{R}	$1,250,000	(Note: "Biggest Money Pictures". Variety. June 21, 1932. p. 1 – via Archive.org. Cited in "Biggest Money Pictures". Cinemaweb. Archived from the original on July 8, 2011.) (Note: Balio, Tino (1996). Grand Design: Hollywood as a Modern Business Enterprise, 1930–1939. Vol. 5 of History of the American Cinema. University of California Press. ISBN 978-0-520-20334-1.: Cavalcade: p. 182. "Produced by Winfield Sheehan at a cost of $1.25 million, Cavalcade won Academy Awards for best picture, director, art direction and grossed close to $4 million during its first release, much of which came from Great Britain and the Empire."; Whoopee: p. 212. "Produced by Sam Goldwyn at a cost of $1 million, the picture was an adaptation of a smash musical comedy built around Eddie Cantor...A personality-centered musical, Whoopee! made little attempt to integrate the comedy routines, songs, and story. Nonetheless, Cantor's feature-film debut grossed over $2.6 million worldwide and started a popular series that included Palmy Days (1931), The Kid from Spain (1932), and Roman Scandals (1933).") (Note: Hell's Angels: Balio, Tino (1976). United Artists: The Company Built by the Stars. University of Wisconsin Press. p. 110. "Hughes did not have the "Midas touch" the trade press so often attributed to him. Variety, for example, reported that Hell's Angels cost $3.2 million to make, and by July, 1931, eight months after its release, the production cost had nearly been paid off. Keats claimed the picture cost $4 million to make and that it earned twice that much within twenty years. The production cost estimate is probably correct. Hughes worked on the picture for over two years, shooting it first as a silent and then as a talkie. Lewis Milestone said that in between Hughes experimented with shooting it in color as well. But Variety's earnings report must be the fabrication of a delirious publicity agent, and Keats' the working of a myth maker. During the seven years it was in United Artists distribution, Hell's Angels grossed $1.6 million in the domestic market, of which Hughes' share was $1.2 million. Whatever the foreign gross was, it seems unlikely that it was great enough to earn a profit for the picture.")
1931	Frankenstein	$12,000,000^{R} ($1,400,000)^{R}	$250,000	(Note: Block & Wilson 2010, p. 163. "It drew $1.4 million in worldwide rentals in its first run versus $1.2 million for Dracula, which had opened in February 1931.")
1931	City Lights	$5,000,000^{R}	$1,607,351	
1932	The Sign of the Cross	$2,738,993^{R}	$694,065	(Note: Birchard, Robert S. (2009). Cecil B. DeMille's Hollywood. University Press of Kentucky. ISBN 978-0-8131-3829-9.: ch. 45. The Ten Commandments (1923). "Cost: $1,475,836.93; Gross: $4,169,798.38"; ch. 56. The Sign of the Cross. "Cost: $694,064.67; Gross: $2,738,993.35 (to 1937)"; ch. 68. Samson and Delilah. "Cost: $3,097,563.05"; ch. 69. The Greatest Show on Earth. "Cost: $3,873,946.50; Gross receipts: $15,797,396.36 (to December 29, 1962)"; ch. 70. The Ten Commandments (1956). "Cost: $13,272,381.87; Gross receipts: $90,066,230.00 (to June 23, 1979)") (Note: Sedgwick, John (2000). Popular Filmgoing In 1930s Britain: A Choice of Pleasures. University of Exeter Press. pp. 146–148. ISBN 978-0-85989-660-3. "Sources: Eddie Mannix Ledger, made available to the author by Mark Glancy...": Grand Hotel: Production Cost $000s: 700; Distribution Cost $000s: 947; U.S. box-office $000s: 1,235; Foreign box-office $000s: 1,359; Total box-office $000s: 2,594; Profit $000s: 947.; The Merry Widow: Production Cost $000s: 1,605; Distribution Cost $000s: 1,116; U.S. box-office $000s: 861; Foreign box-office $000s: 1,747; Total box-office $000s: 2,608; Profit $000s: -113.; Viva Villa: Production Cost $000s: 1,022; Distribution Cost $000s: 766; U.S. box-office $000s: 941; Foreign box-office $000s: 934; Total box-office $000s: 1,875; Profit $000s: 87.; Mutiny on the Bounty: Production Cost $000s: 1,905; Distribution Cost $000s: 1,646; U.S. box-office $000s: 2,250; Foreign box-office $000s: 2,210; Total box-office $000s: 4,460; Profit $000s: 909.; San Francisco: Production Cost $000s: 1,300; Distribution Cost $000s: 1,736; U.S. box-office $000s: 2,868; Foreign box-office $000s: 2,405; Total box-office $000s: 5,273; Profit $000s: 2,237.) (Note: Shanghai Express: Block & Wilson 2010, p. 165. "Shanghai Express was Dietrich's biggest hit in America, bringing in $1.5 million in worldwide rentals.")
1933	King Kong	$5,347,000^{R} ($1,856,000)^{R}	$672,255.75	(Note: King Kong: Jewel, Richard (1994). "RKO Film Grosses: 1931–1951". Historical Journal of Film, Radio and Television. 14 (1): 39. "1933 release: $1,856,000; 1938 release: $306,000; 1944 release: $685,000"; "King Kong (1933) – Notes". Turner Classic Movies. "1952 release: $2,500,000; budget: $672,254.75")
1933	I'm No Angel	$3,250,000+^{R}	$200,000	(Note: Finler 2003, p. 188. "The studio released its most profitable pictures of the decade in 1933, She Done Him Wrong and I'm No Angel, written by and starring Mae West. Produced at a rock-bottom cost of $200,000 each, they undoubtedly helped Paramount through the worst patch in its history...")
1933	Cavalcade	$3,000,000–4,000,000^{R}	$1,116,000	(Note: Solomon, Aubrey (2011). The Fox Film Corporation, 1915–1935: A History and Filmography. McFarland & Company. ISBN 978-0-7864-6286-5.: Way Down East: p. 52. "D.W. Griffith's Way Down East (1920) was projected to return rentals of $4,000,000 on an $800,000 negative. This figure was based on the amounts earned from its roadshow run, coupled with its playoff in the rest of the country's theaters. Griffith had originally placed the potential film rental at $3,000,000 but, because of the success of the various roadshows that were running the $4,000,000 total was expected. The film showed a profit of $615,736 after just 23 weeks of release on a gross of $2,179,613."; What Price Glory?: p. 112. "What Price Glory hit the jackpot with massive world rentals of $2,429,000, the highest figure in the history of the company. Since it was also the most expensive production of the year at $817,000 the profit was still a healthy $796,000..."; Cavalcade: p. 170. "The actual cost of Cavalcade was $1,116,000 and it was most definitely not guaranteed a success. In fact, if its foreign grosses followed the usual 40 percent of domestic returns, the film would have lost money. In a turnaround, the foreign gross was almost double the $1,000,000 domestic take to reach total world rentals of $3,000,000 and Fox's largest profit of the year at $664,000."; State Fair: p. 170. "State Fair did turn out to be a substantial hit with the help of Janet Gaynor boosting Will Rogers back to the level of money-making star. Its prestige engagements helped raked in a total $1,208,000 in domestic rentals. Surprisingly, in foreign countries unfamiliar with state fairs, it still earned a respectable $429,000. With its total rentals, the film ended up showing a $398,000 profit.")
1933	She Done Him Wrong	$3,000,000+^{R}	$274,076	(Note: Block & Wilson 2010, p. 135. "Total production cost: $274,076 (Unadjusted $s).")
1934	The Merry Widow	$2,608,000^{R}	$1,605,000	(Note: Turk, Edward Baron (2000) [1st. pub. 1998]. Hollywood Diva: A Biography of Jeanette MacDonald. University of California Press. ISBN 978-0-520-22253-3.: The Merry Widow: p. 361 Cost: $1,605,000. Earnings: domestic $861,000; foreign $1,747,000; total $2,608,000. Loss: $113,000.; San Francisco: p. 364 Cost: $1,300,000. Earnings: domestic $2,868,000; foreign $2,405,000; total $5,273,000. Profit: $2,237,000. [Reissues in 1938–39 and 1948–49 brought profits of $124,000 and $647,000 respectively.])
1934	It Happened One Night	$2,500,000^{R} ^{ON}	$325,000	
1935	Mutiny on the Bounty	$4,460,000^{R}	$1,905,000	
1936	San Francisco	$6,044,000+^{R} ($5,273,000)^{R}	$1,300,000	
1937	Snow White and the Seven Dwarfs	$418,000,000+^{S7} ($8,500,000)^{R}	$1,488,423	(Note: Snow White and the Seven Dwarfs: Monaco, Paul (2010). A History of American Movies: A Film-By-Film Look at the Art, Craft, and Business of Cinema. Scarecrow Press. p. 54. ISBN 978-0-8108-7434-3. "Considered a highly risky gamble when the movie was in production in the mid-1930s, by the fiftieth anniversary of its 1937 premiere Snow White's earnings exceeded $330 million."; Wilhelm, Henry Gilmer; Brower, Carol (1993). The Permanence and Care of Color Photographs: Traditional and Digital Color Prints, Color Negatives, Slides, and Motion Pictures. Preservation Pub. p. 359. ISBN 978-0-911515-00-8. "In only 2 months after the 1987 re-release, the film grossed another $45 million—giving it a total gross to date of about $375 million!"; "Snow White and the Seven Dwarfs (1987 Re-issue)". Boxoffice. "North American box-office: $46,594,719"; "Snow White and the Seven Dwarfs (1993 Re-issue)". Boxoffice. "North American box-office: $41,634,791") (Note: Snow White and the Seven Dwarfs and Pinocchio: Block & Wilson 2010; p. 207. "When the budget rose from $250,000 to $1,488,423 he even mortgaged his own home and automobile. Disney had bet more than his company on the success of Snow White." p. 237. "By the end of 1938, it had grossed more than $8 million in worldwide rentals and was ranked at the time as the second-highest-grossing film after the 1925 epic Ben-Hur". p. 255. "On its initial release Pinocchio brought in only $1.6 million in domestic rentals (compared with Snow White's $4.2 million) and $1.9 million in foreign rentals (compared with Snow White's $4.3 million).")
1938	You Can't Take It With You	$5,000,000^{R}	$1,200,000	(Note: 1938: You Can't Take It With You:"You Can't Take It With You Premieres". Focus Features. Archived from the original on September 13, 2012. "You Can't Take It With You received excellent reviews, won Best Picture and Best Director at the 1938 Academy Awards, and earned over $5 million worldwide."; Boys Town: Block, Alex Ben (2010), Boys Town, p. 215, "The film quickly became a smash nationwide, making a profit of over $2 million on worldwide rentals of $4 million." In: Block & Wilson 2010.; The Adventures of Robin Hood: Glancy, H. Mark (1995). "Warner Bros Film Grosses, 1921–51: the William Schaefer ledger". Historical Journal of Film, Radio and Television. 1 (15): 55–60. doi:10.1080/01439689500260031. "$3.981 million."; Alexander's Ragtime Band: Block, Hayley Taylor (2010), Alexander's Ragtime Band, p. 213, "Once the confusion cleared, however, the film blossomed into a commercial success, with a profit of $978,000 on worldwide rentals of $3.6 million." In: Block & Wilson 2010.)
1939	Gone with the Wind	$390,525,192–402,352,579 ($32,000,000)^{R} ^{GW}	$3,900,000–4,250,000	(Note: Gone with the Wind at Box Office Mojo) (Note: Hall & Neale 2010, p. 283 ."The final negative cost of Gone with the Wind (GWTW) has been variously reported between $3.9 million and $4.25 million.")

=== Radio ===
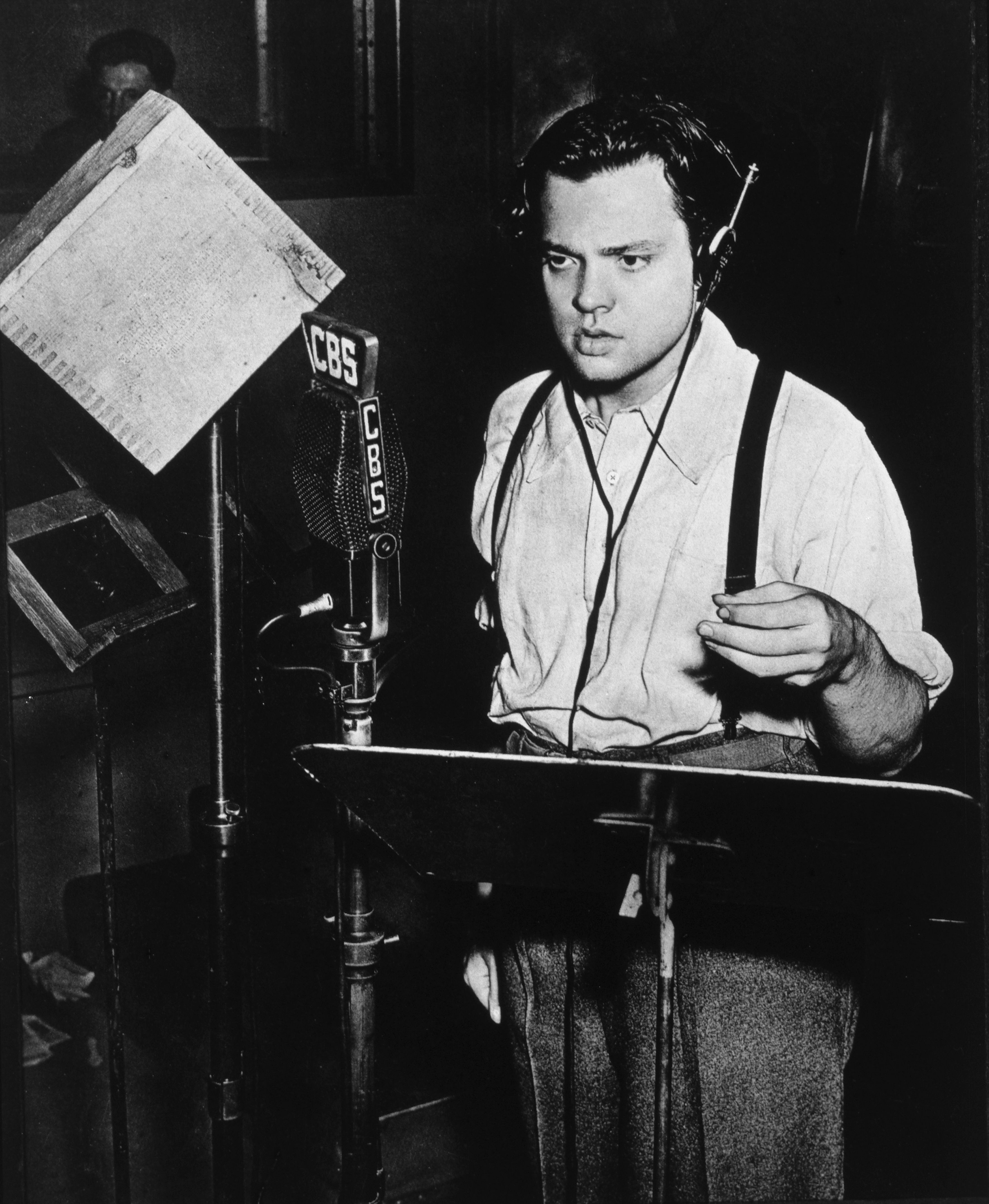
On October 30, 1938 Orson Welles' radio adaptation of The War of the Worlds is broadcast, causing panic in various parts of the United States

- Radio becomes dominant mass media in industrial nations, serving as a way for citizens to listen to music and get news- providing rapid reporting on current events.
- October 30, 1938: Orson Welles' radio adaptation of The War of the Worlds is broadcast, causing panic in various parts of the United States.

=== Music ===
- "Swing" music starts becoming popular from 1933, the dawn of the Swing era. It gradually replaces the sweet form of Jazz that had been popular for the first half of the decade.
- Crooning is a smooth, intimate singing style that developed in the United States with the advent of microphones and radio, allowing singers to deliver soft emotional performances rather than projecting loudly. It became particularly popular in the 1930s, and performers such as Bing Crosby and Rudy Vallée are among the most representative early crooners, exemplifying this warm, close‑to‑the‑listener vocal approach.
- "Delta Blues" music, the first recorded in the late 1920s, was expanded by Robert Johnson and Skip James, two of the most important and influential acts of "Blues" genre.
- Django Reinhardt and Stéphane Grappelli led the development of Gypsy jazz.
- Sergei Rachmaninoff composed Rhapsody on a Theme of Paganini in 1934.
- Charlie Christian becomes the first electric guitarist to be in a multiracial band with Benny Goodman and Lionel Hampton in 1939.
- Tango reaches its highest popularity worldwide and Carlos Gardel records several of the most famous tangos, such as "Por Una Cabeza"

The most popular music of each year was as follows:

- 1930: "Body and Soul" (music by Johnny Green, lyrics by Edward Heyman, Robert Sour and Frank Eyton)
- 1931: "Life Is Just a Bowl of Cherries" (music by Ray Henderson, lyrics by Lew Brown)
- 1932: "Night and Day" (Cole Porter)
- 1933: "It's Only a Paper Moon" (music by Harold Arlen, lyrics by Yip Harburg and Billy Rose)
- 1934: "Blue Moon" (written by Richard Rodgers and Lorenz Hart)
- 1935: "Begin the Beguine" (Cole Porter)
- 1936: "I'm an Old Cowhand" (written by Johnny Mercer, sung by Bing Crosby)
- 1937: "A Foggy Day" (composed by George Gershwin, with lyrics by Ira Gershwin)
- 1938: "Chiquita Banana"
- 1939: "All the Things You Are" (composed by Jerome Kern with lyrics written by Oscar Hammerstein II)

=== Fashion ===
The fashion of the 1930s was shaped by two major world events that bookended the decade: the Wall Street Crash of 1929 and the onset of World War II in 1939. Despite the severe economic hardship of the Great Depression, the era was paradoxically characterized by glamorous, elegant clothing: The Museum at FIT described the decade's fashions as a "startling paradox", noting that elegant and progressive qualities emerged "during one of the most tumultuous periods of modern Western history." In womenswear, the decade marked a decisive departure from the boxy, androgynous silhouette of the previous decade, with hemlines falling and waistlines returning to their natural position, creating a sleek, feminine silhouette that emphasized the curves of the body.

The dominant technical innovation of the era was the bias cut, championed by French couturière Madeleine Vionnet, which involved cutting fabric at a 45-degree angle against the weave, allowing it to drape smoothly over the body's natural shape—a technique that defined the decade's signature evening look of sleek, low-backed satin gowns. The early years of the decade were also shaped by a neoclassical style, with white and ivory columnar evening dresses featuring Greek-inspired draping, while surrealism exerted a parallel influence, most fully embodied in the provocative designs of Elsa Schiaparelli, who collaborated with Salvador Dalí on pieces such as a silk dress printed with a lobster motif and hats shaped like shoes and lamb cutlets.

The Hollywood film industry emerged during the decade as a major force in shaping and disseminating fashion trends, challenging the hitherto dominant influence of Parisian haute couture; as couturier Lucien Lelong remarked in 1935, "We, the couturiers, can no longer live without the cinema any more than the cinema can live without us." Costume designers such as Adrian, Travis Banton and Edith Head dressed Hollywood stars whose styles were widely imitated; a defining example was the organdie gown Adrian designed for Joan Crawford in Letty Lynton (1932), which generated thousands of copies at all price ranges. Alongside Hollywood stars such as Jean Harlow, Greta Garbo, Marlene Dietrich and Katharine Hepburn, the key fashion trendsetters of the decade included the Duke and Duchess of Windsor—Edward VIII and Wallis Simpson—and socialites such as Daisy Fellowes and Mona von Bismarck.

The decade also brought significant material innovations to clothing: nylon, introduced in 1939, transformed the hosiery industry, while man-made fibers such as rayon became widespread in everyday dressmaking. A growing fashion for sunbathing, outdoor leisure and resort travel—to destinations along the Mediterranean, the Bahamas and the coast of Florida—generated new categories of clothing for women, including beach pajamas, halter tops and backless swimwear, while white dinner jackets became standard resort wear for men.

Typical fashions in the 1930s

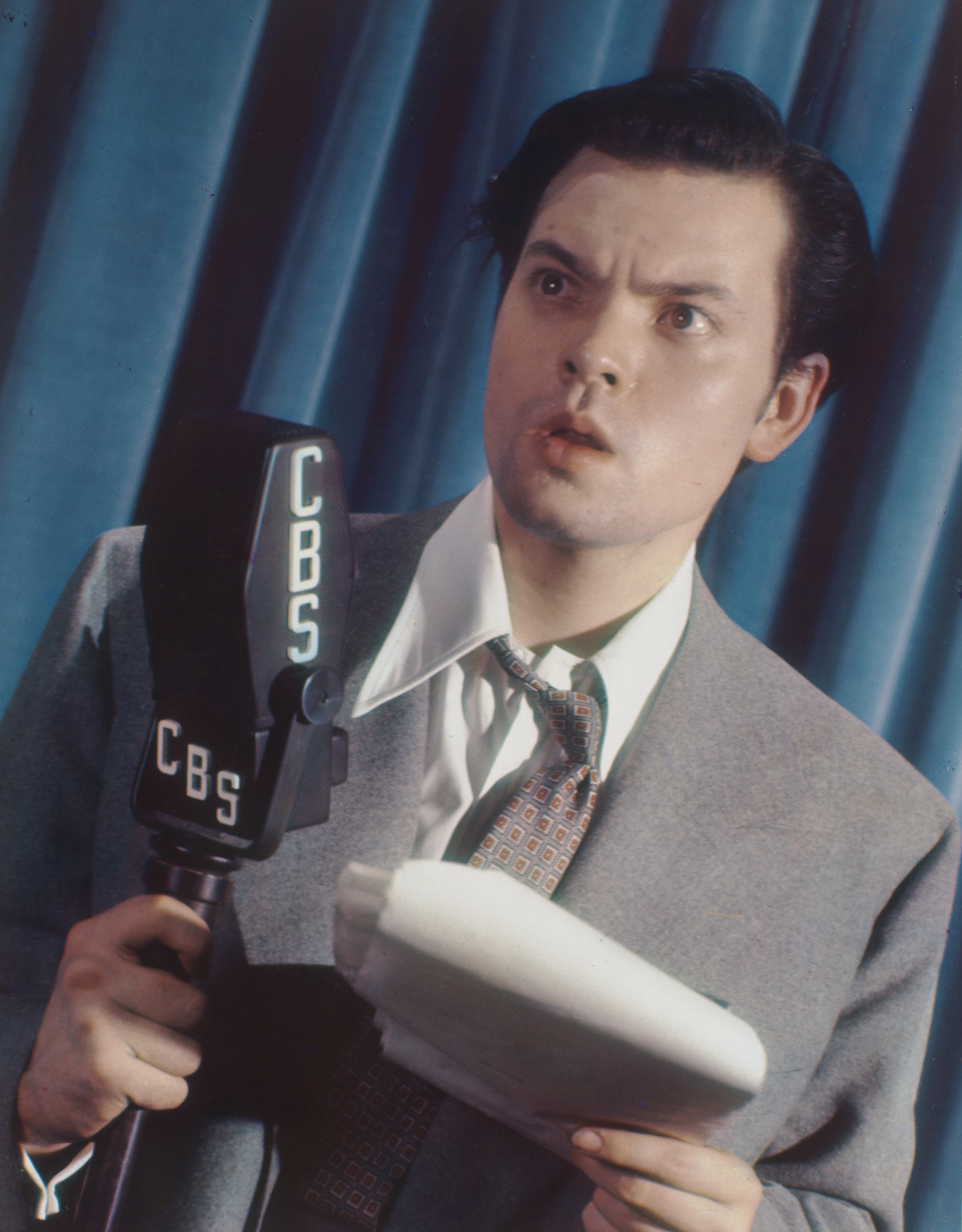

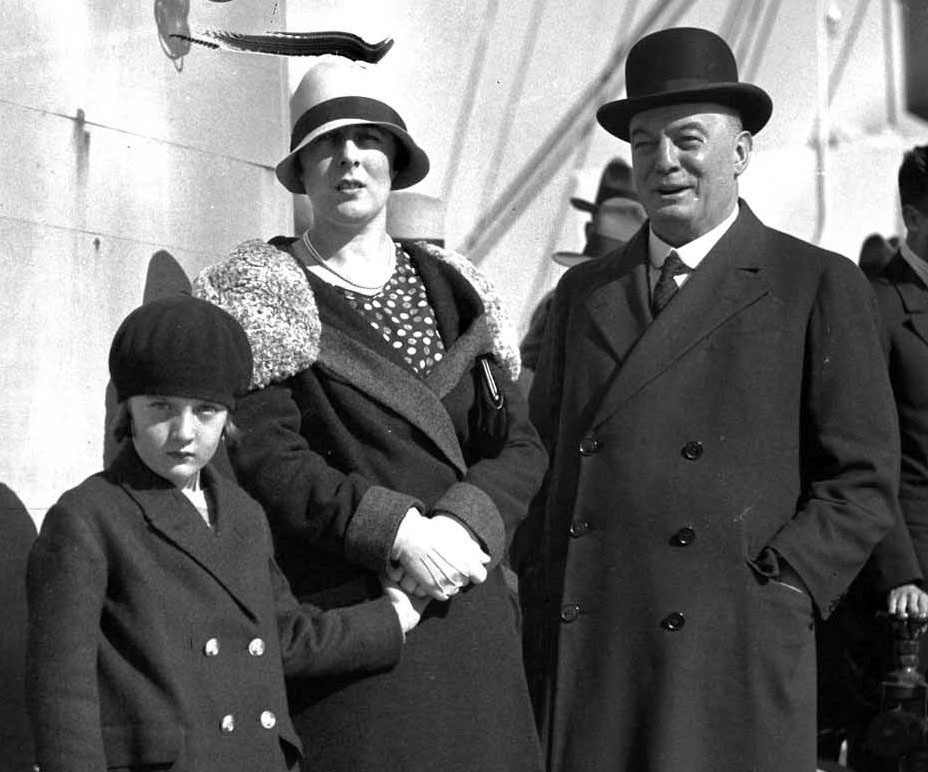

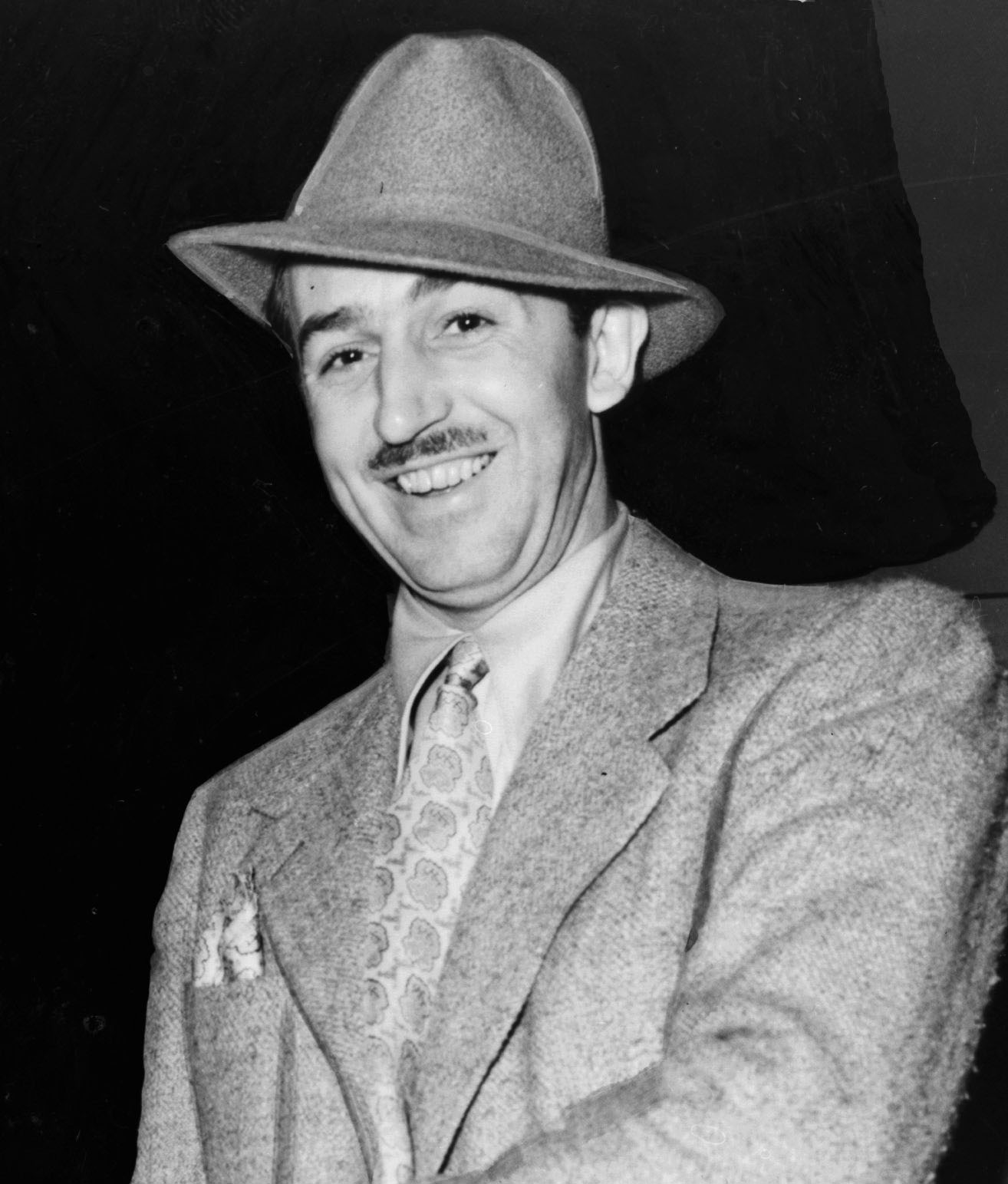

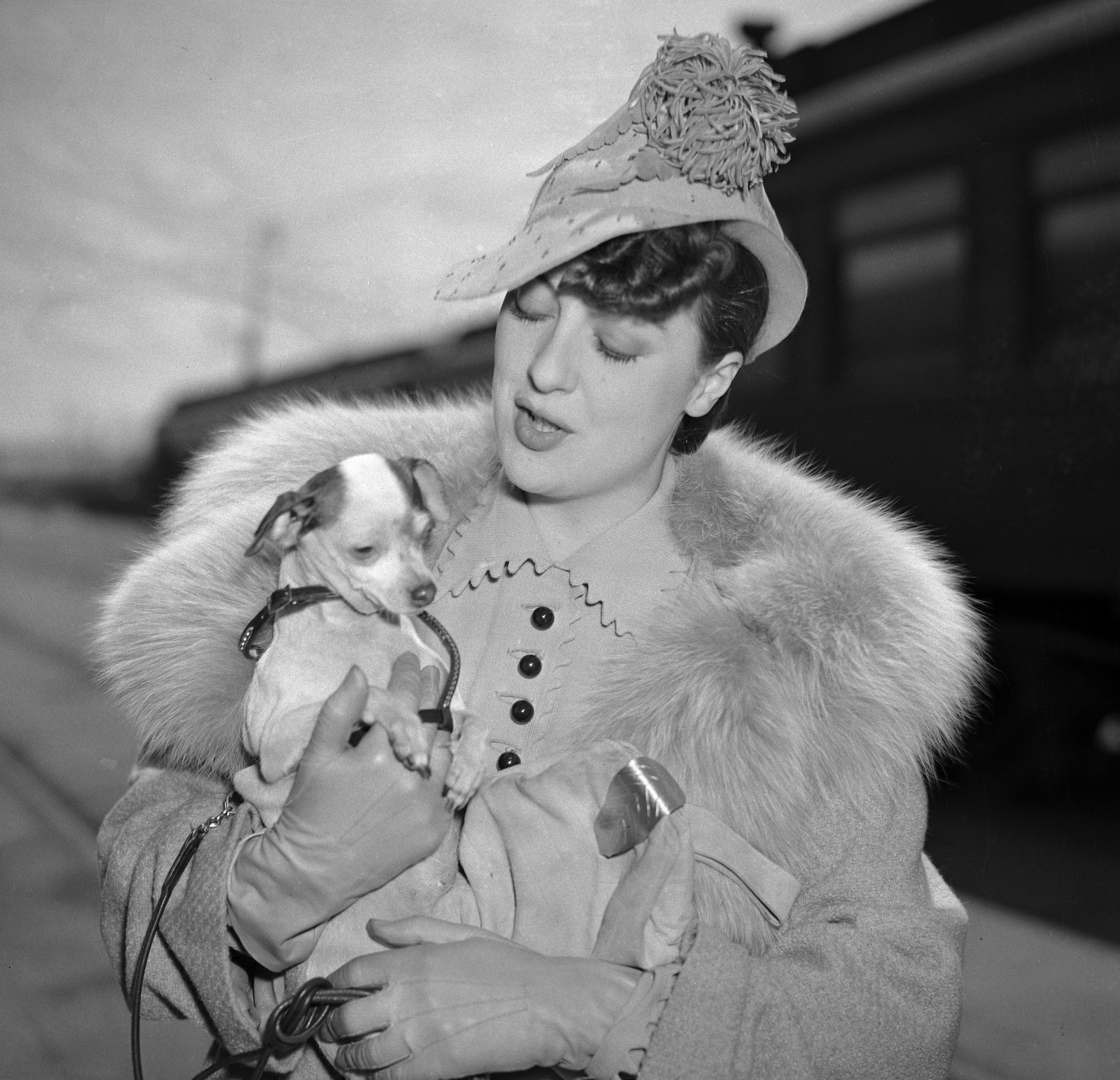

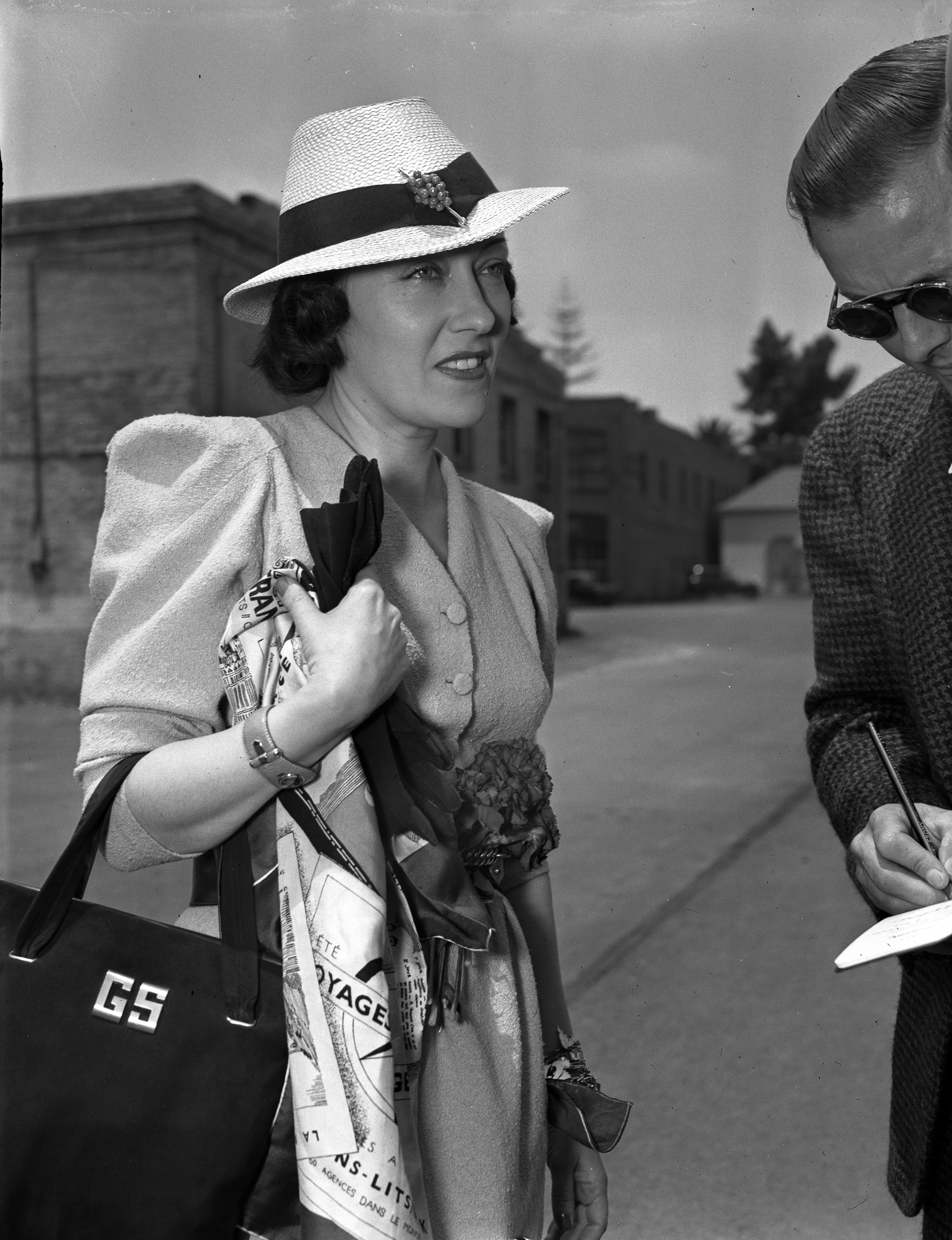

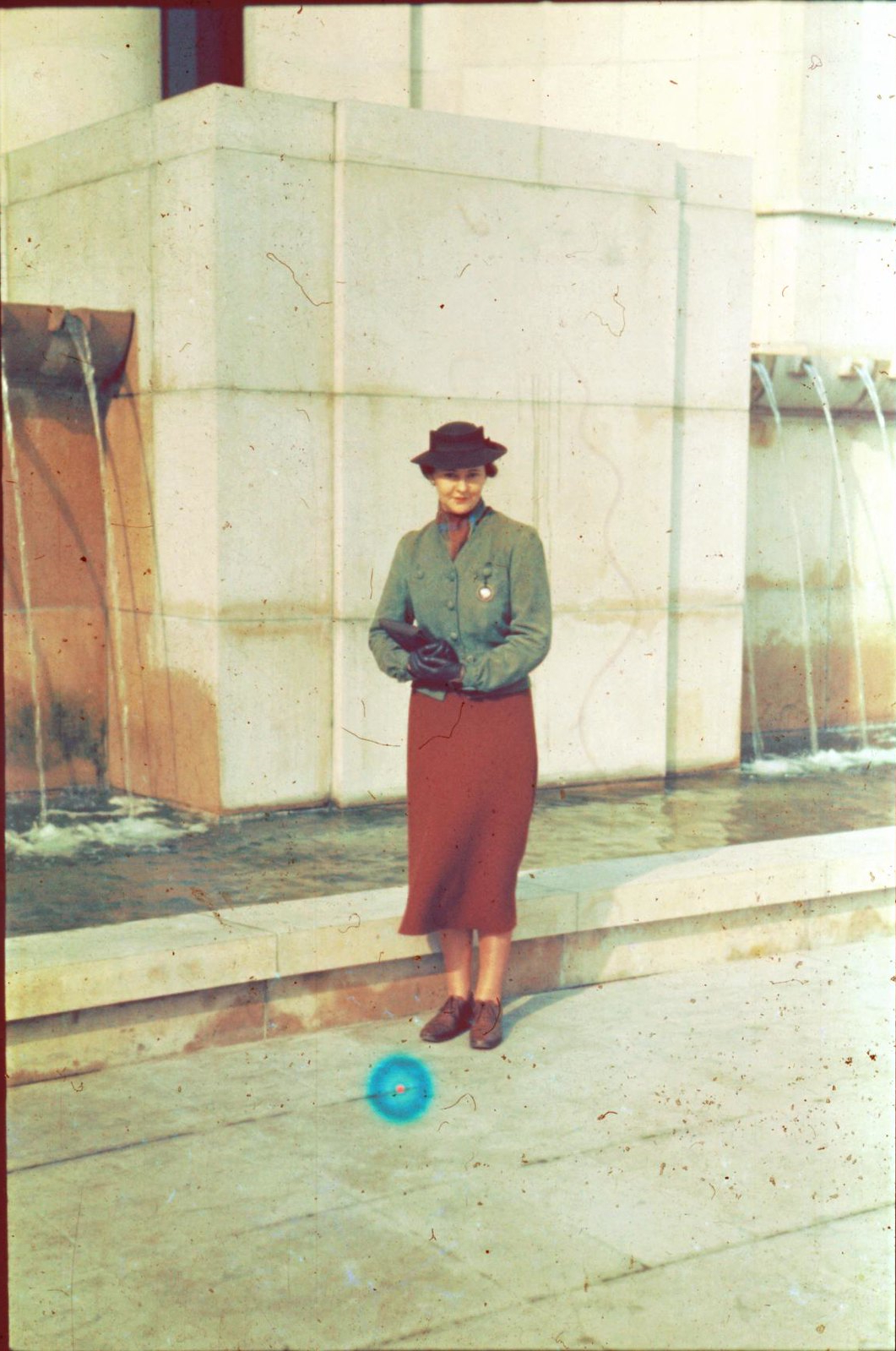

=== Architecture ===
- The world's tallest building (for the next 35 years) was constructed, opening as the Empire State Building on May 3, 1931, in New York City.
- The Golden Gate Bridge was constructed, opening on May 27, 1937, in San Francisco, USA.
- Kavanagh Building is completed in 1936, becoming the tallest skyscraper in Latin America until 1947.

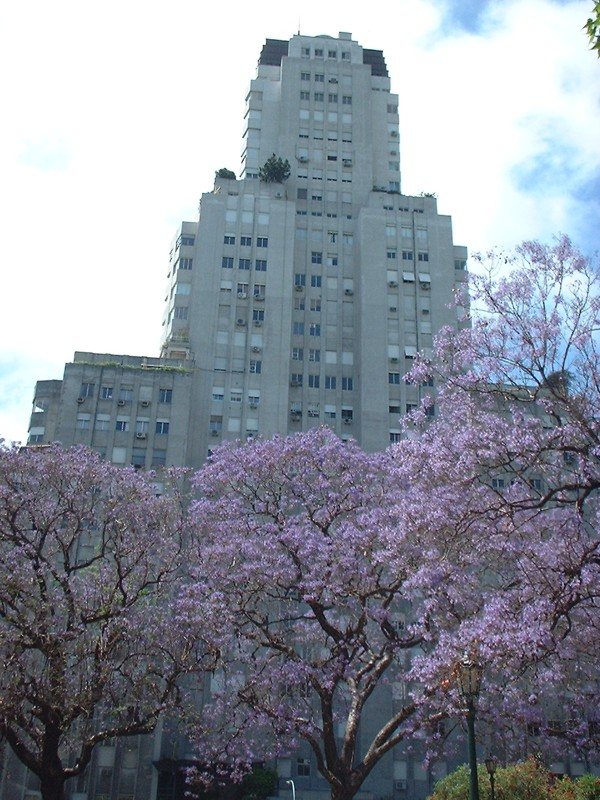
Kavanagh Building in Buenos Aires

=== Visual arts ===
Social realism became an important art movement during the Great Depression in the United States in the 1930s. Social realism generally portrayed imagery with socio-political meaning. Other related American artistic movements of the 1930s were American scene painting and Regionalism which were generally depictions of rural America, and historical images drawn from American history. Precisionism with its depictions of industrial America was also a popular art movement during the 1930s in the USA. During the Great Depression the art of photography played an important role in the Social Realist movement. The work of Dorothea Lange, Walker Evans, Margaret Bourke-White, Lewis Hine, Edward Steichen, Gordon Parks, Arthur Rothstein, Marion Post Wolcott, Doris Ulmann, Berenice Abbott, Aaron Siskind, Russell Lee, Ben Shahn (as a photographer) among several others were particularly influential.

The Works Progress Administration part of the Roosevelt Administration's New Deal sponsored the Federal Art Project, the Public Works of Art Project, and the Section of Painting and Sculpture which employed many American artists and helped them to make a living during the Great Depression.

Mexican muralism was a Mexican art movement that took place primarily in the 1930s. The movement stands out historically because of its political undertones, the majority of which of a Marxist nature, or related to a social and political situation of post-revolutionary Mexico. Also in Latin America Symbolism and Magic Realism were important movements.

In Europe during the 1930s and the Great Depression, Surrealism, late Cubism, the Bauhaus, De Stijl, Dada, German Expressionism, Symbolist and modernist painting in various guises characterized the art scene in Paris and elsewhere.

- The 1932 Winter Olympics were hosted by the village of Lake Placid, New York, United States.
- The 1932 Summer Olympics were hosted by the city of Los Angeles, California, United States.
- The 1934 FIFA World Cup was hosted and won by Italy.
- The 1936 Winter Olympics were hosted by the market town of Garmisch-Partenkirchen, Bavaria, Germany.
- The 1936 Summer Olympics were hosted by the city of Berlin, Germany. These were the last Summer or Winter Olympic Games held until 1948.
- The 1938 FIFA World Cup was hosted by France and won by Italy. This was the last FIFA World Cup held until 1950.

== People ==
=== Scientists and engineers ===
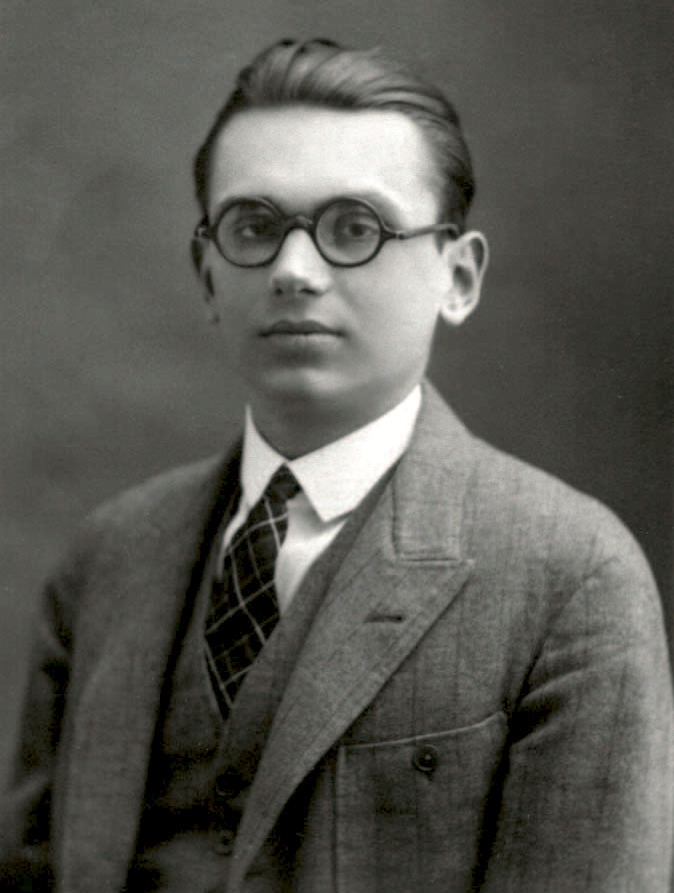
Kurt Gödel

- Albert Einstein
- Enrico Fermi
- James Chadwick
- Carl David Anderson
- Clyde W. Tombaugh
- Wallace Carothers
- Otto Hahn
- Irene Joliot-Curie
- Frederic Joliot
- Inge Lehmann
- Albert Szent-Gyorgyi
- Max Bergmann
- Leonidas Zervas
- Henrik Dam
- Kurt Gödel
- Alan Turing
- Leonid Kantorovich
- Sergei Sobolev
- Richard Drew
- Frank Whittle
- Igor Sikorsky
- Alan Blumlein
- Nigel Gresley
- Ferdinand Porsche
- Hans Nibel
- Hans Ledwinka
- Vittorio Jano
- Wifredo Ricart
- Ernst Ruska
- Konrad Zuse
- Edwin Armstrong
- Akira Nakashima

=== Actors/entertainers ===
- Fred Allen
- Jean Arthur
- Fred Astaire
- Mary Astor
- Gene Autry
- Tallulah Bankhead
- Warner Baxter
- Wallace Beery
- Constance Bennett
- Joan Bennett
- Jack Benny
- Charles Bickford
- Joan Blondell
- Humphrey Bogart
- Charles Boyer
- Mary Brian
- Louise Brooks
- Fanny Brice
- James Cagney
- Eddie Cantor
- Frank Capra
- John Carradine
- Madeleine Carroll
- Charlie Chaplin
- Claudette Colbert
- Ronald Colman
- Katharine Cornell
- Gary Cooper
- Joan Crawford
- Bing Crosby
- Bette Davis
- Marlene Dietrich
- Walt Disney
- Robert Donat
- Irene Dunne
- Deanna Durbin
- Ann Dvorak
- Nelson Eddy
- Alice Faye
- Errol Flynn
- Henry Fonda
- Joan Fontaine
- John Ford
- Kay Francis
- Dwight Frye
- Clark Gable
- Carlos Gardel
- Eva Le Gallienne
- Greta Garbo
- Judy Garland
- Janet Gaynor
- Cary Grant
- Lillian Gish
- Jean Harlow
- Olivia de Havilland
- Helen Hayes
- Katharine Hepburn
- Bob Hope
- Miriam Hopkins
- Leslie Howard
- Boris Karloff
- Buster Keaton
- Laurel and Hardy
- Dorothy Lamour
- Charles Laughton
- Vivien Leigh
- Carole Lombard
- Myrna Loy
- Bela Lugosi
- Fredric March
- The Marx Brothers
- Jeanette MacDonald
- Fred MacMurray
- Herbert Marshall
- Ethel Merman
- Robert Montgomery
- Paul Muni
- Merle Oberon
- Laurence Olivier
- Maureen O'Sullivan
- William Powell
- Tyrone Power
- George Raft
- Luise Rainer
- Basil Rathbone
- Ronald Reagan
- Dolores del Río
- Edward G. Robinson
- Ginger Rogers
- Will Rogers
- Cesar Romero
- Mickey Rooney
- Rosalind Russell
- Randolph Scott
- Sebastian Shaw
- Norma Shearer
- James Stewart
- Lionel Stander
- Barbara Stanwyck
- Margaret Sullavan
- Robert Taylor
- Shirley Temple
- The Three Stooges
- Spencer Tracy
- Rudy Vallee
- John Wayne
- Orson Welles
- Mae West
- Ed Wynn
- Loretta Young
- Devi Dja
- Ratna Asmara
- Roekiah
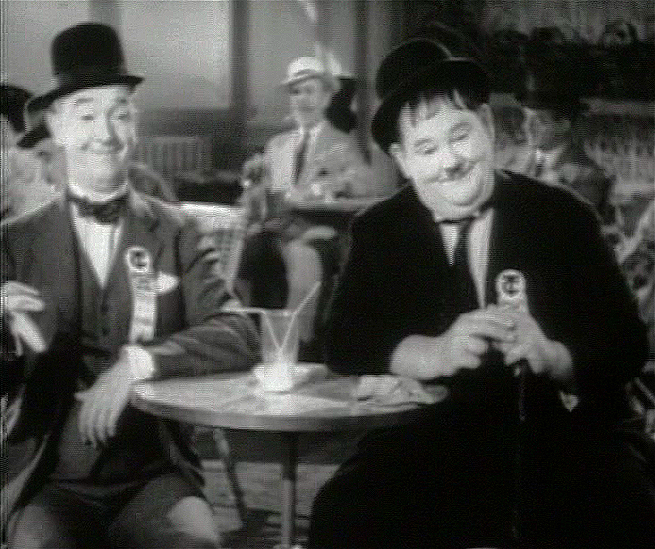
Laurel & Hardy in their film "The Flying Deuces" (1939)

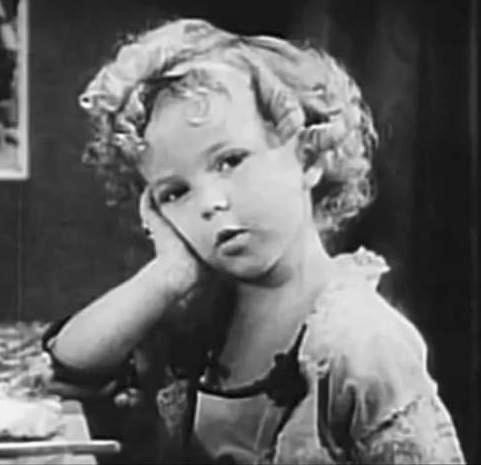
Shirley Temple, 1933

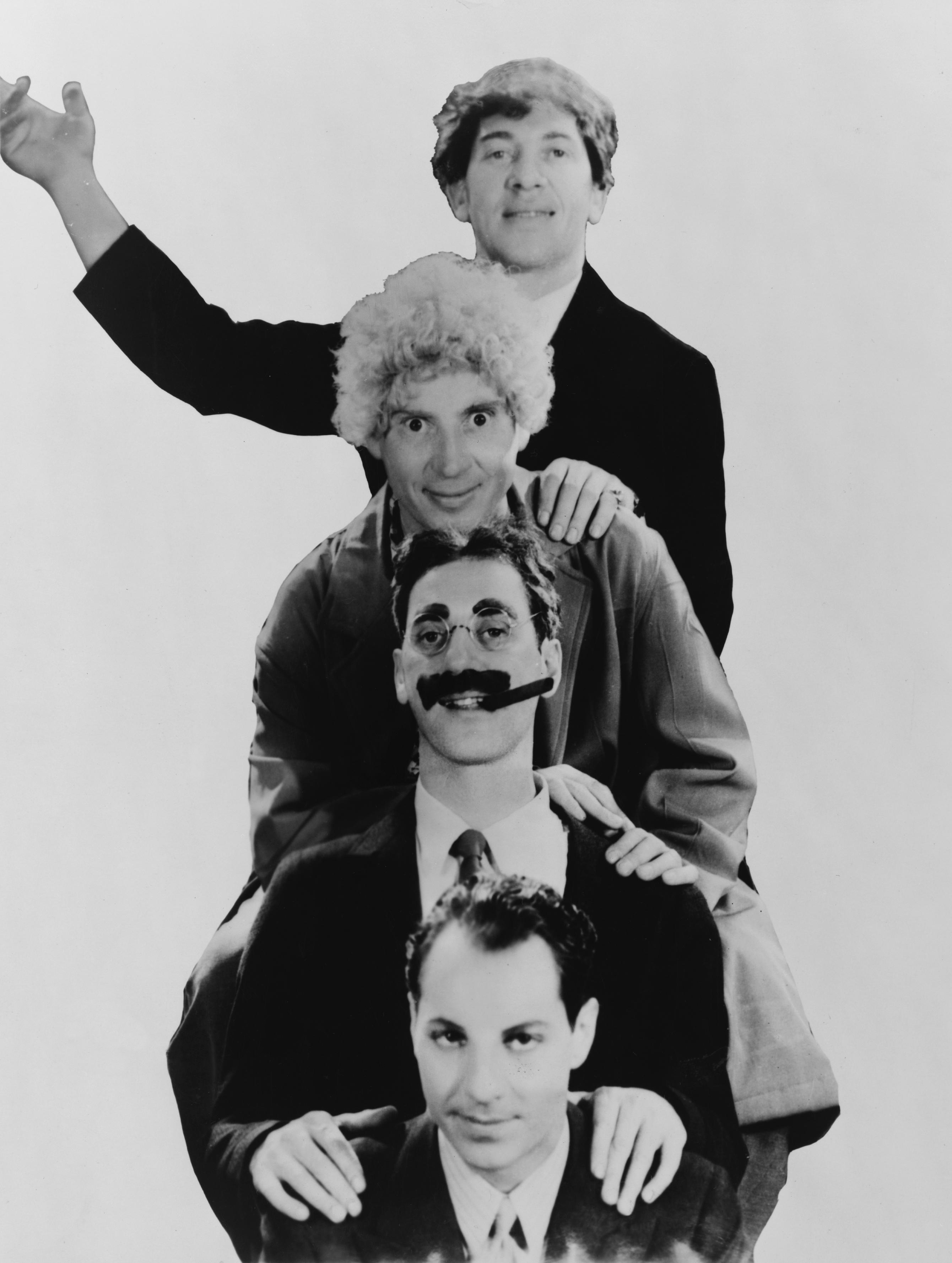
The Marx Brothers, 1931

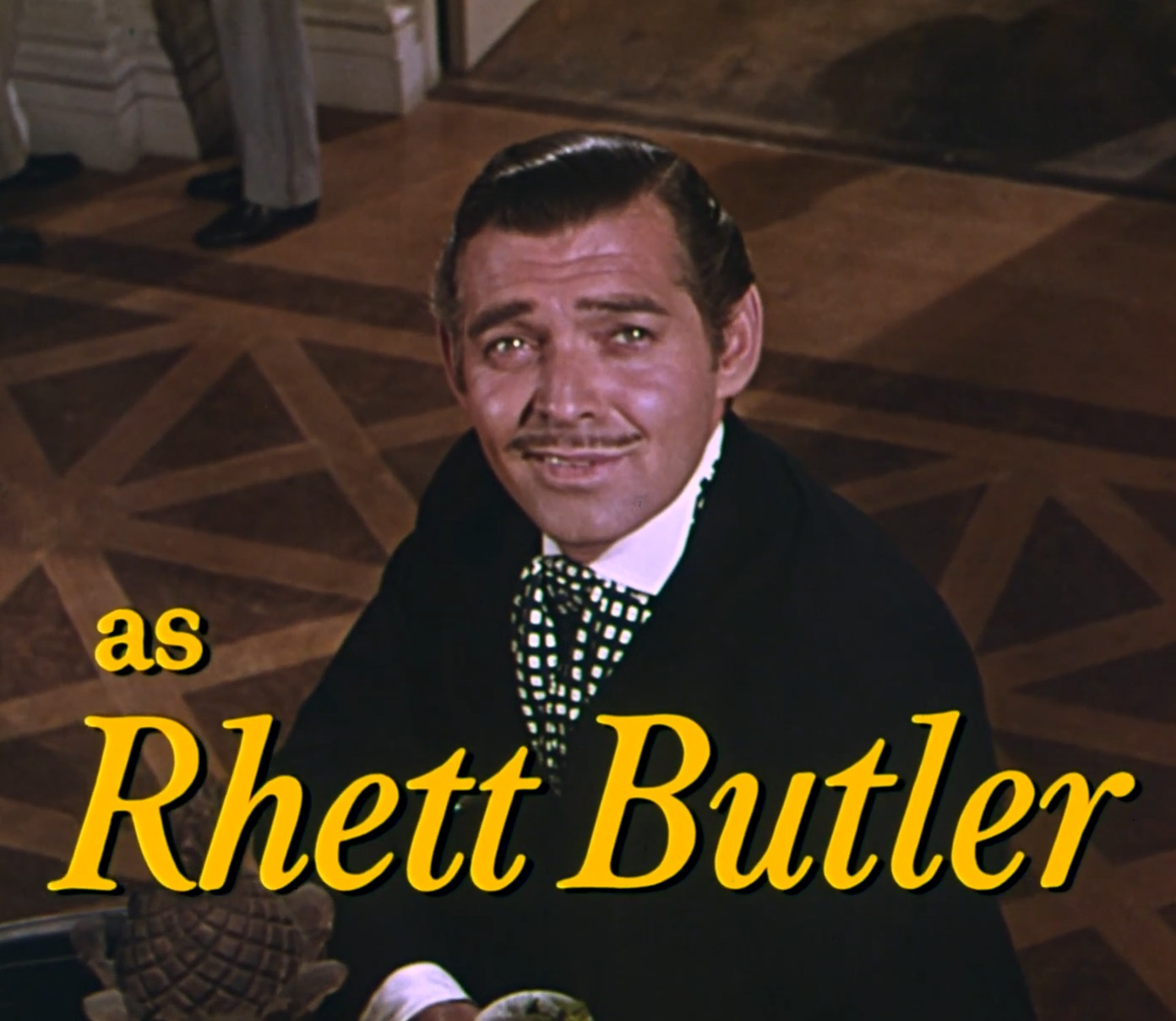
Clark Gable as Rhett Butler in the trailer for Gone with the Wind (1939)

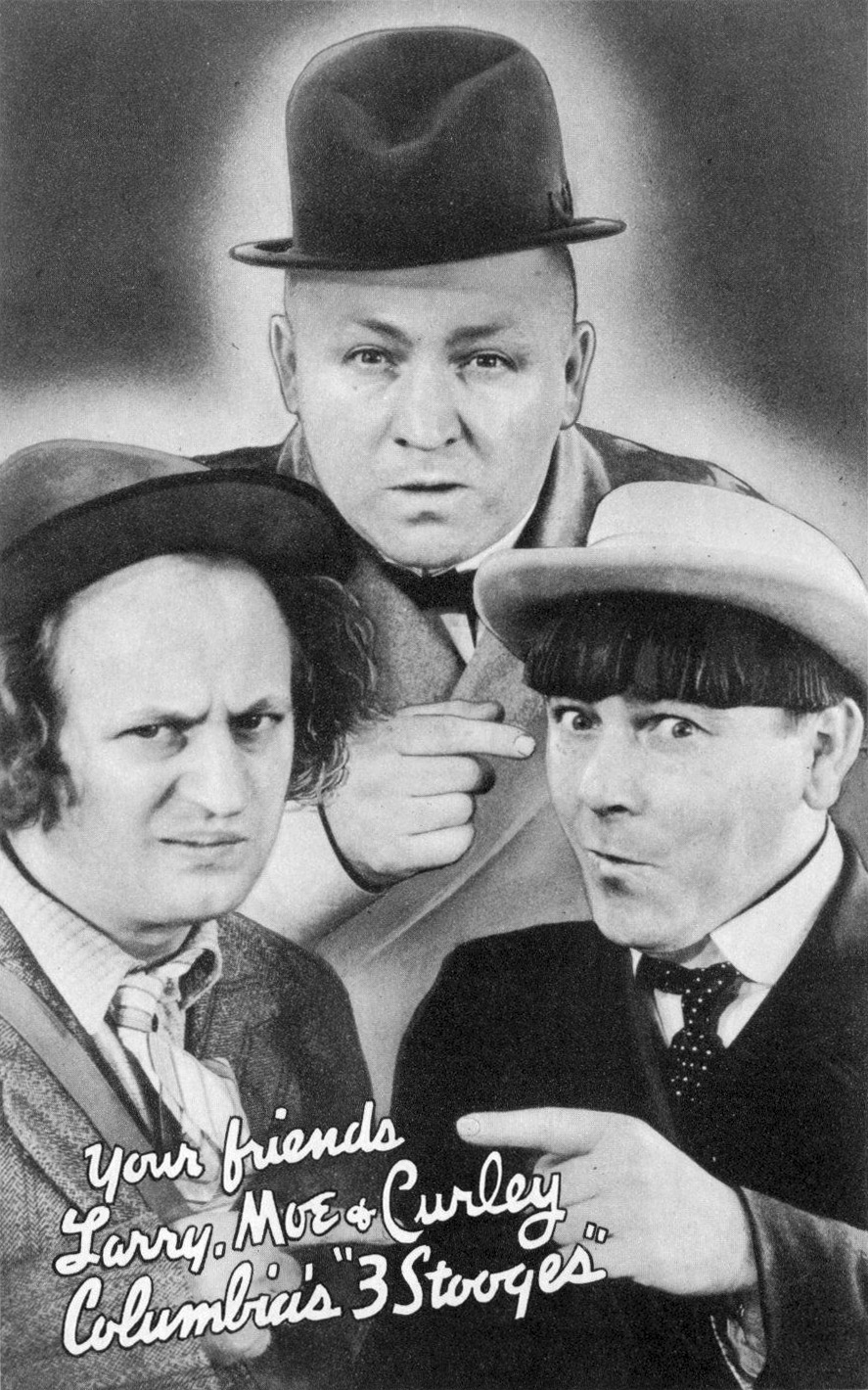
The Three Stooges

=== Filmmakers ===
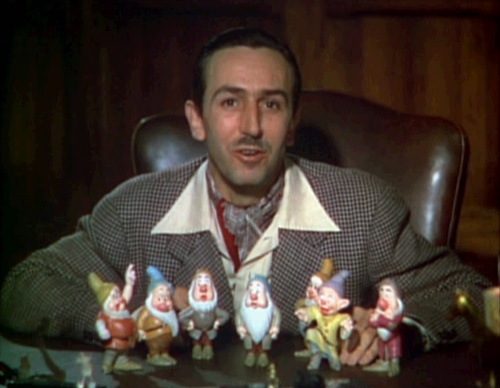
Walt Disney introduces each of the Seven Dwarfs in a scene from the original 1937 Snow White

- Walt Disney
- Alfred Hitchcock
- Fritz Lang
- John Ford
- Cecil B. DeMille
- Frank Capra
- Jean Renoir
- Ernst Lubitsch
- William Wyler
- Howard Hawks
- Victor Fleming
- George Cukor
- Michael Curtiz
- Josef von Sternberg

=== Musicians ===
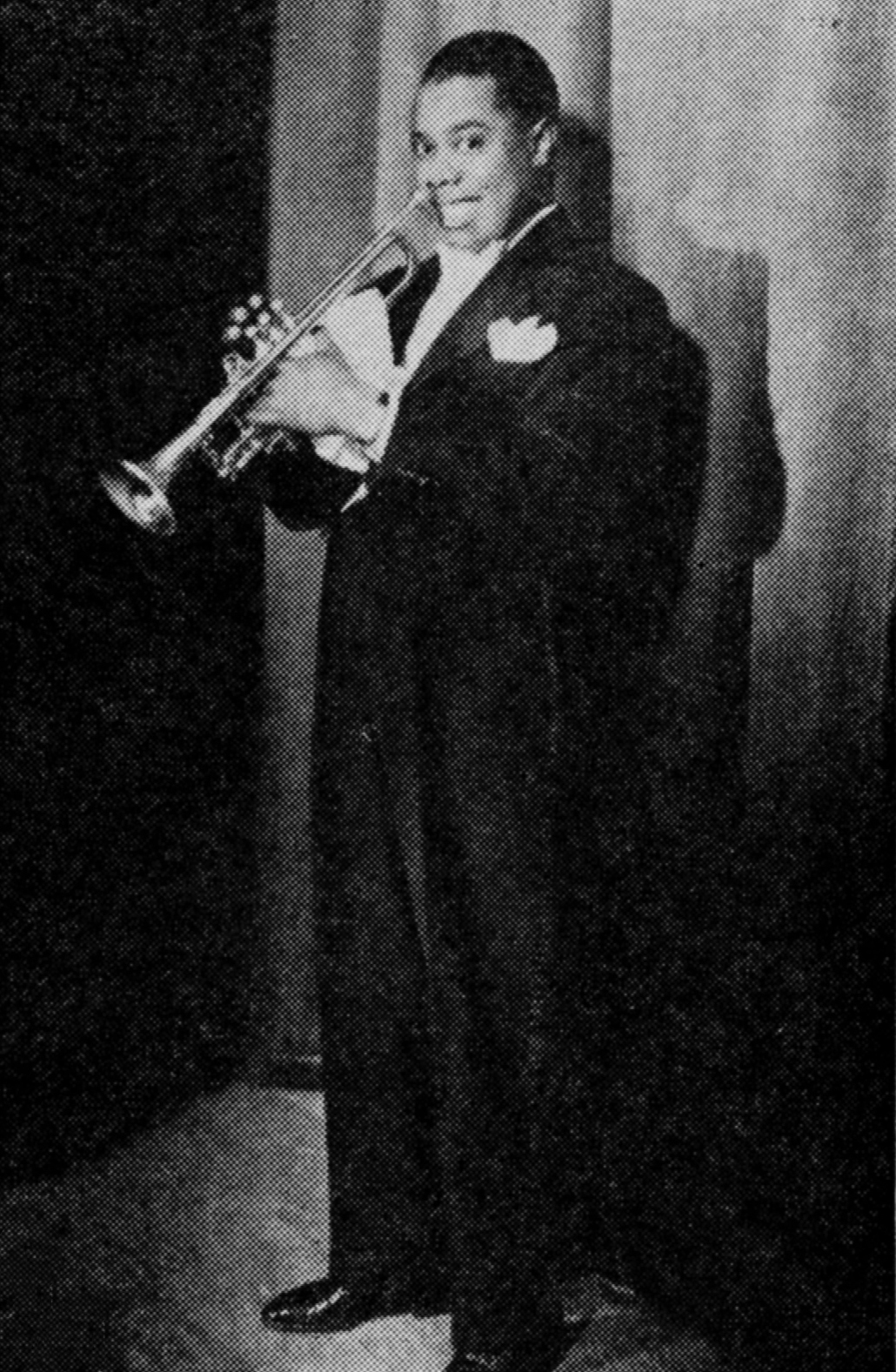
Louis Armstrong, 1936

- Lale Anderson
- Harold Arlen
- Louis Armstrong
- Fred Astaire
- Count Basie
- Dalida
- Cab Calloway
- Eddie Cantor
- Nat King Cole
- Noël Coward
- Bing Crosby
- Vernon Duke
- Jimmy Durante
- Duke Ellington
- Ella Fitzgerald
- George Gershwin
- Ira Gershwin
- Benny Goodman
- Coleman Hawkins
- Billie Holiday
- Pete Johnson
- Louis Prima
- Artie Shaw
- Big Joe Turner
- Les Brown
- Lena Horne
- Al Jolson
- Jerome Kern
- Lead Belly
- The Ink Spots
- Glenn Miller
- Earl Hines
- Édith Piaf
- Cole Porter
- Ma Rainey
- Django Reinhardt
- Bill "Bojangles" Robinson
- Rodgers and Hart
- Frank Sinatra
- Bessie Smith
- Rudy Vallee
- Fats Waller
- Ethel Waters

=== Influential artists ===
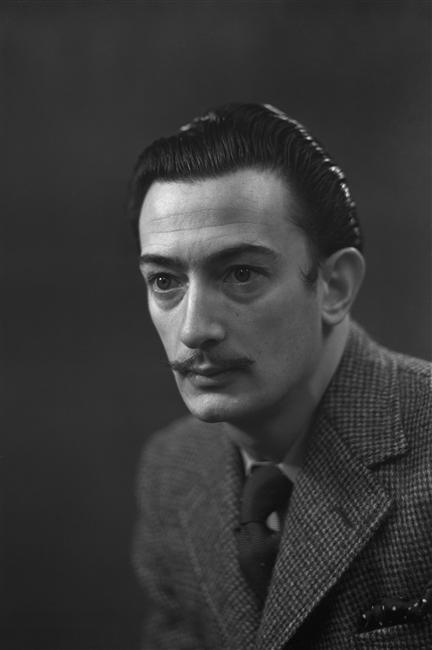
Salvador Dalí

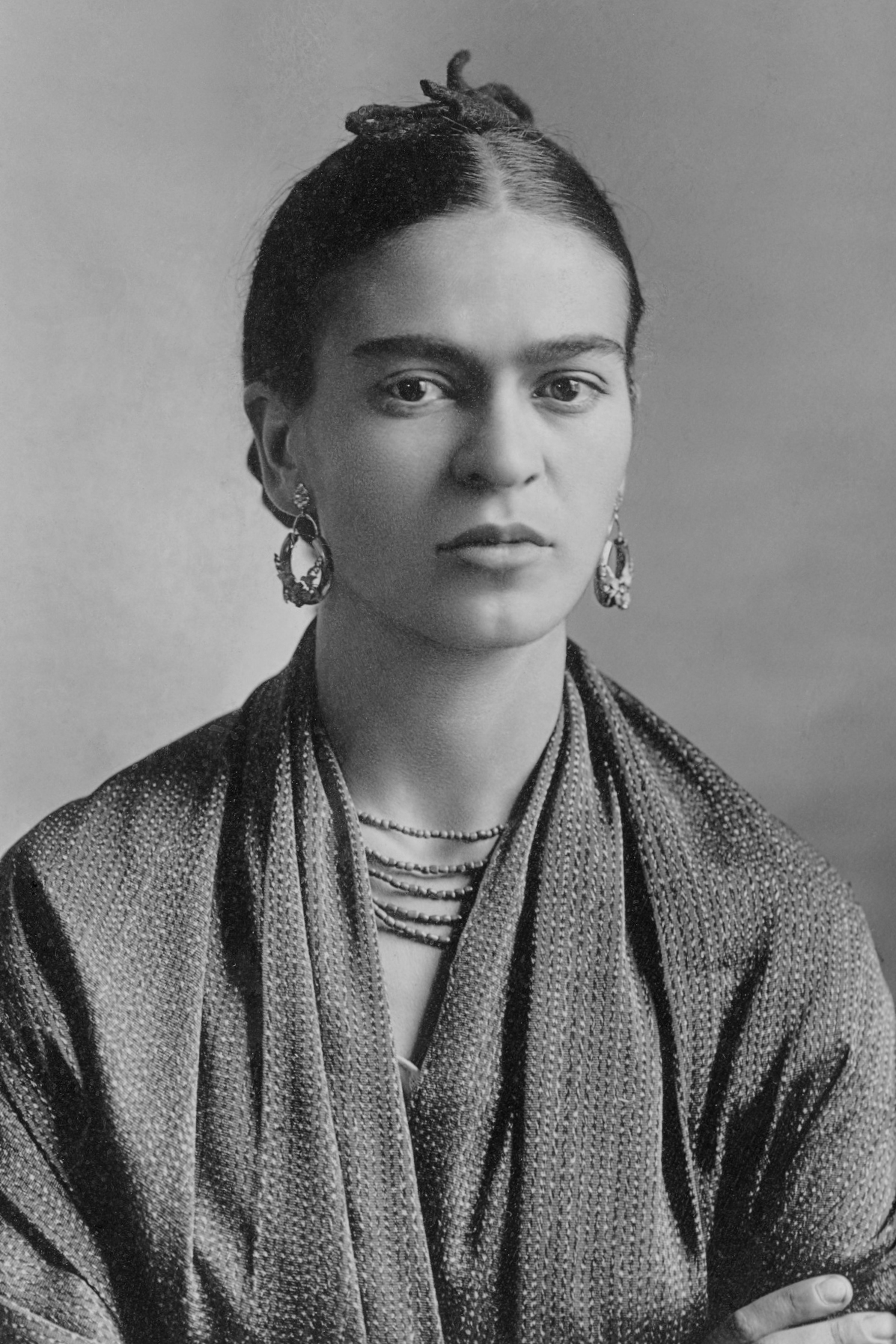
Frida Kahlo

==== Painters and sculptors ====
- José Clemente Orozco
- Anni Albers
- Josef Albers
- Hans Arp
- Milton Avery
- Romare Bearden
- Paula Modersohn-Becker
- Max Beckmann
- Thomas Hart Benton
- Max Bill
- Isabel Bishop
- Marcel Breuer
- Patrick Henry Bruce
- Paul Cadmus
- Marc Chagall
- John Steuart Curry
- Salvador Dalí
- Stuart Davis
- Charles Demuth
- Otto Dix
- Theo van Doesburg
- Arthur Dove
- Marcel Duchamp
- Max Ernst
- David Alfaro Siqueiros
- Philip Evergood
- Lyonel Feininger
- Joaquín Torres García
- Alberto Giacometti
- Arshile Gorky
- John D. Graham
- George Grosz
- Philip Guston
- Marsden Hartley
- Hans Hofmann
- Edward Hopper
- Johannes Itten
- Frida Kahlo
- Wassily Kandinsky
- Ernst Ludwig Kirchner
- Paul Klee
- Oskar Kokoschka
- Käthe Kollwitz
- Willem de Kooning
- Walt Kuhn
- Jacob Lawrence
- Tamara de Lempicka
- Fernand Léger
- Andrew Loomis
- Reginald Marsh
- André Masson
- Henri Matisse
- Joan Miró
- Piet Mondrian
- Gabriele Münter
- Georgia O'Keeffe
- Francis Picabia
- Pablo Picasso
- Horace Pippin
- Diego Rivera
- Ben Shahn
- Charles Sheeler
- David Smith
- Isaac Soyer
- Rafael Soyer
- Chaïm Soutine
- Rufino Tamayo
- Yves Tanguy
- Grant Wood
- N. C. Wyeth
- Andrew Wyeth

==== Photography ====
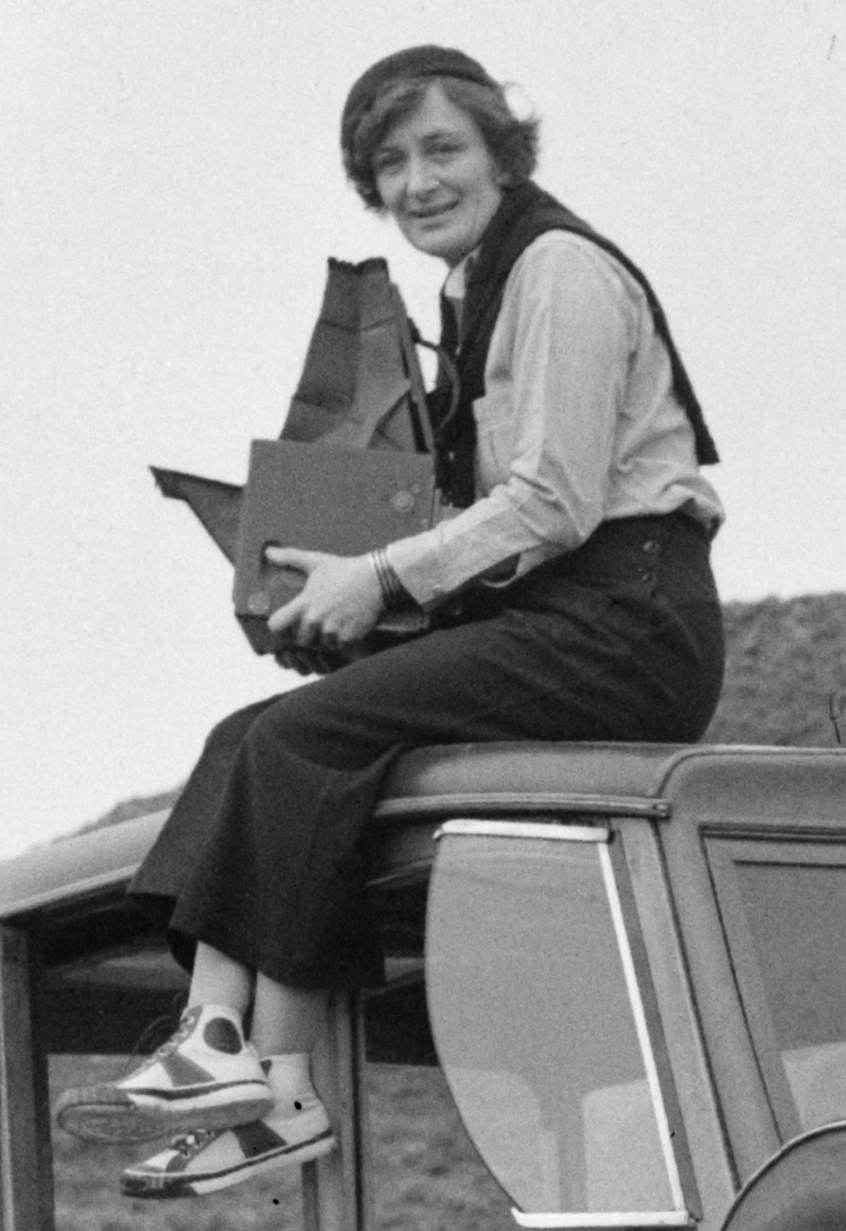
Dorothea Lange in 1936

- Ansel Adams
- Margaret Bourke-White
- Walker Evans
- Lewis Hine
- Yousuf Karsh
- Dorothea Lange
- Gordon Parks
- Man Ray
- Edward Steichen
- Carl Van Vechten
- Edward Weston

=== Sports figures ===
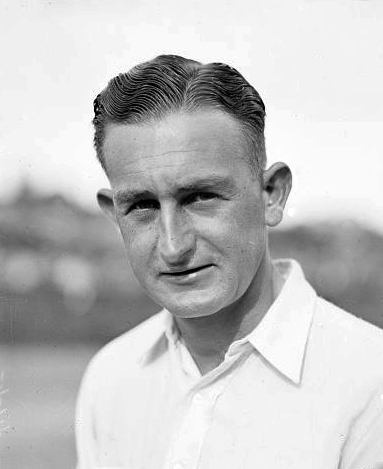
Jack Craword, Australian World number 1 tennis player

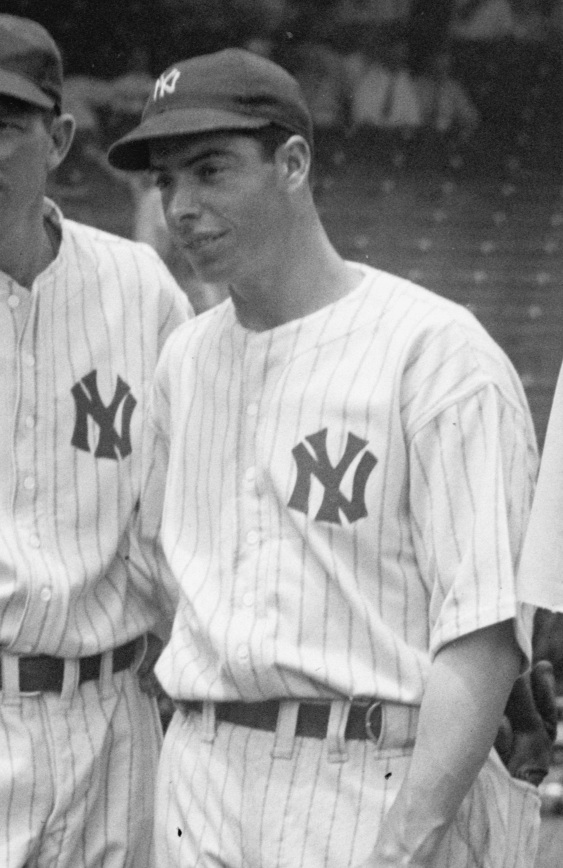
Joe DiMaggio, center fielder for the New York Yankees, 1937

==== Global ====
- Cliff Bastin (English footballer)
- Donald Bradman (Australian cricketer)
- Haydn Bunton, Sr (Australian Rules footballer)
- Jack Crawford (tennis)
- Jack Dyer (Australian rules football player)
- Wally Hammond (English cricketer)
- Eddie Hapgood (English footballer)
- George Headley (West Indies cricketer)
- Alex James (Scottish footballer)
- Douglas Jardine (English cricketer)
- Harold Larwood (English cricketer)
- Jack Lovelock (New Zealand runner)
- Fred Perry (English tennis player)
- Leonard Hutton, English cricketer
- Percy Williams (sprinter)
- Dhyan Chand, Indian hockey player
- Lala Amarnath, Indian cricketer
- Ricardo Zamora, Spanish association footballer
- Fradicek Planicka, Czechoslovak association footballer
- Guillermo Stabile, Argentinian association footballer
- Leonidas Da Sliva, Brazilian association footballer
- Tazio Nuvolari, Italian racing driver
- Achille Varzi, Italian racing driver
- Bernd Rosemeyer, German racing driver
- Rudolf Caracciola, German racing driver
- Richard Seaman, British racing driver
- Raymond Sommer, French racing driver
- Louis Chiron, Monegasque racing driver
- Gino Bartali, Italian Cyclist.

==== United States ====
- Joe Louis (boxing)
- Lou Ambers (boxing)
- Henry Armstrong (boxing)
- Max Baer (boxing)
- Cliff Battles (halfback)
- Jay Berwanger (halfback)
- James J. Braddock (boxing)
- Ellison M. ("Tarzan") Brown (marathon)
- Don Budge (tennis)
- Tony Canzoneri (boxing)
- Mickey Cochrane (baseball)
- Buster Crabbe (swimming)
- Glenn Cunningham (running)
- Dizzy Dean (baseball)
- Joe DiMaggio (baseball)
- Babe Didrikson (track)
- Leo Durocher (baseball)
- Turk Edwards (tackle)
- Jimmie Foxx (baseball)
- Lou Gehrig (baseball)
- Hank Greenberg (baseball)
- Lefty Grove (baseball)
- Dixie Howell (halfback)
- Don Hutson (end)
- Cecil Isbell (quarterback)
- Bobby Jones (golf)
- John A. Kelley (marathon)
- Nile Kinnick (halfback)
- Tommy Loughran (boxing)
- Alice Marble (tennis)
- Ralph Metcalfe (sprinter)
- Bronko Nagurski (fullback)
- Mel Ott (baseball)
- Jesse Owens (sprinter)
- Satchel Paige (baseball)
- Bobby Riggs (tennis)
- Barney Ross (boxing)
- Babe Ruth (baseball)
- Al Simmons (baseball)
- Helen Stephens (track)
- Eddie Tolan (sprinter)
- Ellsworth Vines (tennis)
- Stella Walsh (sprinter)
- Frank Wykoff (sprinter)

=== Criminals ===
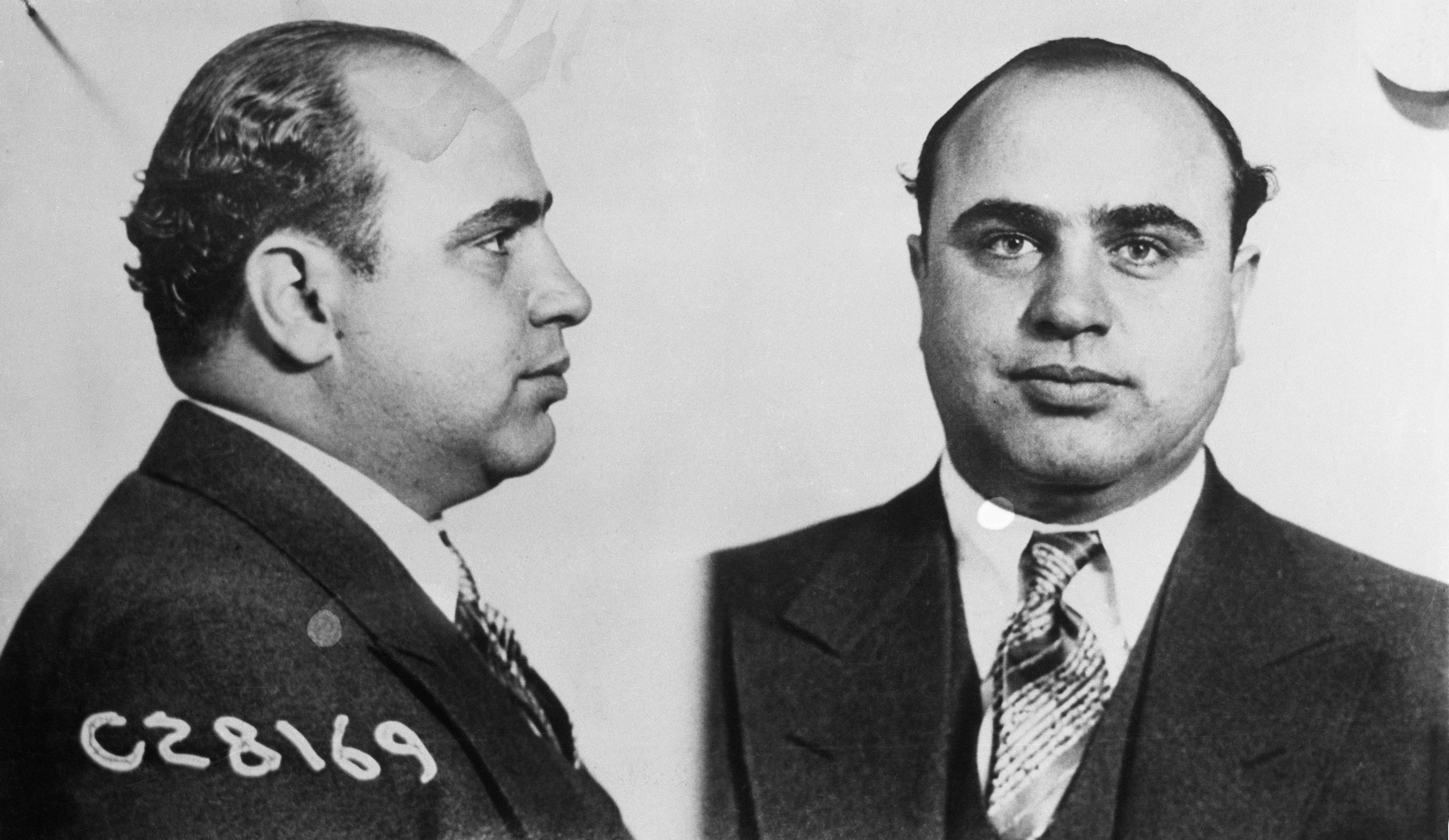
Al Capone

Prominent criminals of the Great Depression:

- Al Capone
- Bonnie and Clyde
- John Dillinger
- Baby Face Nelson
- Pretty Boy Floyd
- Alvin Karpis
- Machine Gun Kelly
- Ma Barker

== See also ==
- List of decades, centuries, and millennia
- Interwar period, worldwide
  - International relations (1919–1939)
  - Interwar Britain
  - Great Depression
    - Great Depression in the United States
    - European interwar economy
    - Causes of the Great Depression
    - Cities in the Great Depression
    - Dust Bowl
    - Entertainment during the Great Depression
    - Timeline of the Great Depression
- Timeline of events preceding World War II
  - Events preceding World War II in Asia
  - Events preceding World War II in Europe
- Areas annexed by Nazi Germany and the pre-war German territorial claims on them.
- Diplomatic history of World War II
- European Civil War
- List of years in literature § 1930s
- Interbellum Generation (the younger members of this demographic had matured in the early years of the decade).
- Greatest Generation (the decade when the majority of WW II vets came of age).

=== Timeline ===
The following articles contain brief timelines which list the most prominent events of the decade:

- 1930
- 1931
- 1932
- 1933
- 1934
- 1935
- 1936
- 1937
- 1938
- 1939
