= Goldmeister =

- Origin: Hamburg, Germany
- Genres: Jazz, swing, hip hop
- Years active: 2016–present
- Labels: Universal
- Members: Chris Dunker; Philipp Ohleyer
- Website: www.goldmeister-official.de

Goldmeister is a German duo that combines music from the 1920s with hip hop from the 1990s.

== History ==
Chris Dunker and Philipp Ohleyer had already played together for five years as part of the band Phoenix West before the two founded Goldmeister in 2016. The name is based on the two majors influences on the band: swing music from the Golden Twenties in Germany and Grandmaster Flash, one of the pioneers of hip hop. Their music combines Oldtime Jazz, Dixieland, Chicago Jazz, and swing with lounge and party-jazz of the 1960s. Their music is based on hip hop from the 1990s and 2000s, including Fettes Brot, Culcha Candela, Xavier Naidoo, Peter Fox and Jan Delay.

Their first single, Sie ist weg, (a cover of Die Fantastischen Vier) was released on April 6, 2018. On June 22, 2018, their debut album Alles Gold was released by Universal Music. The album reached No. 30 in the German album charts.

== Discography ==
- 2018: Sie ist weg (Single, Universal Music)
- 2018: Alles Gold (Album, Universal Music)
