= Golden Twenties =

Period during the 1920s in Germany

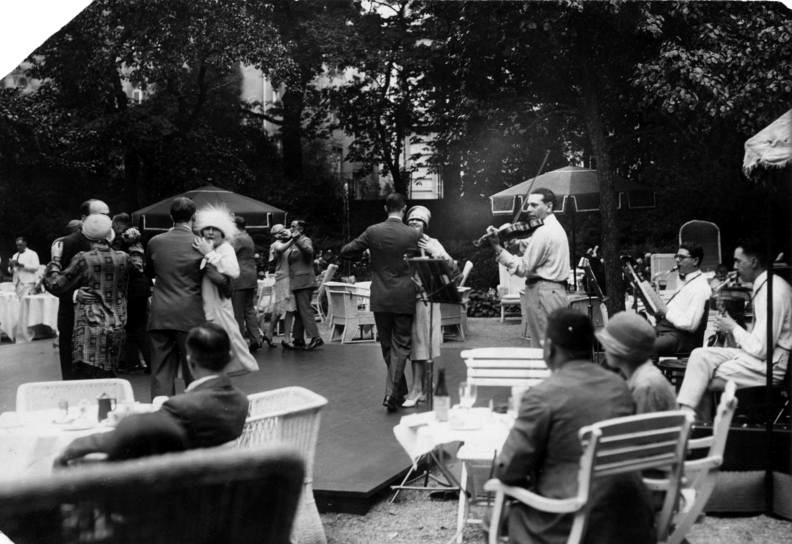
Tea dance in the garden of the Esplanade hotel in Berlin, 1926

The Golden Twenties (German: Goldene Zwanziger), also known as the Happy Twenties (German: Glückliche Zwanziger), was a five-year time period within the decade of the 1920s in the Weimar Republic. The era began in 1924, after the end of the hyperinflation following World War I, and ended with the Wall Street crash of 1929.

The German term is often applied to the country's experience of healthy economic growth and spurt in experimental and creative efforts in the field of art, such as Bauhaus. Before this period, the Weimar Republic had experienced record-breaking levels of inflation of one trillion percent between January 1919 and November 1923. The inflation was so severe that printed currency was often used as domestic fuel, and everyday requirements such as food, soap and electricity cost a wheelbarrow full of banknotes. It was only after radical economic reform measures initiated by Gustav Stresemann, such as introduction of a new currency, the Rentenmark, tighter fiscal control and a reduction in bureaucratic hurdles led to an environment of economic stability and prosperity in Germany.

In the United States, the corresponding period was called the Roaring Twenties; in France, it was known as Les Années folles.

== Culture of Weimar Germany ==
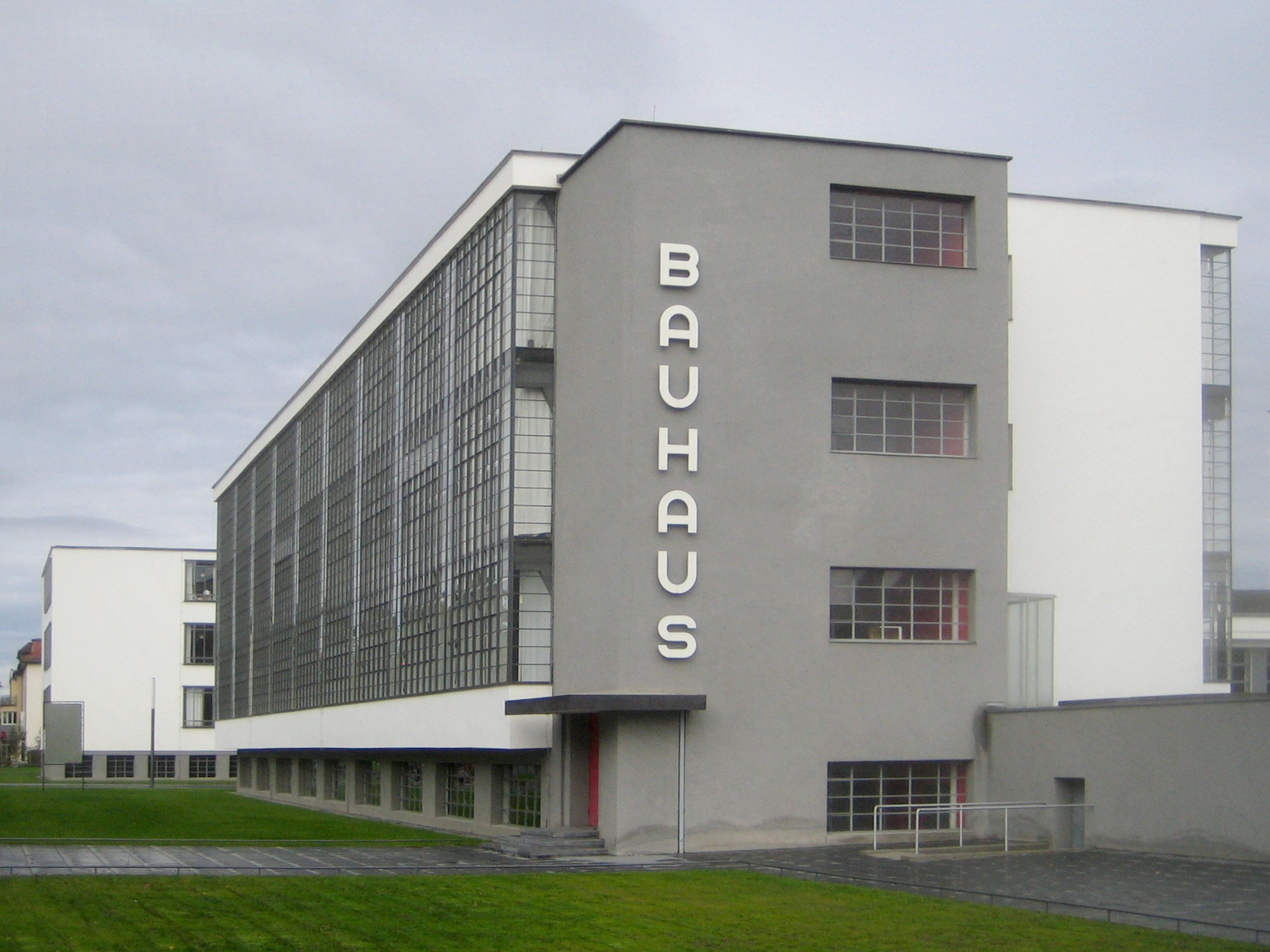
Bauhaus Dessau, built from 1925 to 1926 to a design by Walter Gropius

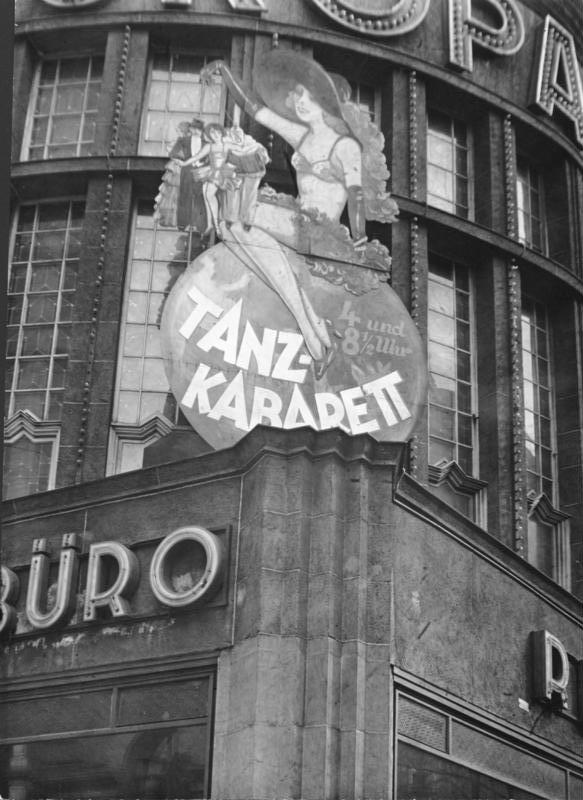
The Europahaus, one of the hundreds of cabarets in Weimar Berlin, 1931

Weimar culture was the flourishing of the arts and sciences in Germany during the Weimar Republic, from 1918 until Adolf Hitler's rise to power in 1933. 1920s Berlin was at the hectic center of the Weimar culture. Although not part of Germany, German-speaking Austria, and particularly Vienna, is often included as part of Weimar culture. Bauhaus was a German art school operational from 1919 to 1933 that combined crafts and the fine arts. Its goal of unifying art, craft, and technology became influential worldwide, especially in architecture.

Germany, and Berlin in particular, was fertile ground for intellectuals, artists, and innovators from many fields. The social environment was chaotic, and politics were passionate. German university faculties became universally open to Jewish scholars in 1918. Leading Jewish intellectuals on university faculties included physicist Albert Einstein; sociologists Karl Mannheim, Erich Fromm, Theodor Adorno, Max Horkheimer, and Herbert Marcuse; philosophers Ernst Cassirer and Edmund Husserl; sexologist Magnus Hirschfeld; political theorists Arthur Rosenberg and Gustav Meyer; and many others. Nine German citizens were awarded Nobel Prizes during the Weimar Republic, five of whom were Jewish scientists, including two in medicine.

Sport took on a new importance as the human body became a focus that pointed away from the heated rhetoric of standard politics. The new emphasis reflected the search for freedom by young Germans alienated from rationalized work routines.

== The Golden Twenties in Germany ==
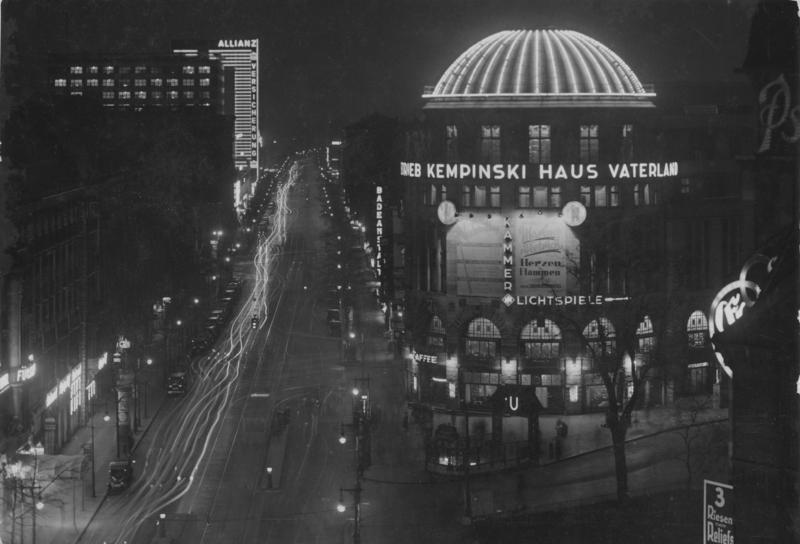
Amusement temples like the Haus Vaterland in Berlin were symbols for the new freedoms of the 1920s

The Golden Twenties in Germany is often referred to as a borrowed time, meaning that this time of exploring the arts, humanities, freedom, and financial stability was atypical and would soon end. The United States was the only country to come out of World War I without debt or reparations to pay. Germany owed a huge sum and had to take a loan from the US just to survive. No one had any hint that there would be a stock market crash with worldwide repercussions and that this crash would ruin Germany and set the stage for Hitler to come into power. Thus, the expression of a "borrowed time" came to being.

Germany shared many similar social trends with France and America at this time, such as the famous women's haircut called "the Bob" or "Bob cut", exploring clothing fashions, cabaret dancers, and performances, and dancing "the Charleston".

The art movement known as New Objectivity originated in Germany during this time.

== Cabaret ==
Cabaret dancing was the first form of "strip tease". Customers often sat at a table in a night club or pub and waited to be entertained by the performances of nearly naked girls. These were much like the productions of the Moulin Rouge in Paris, France, during this time.

Anita Berber was a famous, even infamous, cabaret dancer during this time. She was known to have danced naked on top of her customers' tables, often while urinating on them and the table and/or hitting them with champagne bottles.

== Prominent figures ==
- Anita Berber (10 June 1899 – 10 November 1928) was a German dancer, actress, and writer who was the subject of an Otto Dix painting. She lived during the Weimar period.
- Comedian Harmonists were an all-male German close harmony ensemble.
- Marlene Dietrich (27 December 1901 – 6 May 1992) was a German-American actress and singer.
- Otto Dix (2 December 1891 – 25 July 1969) was a German painter and printmaker noted for his harshly realistic depictions of Weimar society and the brutality of war. Along with George Grosz, he is widely considered one of the most important artists of the New Objectivity (Neue Sachlichkeit) trend.
- Fritz Lang (5 December 1890 – 2 August 1976) was the director of Metropolis, a 1927 German expressionist epic science-fiction drama film. This famous film is iconic for its advanced special effects and depiction of technological and scientific themes.
- Thomas Mann (6 June 1875 – 12 August 1955) was a German novelist, short story writer, social critic, philanthropist, essayist, and the 1929 Nobel Prize in Literature laureate. He became famous during this time for writing the novel The Magic Mountain (Der Zauberberg).

== See also ==
- 1920s Berlin
- Weimar culture
- Roaring Twenties, the equivalent in North America
- European interwar economy
