= Penny auction (foreclosure) =

Auction tactic

A penny auction is a collective action taken during the auction of a foreclosed property to force the sale of the property at a low price, with the intent of then returning the property to its previous owner. The process—usually achieved with a combination of intimidation, threats, and physical force—effectively circumvents foreclosure by forcing the lender to relinquish the property without an opportunity to recuperate the balance of the loan.

The term arose during the foreclosure of farms during the Great Depression in the United States. Neighbors would gather in large numbers at the auction and place bids of only a few pennies, while intimidating anyone who attempted to bid competitively. In the end, the bank that owned the farm would get whatever was bid and the neighbors would return the farm and its contents to the farmer.

== See also ==
- Merle Hansen
- Farmers' Holiday Association
- Occupy Homes
- Damnation (TV series)
- Bidding fee auction, or penny auction
