= Merle Hansen =

American farmer (1919–2009)

Merle Hansen (November 11, 1919 – March 27, 2009) was the founding president of the North American Farm Alliance and a spokesman for the plight of family farmers.

== Background ==
Merle Elwin Hansen was born on his family's farmstead north of Newman Grove, Nebraska. After graduating from Newman Grove High School in 1938, Merle attended a business college in Chillicothe, Missouri.

Hansen viewed farm policy as an issue of social justice and often urged farmers to align themselves with minorities, environmentalists, the urban poor, labor unions, and other constituencies often regarded as marginalized in American culture. During the Great Depression, Hansen's father was active in the Farmers' Holiday Association, a farm protest organization that advocated the withholding of farm commodities from markets as a means of raising farm prices, and the use of penny auctions as a means of stopping farm foreclosures. The Holiday's plan for increasing prices never proved feasible, but the "penny auctions" were occasionally successful in preventing banks from foreclosing on individual farmers.

In many well-publicized cases, Association members would attend a farm sale regarded by Association members as morally or legally questionable. After bidding no more than a few pennies on each item put up by the auctioneer, they would return everything to the original owners immediately following the auction. Local law enforcement officials often discovered they were powerless to stop these tactics, and individuals at the auction who made earnest bids on the items in the sale were often intimidated into silence by Association members.

Hansen's town of Newman Grove was home to one of the movement's most successful locals. Often meeting in an auto-repair garage owned by Hansen's family, the "Madison County" chapter of the Association gained national attention for several successful actions, including the orchestration of a "penny auction" in Elgin, NE and the reacquisition of farmer-owned property that had been seized by banks. Deeply affected by these early experiences of direct action and radical populism, Hansen referenced the Association throughout his career.

== World War II ==
On December 8, 1941, Hansen enlisted in the US Navy as a petty officer. He served mostly in the Pacific theatre and was awarded six battle stars. Following the war, he worked out of Omaha as a multi-state field organizer for the American Veterans Committee, a progressive veterans organization formed to oppose the more conservative American Legion.

== Farmers Union ==
In the late 1940s, Hansen also worked as a field organizer for the South Dakota Farmers Union, and later for the Iowa Farmers Union, where he worked under IFU President Frederick William Stover (1898–1990), the former liaison between the USDA and the Roosevelt White House. Stover was a close ally of former Vice President Henry C. Wallace and one of the policy authors of the New Deal's innovative but controversial agricultural reforms. Stover would become Hansen's mentor, teaching him many of the Byzantine intricacies of federal farm policy and remaining a close ally and partner of Hansen's from the 1950s to the 1980s.

During his time in Iowa with Farmers Union, Hansen became a close friend and supporter of the prominent African American activist Edna Griffin, the organizer of one of the nation's first desegregation campaigns. While working with Griffin in her efforts to integrate Katz Drug Store in Des Moines, Hansen developed a friendship with the Griffin family and became an early and enthusiastic supporter of the civil rights movement. Griffin's husband, an African-American doctor, was the attending physician at the birth of two of Hansen's children.

At the outbreak of the Korean War, a conflict erupted between Stover and the National Farmers Union, with Stover opposing American intervention and NFU President James Patton supporting President Truman, with whom he had a close working relationship. This conflict caused the Iowa Farmers Union to splinter into bitterly opposed factions and eventually would cause Stover's removal as state president. In the midst of the controversy, Hansen returned to his family's farm in Madison County, Nebraska. Throughout the 1950s, he continued his involvement in farm politics, serving as a vice president of the U.S. Farmers Association which as newly formed by Fred Stover and working with the local chapter of the burgeoning National Farmers Organization.

In the 1970s, Hansen served as the president of Nebraskans For Peace, an anti-war and social justice organization. He also served as a state officer in the American Agriculture Movement, the militant farm organization responsible for orchestrating the "tractorcades," a public relations spectacle in which hundreds of farmers drove their tractors through the city streets of Washington DC.

== North American Farm Alliance ==
In 1983, as the nation's farm crisis deepened, Hansen was elected to serve as the founding chairman of the North American Farm Alliance, a farm protest organization that advocated a return to Roosevelt's New Deal farm policies. The group also sought to construct an active coalition between family farmers and other groups perceived as disenfranchised or marginalized in American life. The group's coalition building included outreach to environmentalists, civil rights organizations, the urban poor, and farmers in developing countries.

In August 1983, Hansen and other family farm leaders met with Jesse Jackson in Washington, D.C. during the 20th anniversary of the March on Washington for Jobs and Freedom. When Jackson announced his presidential candidacy a short while later, Hansen became his chief adviser on agricultural policy. Against the advice of many of his advisors, who told him it would be futile to court rural farmers, Jackson adopted many of Hansen's suggestions.

Jackson attended numerous farm protest rallies and his electoral performance in rural counties often surpassed expectations. At the 1984 Democratic National Convention, Hansen was asked by Jackson to make one of the three speeches formally entering his name into nomination as a candidate. The other nominating speeches were made by future Congresswoman Maxine Waters and Washington, D.C. mayor Marion Barry. In 1985, Hansen traveled to Africa with Jackson, meeting with Ministers of Agriculture while Jackson met with heads of state. In 1988, he again worked with Jackson on his presidential campaign. He attended the 1988 Democratic National Convention as an Alternate Delegate and contributed substantially to that year's platform debate on agricultural policy.

In addition to his role as President of the North American Farm Alliance, Hansen also served as vice president of the National Save the Family Farm Coalition. In 1985, Hansen was an active supporter of the first Farm Aid concert, and was heavily involved with the crafting of Farm Aid's political message and the distribution of the financial proceeds from the first concert's ticket sales.

Throughout the 1980s, Hansen was a prominent spokesman for the concerns of family farmers, often speaking at rallies, protest actions, and with media representatives. He was featured prominently in publications ranging from USA Today, to The New York Times, to Ms. Magazine. As President of the North American Farm Alliance, his primary responsibility was communications outreach and coalition building. An articulate speaker, Hansen's message reached audiences throughout the United States and around the world.

== Later years ==
In 1990, he largely retired from active involvement in politics, with the notable exception of his endorsement and support of Ralph Nader in the 2000 Presidential election. Hansen joined 51 other family farmer and rural activists in forming 'Family Farmers’ National Alliance for Nader\LaDuke'.

From the 1930s to the 1980s, he was involved with most of the nation's major farm protest organizations, often taking leadership roles. He was a strong and consistent advocate of parity price indexing of agricultural commodities, and often encouraged family farmers to align themselves with other marginalized constituencies in American life. An oral history of Hansen's involvement in farm protest movements is available in Coming of Age: The Story of Our Century by Those Who’ve Lived It by Studs Terkel.

Hansen's files and records were donated to Iowa State University. The manuscript collection available at ISU in Ames includes his speeches and writings, the organizational archives of the many organizations he was involved with, and exchanges of letters with dozens of correspondents. Some of his records were also sent to the University of Nebraska–Lincoln, including most of his records relating to Nebraskans for Peace and the American Veterans Committee.

== Other sources ==
- Farm Bill Basics: Formula for Prosperity and Fairness (George Naylor, Jim Dubert, Bert Henningson, Jr. and Curt Stofferahn. Ames, Iowa)
