= Arthur Durston =

American painter

Arthur Henry Purcell Durston
- Born: March 30, 1889; England
- Died: December 27, 1938 (aged 49); Los Angeles, California, U.S.
- Known for: Painting

Arthur Henry Purcell Durston (1889–1938) was an American artist of British descent. Born in England, he immigrated to the U.S. in 1908, and was naturalized a U.S. citizen in 1918. He was known for his modernist paintings in oil and water.

== Early life, education, and military service ==
Arthur Durston was born to Sidney John Durston and Alice Henrietta Durston on March 30, 1889. His father was a coach builder residing in Farnborough, England (now part of the greater London area). He was educated in England, France, and San Francisco. He served in Company I, 31st U.S. Infantry from May 5, 1918, to December 21, 1919.

== Art career ==
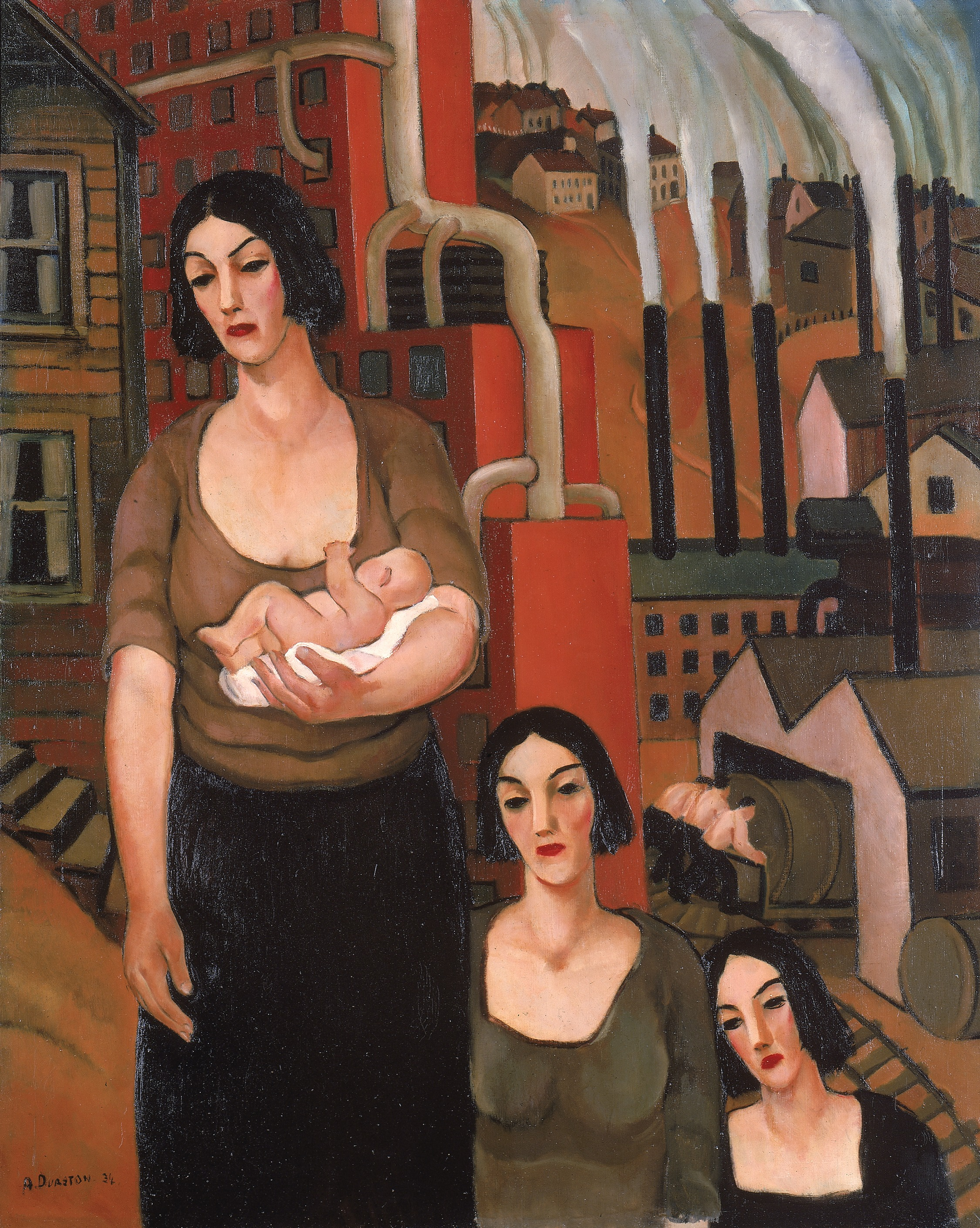
Industry, oil on canvas, 1934, in the collection of the Smithsonian American Art Museum

Durston's paintings were characterized as "somber" and "depressing." Much of his work was done in America during the 1930s; he worked under the Public Works of Art Project during the Great Depression, which provided him with a small income during that time.

His work is included in the collections of the Smithsonian American Art Museum and the National Gallery of Art, Washington.

Durston died on December 27, 1938, in Los Angeles, California.
