= Cities in the Great Depression =

Throughout the industrial world, cities were devastated during the Great Depression, beginning in 1929 and lasting through most of the 1930s. Worst hit were port cities (as world trade fell) and cities that depended on heavy industry, such as the steel and automotive industries. Service-oriented cities were hurt less severely. Political centers such as Washington, London and Berlin flourished during the Great Depression, as the expanded role of government added many new jobs.

== British Commonwealth and Empire ==
=== Great Britain ===
Although the impact of the Great Depression on Great Britain was less severe than elsewhere, the industrial cities of the Midlands, the North, and Scotland were very hard-hit.

Liverpool and Manchester, with years of high unemployment, had already acquired a reputation as highly depressed areas. City leaders fought back, and promoted a series of reforms and innovations in infrastructure that made them leaders in urban redevelopment. Such projects included the Wythenshawe Estate, the Mersey Tunnel and Manchester Central Library. Promoters strongly emphasized how the redevelopment projects presented new images of Liverpool and Manchester. One goal was to integrate newly enfranchised voters, a strategy also employed by the Conservative Party to engage with the mass electorate.

=== Canada ===
Canada's economy at the time was just starting to industrialize primary industries (agriculture, fishing, mining and logging) to manufacturing. Exports and prices of raw materials plunged, and employment, prices and profits fell in every sector. Canada was the worst-hit (after the United States) because of its economic position. It was further affected as its main trading partners were the U.S. and Britain.

The hardest-hit cities were the heavy industry centers of Southern Ontario. They included Hamilton (Canada's largest steel center), Toronto, Tilbury, and Windsor, an automotive manufacturing center linked to its larger neighbour, Detroit. In Ontario, unemployment skyrocketed to roughly 45%.

The Prairie Provinces and Western Canada were among the hardest-hit; they fully recovered after 1939. The fall of wheat prices drove many farmers to the towns and cities, such as Calgary, Alberta; Regina, Saskatchewan; and Brandon, Manitoba.

Women held 25–30% of the jobs in the cities. Few women were employed in heavy industry, railways or construction. Many were household workers or were employed in restaurants and family-owned shops. Women factory workers typically handled clothing and food. Educated women had a narrow range of jobs, such as clerical work and teaching. It was expected that a woman give up a good job when she married. Srigley emphasizes the wide range of background factors and family circumstances, arguing that "gender" itself was typically less important than race, ethnicity, or class.

=== Australia ===
During the Great Depression, different parts of Australian society experienced different hardships, challenges and opportunities. There was increased movement of many people to and from country areas in search of work. City and urban people planted gardens to produce fruit and vegetables. In some urban areas co-operatives were formed based on barter systems to share what was available. Shacks were built on the outskirts of large cities to house some who lost their homes.

=== Singapore ===
Singapore, at the time of British colony, was integrated into the world economy and suffered economic declines like other trading cities. However the people of Singapore were resilient in coping. Those who remained in the city used complex relationships among Chinese kinfolk; they shared food, housing, and clothing, and minimized the negative impacts. They spread work around, and provided an intelligence network to assist relatives in finding temporary employment. The safety valve of emigration to rural areas reduced the overall negative impact.

== Chile ==
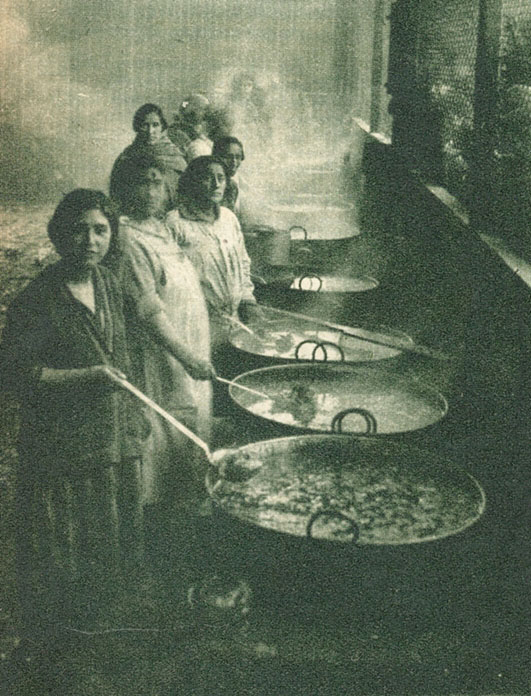
Soup kitchen in Santiago to feed the unemployed in 1932.

As saltpetre and copper exports collapsed levels of unemployment rose dramatically causing a migration of unemployed saltpetre miners from the north to Santiago. Miners constituted around 6% of the active population but made up more than half of the unemployed during the crisis. Numerous soup kitchens sprang up in Santiago while homeless people begun to dwell in caves in the hills around this city.

== France ==
By 1930 France remained a significantly rural society, with just a single city of over a million inhabitants (Paris), two more of over half a million (Lyon and Marseille), and fourteen more of over 100,000 inhabitants. The worldwide Great Depression had a moderate impact on the French economy, which proved resilient. Conditions worsened in 1931 bringing hardships and a more somber mood. Unemployment rose, and hours of work were cut; however the price of food sharply declined, offsetting some of the hardship. The population of Paris declined slightly from its all-time peak of 2.9 million in 1921 to 2.8 million in 1936, with city-dwellers opting to return to the countryside to ride out the economic crisis among family. The arrondissements in the center lost as much as twenty percent of their population, while the outer neighborhoods, gained ten percent. The low birth rate of Parisians was compensated by a new wave of immigration from Russia, Poland, Germany, eastern and central Europe, Italy, Portugal and Spain. Political tensions mounted in Paris with strikes, demonstrations and confrontations between the Communists and Front populaire on the extreme left and the Action Française on the extreme right.

== Germany ==
In Germany, the depression had reached its worst in 1932, with 6 million unemployed, spread throughout every city. From 1928 to 1932 unemployment in Berlin soared from 133,000 to 600,000. In Hamburg, a port city, the numbers went from 32,000 to 135,000. In Dortmund, in the Ruhr industrial region, it went from 12,000 to 65,000. Berlin verged on political chaos as Communist and Nazi paramilitary forces fought for control of the streets. Overall the Nazis were weakest in the largest cities, which were controlled by Socialist and Communist parties (and in Catholic areas, the Center party). After 1933, the Nazi government greatly expanded arms production, which reduced unemployment.

Berlin, and the other cultural centers, were especially hard-hit. The publicly subsidized city and state theaters that were the center of cultural life took heavy cuts. After 1933, the Nazis imposed a new, heavily subsidized cultural order that glorified Nazi ideals and ridiculed the artistic achievements of the Weimar era.

== Japan ==
In Japan, the hardest hit sector was urban commerce and services, which declined 23 percent in 1928–1933, followed by agriculture which declined 12 percent. However, manufacturing experienced positive growth in nearly every year. The 1920s economically were sluggish in Japan, and the financial crisis began earlier there, as a major banking panic occurred in 1927. Recovery was stimulated by heavy government spending, especially for the Army and Navy. Relief programs were focused on the politically important rural areas. Urban relief projects had low priority in the 1930s, since Tokyo had been heavily subsidized for rebuilding after the great 1923 earthquake. Osaka used its own funds to expand new housing into suburban areas in the 1930s.

== Soviet Union ==
The Soviet Union was largely cut off from world affairs, and during the 1930s was engaged in a very large scale maneuver to force peasants off the land and relocating them in industrial cities. Many factories, electrical plants, and transportation facilities were built along these lines. The most dramatic showpiece was the Moscow subway. The Moscow Metro opened in 1935 and immediately became the centerpiece of the transportation system. It became the prototype for future Soviet large-scale technologies. Lazar Kaganovich was in charge; he designed the subway so that citizens would absorb the values and ethos of Soviet civilization as they rode. The artwork of the 13 original stations became nationally and internationally famous. For example, the Sverdlov Square subway station featured porcelain bas-reliefs depicting the daily life of the Soviet peoples, and the bas-reliefs at the Dynamo Stadium sports complex glorified sports and the physical prowess of the powerful new "Homo Sovieticus." (Soviet man). The metro was touted as the symbol of the new social order—a sort of Communist cathedral of engineering modernity. Soviet workers did the labor and the art work, but the main engineering designs, routes, and construction plans were handled by specialists recruited from the London Underground. The Britons called for tunneling instead of the "cut-and-cover" technique, the use of escalators instead of lifts, and designed the routes and the rolling stock. The paranoia of Stalin and the NKVD was evident when the secret police arrested numerous British engineers for espionage—that is for gaining an in-depth knowledge of the city's physical layout. Engineers for the Metropolitan Vickers Electrical Company were given a show trial and deported in 1933, ending the role of British business in the USSR.

== United States ==
U.S. larger cities in the 1920s enjoyed strong growth. With the end of large-scale immigration, populations stabilized and the plentiful jobs in the cities pulled families upwards in terms of social mobility. Investment in office buildings, stores, factories, utilities, streets, and, especially, apartments and single-family homes, added substantially to the infrastructure, and contributed to the notion that better times lay ahead. However, after 1929, the optimism ebbed away, overwhelmed by a deepening pessimism that made long-term private investment seem inadvisable. The migration from rural areas to the cities, which had been strong in the 1920s, reversed itself as millions headed back to the family farm.

The Depression's damage to large cities, suburbs, towns and rural areas varied according to the economic base. Most serious in larger cities was the collapse of the construction industry with new starts falling to less than 10% of the norm of the late 1920s. Although much needed work was deferred, maintenance and repair of existing structures comprised over a third of the private sector construction budget in the 1930s. Devastating was the disappearance of 2 million high paying jobs in the construction trades, plus the loss of profits and rents that humbled many thousands of landlords and real estate investors.

Second came the general downturn in industry, especially heavy manufacturing. Steel in Pittsburgh, Pennsylvania, and Gary, Indiana, and automobiles in Detroit took the heaviest hits, along with railroads and coal mining. In these sectors, the largest cities suffered somewhat less than smaller mill towns, mining camps and railroad centers. Unemployment was a problem everywhere, but it was less severe among women than men, among workers in non-durable industries (such as food and clothing), in services and sales, and in government jobs. A sharp educational gradient meant that the less skilled inner city men had much higher unemployment rates than the high-school and college educated men who lived in outer zones and suburbs. Although suburbia stopped growing, it did not suffer nearly as much as the central cities.

While some unemployed came to the cities looking for relief, much larger numbers of unemployed returned to family farms. For the first time ever, the movement of native population was away from cities and toward rural America.

The fiscal soundness of city and county governments was challenged by the rise in relief expenditures and the sharp fall in tax collections. The Hoover Administration had encouraged state and local governments to expand public works projects, which they did in 1930 and 1931. While this expansion may have slowed the rise in unemployment, the spending was a luxury that could not be borne in the face of falling tax revenues and the unwillingness of investors to put more money into municipal bonds. After 1933, new sales taxes and infusions of federal money helped relieve the fiscal distress. Sharply depressed tax revenues meant that all city governments had to cut their budgets. Some of the revenue loss was replaced by the New Deal relief agencies. However, there was no direct federal aid to education, and public schools faced a hard decade, which in some states took decades to recover.

=== Relief ===
While local relief before 1932 focused on providing small sums of cash or baskets of food and coal for the neediest, the federal programs launched by the New Deal used massive construction projects with prevailing wages to ease the unemployment crisis. FERA and WPA hired the unemployed to build and repair the public infrastructure in dramatic fashion but did little to foster the recovery of the private sector. On the other hand PWA worked with local governments to identify needed improvements, then contracted with private construction companies to do the work.

A team of economists reports that each additional dollar spent on New Deal programs in a city had multiple long-term, positive results. With more New Deal relief spending came higher family incomes, less crime, higher birth rates, lower infant mortality, and lower death rates due to suicide and disease.

=== New Deal politics ===
Franklin Delano Roosevelt had a magnetic appeal to the city dwellers—he brought relief and recognition of their ethnic leaders and ward bosses, as well as labor unions. Taxpayers, small business and the middle class voted for Roosevelt in 1936 but turned sharply against him after the recession of 1937-38 seemed to belie his promises of recovery. Roosevelt's New Deal Coalition discovered an entirely new use for city machines in his three reelection campaigns of the New Deal and the World War II. Traditionally, local bosses minimized turnout so as to guarantee reliable control of their wards and legislative districts. To carry the electoral college, however, Roosevelt needed to carry the entire state, and thus needed massive majorities in the largest cities to overcome the hostility of suburbs and towns.

With Harry Hopkins his majordomo, Roosevelt used the WPA as a national political machine. Men on relief could get WPA jobs regardless of their politics, but hundreds of thousands of well-paid supervisory jobs were given to the local Democratic machines. The 3.5 million voters on relief payrolls during the 1936 election cast 82% of their ballots for Roosevelt. The vibrant labor unions, heavily based in the cities, likewise did their utmost for their benefactor, voting 80% for him, as did Irish, Italian and Jewish voters. In all, the nation's 106 cities over 100,000 population voted 70% for FDR in 1936, compared to his 59% elsewhere. Roosevelt won reelection in 1940 thanks to the cities. In the North, the cities over 100,000 gave Roosevelt 60% of their votes, while the rest of the North favored Willkie 52%-48%. It was just enough to provide the critical electoral college margin. With the start of full-scale war mobilization in the summer of 1940, the cities revived. The new war economy pumped massive investments into new factories and funded round-the-clock munitions production, guaranteeing a job to anyone who showed up at the factory gate.

=== Organized crime ===
The American mafia and other organized crime syndicates had flourished by selling illegal liquor during Prohibition in the 1920s. They lost their main market when prohibition ended in 1933. Public opinion turned much more hostile toward them. Organized crime was targeted by the FBI under J. Edgar Hoover. Aggressive prosecutors like Thomas E. Dewey became public heroes. This led to the capture or killing of many high-profile gangsters. Al Capone, a famous Chicagoan, was imprisoned for tax evasion in 1931. Lucky Luciano of New York City went to prison in 1936. Gambling, prostitution, and loansharking provided weak substitutes for illegal liquor.

=== Manila, Philippines ===
In the American colony of the Philippines, the Main political dispute over independence was settled by 1934 with the decision that the Philippines would become independent in 1946. The Great Depression was much less severe than in the United States, primarily because the sharp drop in the cost of food work to the benefit of the working class in the city. Washington provided much of the funding for a large middle-class bureaucracy and for major construction projects.
