= Michael S. Neiberg =

American historian

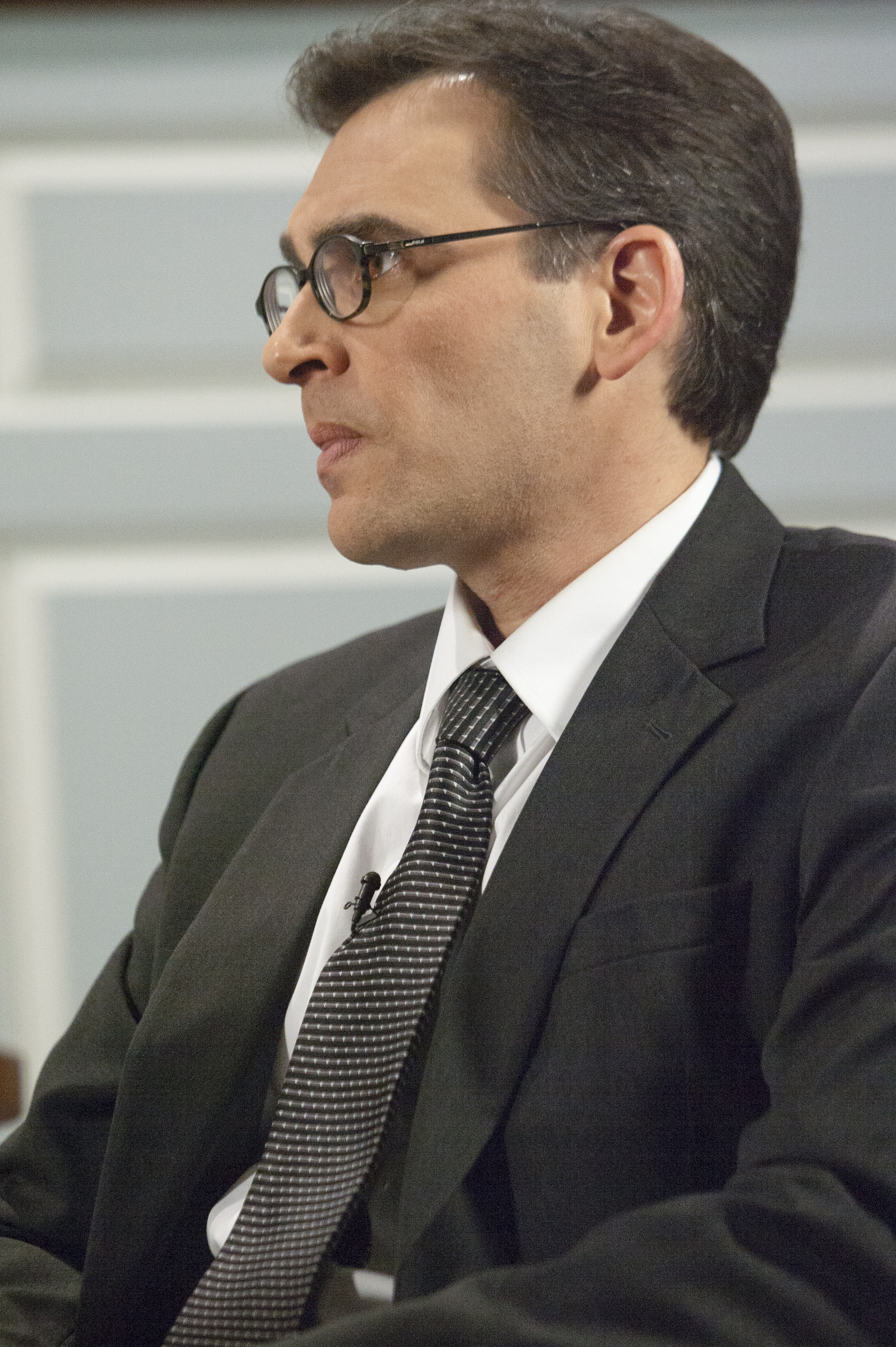
Michael S. Neiberg

Michael Scott Neiberg (born August 2, 1969) is an American historian who specializes in 20th-century military history, with a focus on France and, more broadly, Western Europe during the 1914–1945 era.

== Career ==
Michael Neiberg was born in Pittsburgh, Pennsylvania, the son of Laurence Neiberg, a teacher, and his wife Phyllis Dee (Saroff) Neiberg. He serves as the inaugural Chair of War Studies in the Department of National Security and Strategy at the United States Army War College. He is also a senior fellow in the Center for the Study of America and the West at the Foreign Policy Research Institute.

== Selected works ==
- Making Citizen-Soldiers: ROTC and the Ideology of American Military Service. Cambridge, MA: Harvard University Press, 2000. ISBN 0674543122 OCLC 42289811
- Foch: Supreme Allied Commander in the Great War. Washington, DC: Brassey's, 2003. ISBN 1574885510 OCLC 52509411
- Warfare & Society in Europe: 1898 to the Present. New York: Routledge, 2004. ISBN 0415327180 OCLC 52595148
- Warfare in World History. New York: Routledge, 2005. ISBN 0415229553 OCLC 974085421
- Fighting the Great War: A Global History. Cambridge, MA: Harvard University Press, 2005. ISBN 0674016963
- Fascism. Aldershot, England: Ashgate, 2006. ISBN 0754625745 OCLC 62282469
- The World War I Reader: [Primary and Secondary Sources]. New York: New York University Press, 2007. ISBN 0814758320 OCLC 70207983
- The Nineteenth Century. Westport, CT: Greenwood, 2007. ISBN 031333269X OCLC 72868077
- The Second Battle of the Marne. Bloomington: Indiana University Press, 2008. ISBN 9780253351463 OCLC 175289986
- The Western Front 1914-1916. London: Amber, 2008. ISBN 9781906626013 OCLC 234464924
- Dance of the Furies: Europe and the Outbreak of World War I. Cambridge, MA: Belknap Press of Harvard University Press, 2011. ISBN 9780674049543 OCLC 676725362
- The Blood of Free Men: The Liberation of Paris, 1944. New York: Basic Books, 2012. ISBN 9780465023998 OCLC 778420719
- The Military Atlas of World War I. New York: Chartwell Books, 2014. ISBN 078583110X OCLC 854890188
- Potsdam: The End of World War II and the Remaking of Europe. New York: Basic Books, 2015. ISBN 9780465075256 OCLC 891609325
- The Path to War: How the First World War Created Modern America. Oxford University Press, 2016. ISBN 9780190464967 OCLC 941875030
- The Treaty of Versailles: A Very Short Introduction. Oxford [UK]; New York: Oxford University Press, 2019. ISBN 9780190644987 OCLC 1047524628
- When France Fell: The Vichy Crisis and the Fate of the Anglo-American Alliance. Cambridge, MA: Harvard University Press, 2021. ISBN 978-0674258563 OCLC 1269427614
