= Second Thirty Years' War =

Periodization scheme encompassing European wars from 1914 to 1945

"Second Thirty Years' War" is a periodization scheme sometimes used to encompass the wars in Europe from 1914 to 1945. (Note: Use of this term can be found in many sources. Some examples include "Naming World Wars" at GlobalSecurity.org, Anthony Shaw's The World in Conflict, 1914–1945 (2000) ISBN 978-1-57958-212-8, and many other sources.) Just as the Thirty Years' War of 1618 to 1648 was not a single war but a series of conflicts in varied times and locations, later organized and named by historians into a single period, the Second Thirty Years' War has been seen as a "European Civil War", fought over the problem of Germany and exacerbated by the new ideologies of communism and fascism that came into power after World War I. The thesis of the Second Thirty Years' War is that World War I naturally led to World War II; in this framework, the latter is the inevitable result of the former, and thus they can be seen as a single conflict. Some historians have criticized this thesis on the grounds that it excuses the actions of fascist and Nazi historical actors.

== Origins ==
The concept of a "Second Thirty Years' War" originated in 1946 with the former head of French government Charles de Gaulle in his speech in Bar-le-Duc (28 July 1946) evoking "the drama of the Thirty Years War we just won". De Gaulle viewed the First World War and the Second World War as a single conflict, the interwar period being a mere truce. That was echoed, among others, by Sigmund Neumann in his book The Future in Perspective (1946). In 1948, British Prime Minister Winston Churchill gave the idea a boost when, in the first paragraph of the preface to The Gathering Storm (1948), he wrote that his books would "cover an account of another Thirty Years War". Major European conflicts during that period included the Balkan Wars (1912–1913), World War I (1914–1918), the Russian Civil War (1917–1923), the Ukrainian–Soviet War (1917–1921), the Polish–Soviet War (1919–1921), the Spanish Civil War (1936–1939) and World War II (1939–1945). In addition, the interwar period saw significant levels of civilian and labor conflict as well as colonial wars.

Though it is not "scholarly" in form, it is obviously based upon close acquaintance with the sources and keenly perceptive observation. Thus it is that rare combination of the scholarly study and readable synthesis that many strive for and few attain. In approaching his subject, Neumann regards the years since 1914 as another Thirty Years' War which has been accompanied at the same time by a revolution that is still going on. Likening World War I and the Versailles peace to a prologue, he interprets what followed as five acts of a Greek drama of approximately equal length: 1919–24, 1924–29, 1929–34, 1934–39 and 1939–45.

— Lee, D. W. (December 1946). "Review of Sigmund Neumann's The future in perspective"

== Criticism ==
The thesis has been challenged and rejected by many historians, who see it as too simple an explanation for the complex series of events that occurred during the interwar period of 1918 to 1939. In particular, some argue that, in describing the rise of the Nazis as an inevitable result of the Treaty of Versailles, the "Second Thirty Years' War" thesis excuses Nazi rhetoric as being a defensive reaction to supposed British and French vindictiveness. Rather, critics see World War II as a consequence of Hitler and the racist ideology of Nazism, and since Hitler's rise to power was contingent on the Great Depression, it cannot have been inevitable, nor can his support have been a direct reaction to Versailles. The Second Thirty Years' War thesis is part of the larger debates over the causes of World War II and over the idea of a European Civil War.

== Arguments against the Second Thirty Years War thesis ==
Churchill's The Second World War, published from 1948, said that the war was simply the completion of a second Thirty Years War, while books by A. J. P. Taylor and Fritz Fischer in the 1960s blamed the German people and saw Hitler's plans as a continuation of the German foreign Policy of Bismarck and Wilhelm II. Churchill (Bell, p. 14) claimed that WWII was simply part two of a thirty years war, echoing Foch's remark that Versailles was "an armistice for twenty years." However, Henig shows Hitler's foreign policy differed from the past in four distinctive areas. Firstly, as Hilder said, German Eastward expansionism pre-1919 was to preserve the status quo, not for racial genocide. Secondly Hitler, as stated in Mein Kampf and reiterated in 1933, rejected Wilhelmine colonial and trade policies. Thirdly Hitler, unlike Bismarck, intended to destroy Russia, and fourthly, he intended to destroy the international system itself which Stressman had used for revision. All four differences are integral parts of Hitler's long-term plans. Bell agrees that the new elements are more important than the continuity arguments, adding that German political and military leaders in the 1930s did not want a war of conquest. This helps dispel at second theory, namely Taylor's and Fischer's ideas that the German people themselves were to blame. In 1936, the Reichstag cheered Hitler's peace proposals, and Broszat believes that the German people wanted simply peaceful revision. Hitler also agreed to Munich, at least in part, because he saw the complete lack of enthusiasm for war in Germany. Rich agrees that Hitler was a completely unique, or abnormal, phenomenon, ultimately expressed in his genocide, as previous Germans rulers of Poland never pursued extermination.

=== Hitler's long-term Stufenplan ===
However, Henig claims there is now general agreement amongst historians that the chief responsibility for unleashing war in Europe, in 1939, rests on Hitler and the Nazis. However Watt, Bracher and Broszat deny Hitler had a long-term programme, and Roberts believes that his diplomacy was based on technique, not content. However, Rowse, Bullock, Trevor-Roper and Weinberg all agree that Hitler had consistent long-term plans but a flexible method. As Bell says, what appeared to be two diametrically opposed views – improvisation and plans – have become the new orthodoxy.

Hillgruber believes Hitler had carefully premeditated Stufenplan (step-by-step) for Lebensraum, while Hildebrand claims he intended intercontinental conquest afterwards. In Mein Kampf Hitler talks of giving up the old colonial and trade policies of Wilhelmine Germany and looking instead to Lebensraum in Russia and her vassal border states, reiterated in his first speech to army commanders in February 1933. Noakes and Pridham believe that taking Mein Kampf and the Zweites Buch together, Hitler had a five stage plan; rearmament and Rhineland remilitarisation, Austria, Czech, and Poland to become German satellites, defeat France or neutralise her through a British alliance, Lebensraum in Russia and finally world domination. In November 1939, Hitler claimed his actions since 1933 had been based upon his plans since 1919. Withdrawal from the League of Nations, rearmament and the annexation of Bohemia had been planned, while the decision to attack Poland first, and then Russia once the West had been dealt with had been determined by the current situation. As Eberhard Jäckel asserted: "Perhaps never in history did a ruler write down before he came to power what he was to do afterwards as precisely as did Adolf Hitler".

Indeed, Hitler continually spoke privately of his plans for war. In August 1939, Hitler had stated that his actions were all directed against Russia, and if the west refused to see this, then he would have to attack them first. In February 1939, he claimed all his actions since 1933 were part of pre-existing, long-made plans, and in May that Danzig was not the issue, instead Lebensraum in the East to provide food and materials during the war with the West. As Goda says, all these speeches contain foreign policy statements that are consistent with each other in both the short and the long term. Rich agrees that there is an uncanny consistency between his statements and actions. Hitler was convinced of his historic mission to lead Germany in a war of conquest and said that he would built up his army to use it.

=== The case against Versailles as cause ===
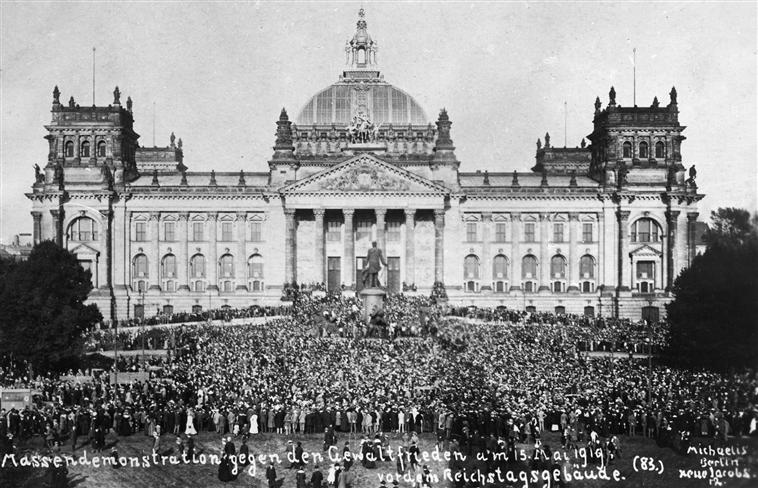
Demonstration against the Treaty in front of the Reichstag.

The idea that the imbalance caused by the Treaty of Versailles was responsible is the basis of the argument for the Second Thirty Years War thesis. Hitler formulated his plans in response to Versailles, and he openly expressed how he intended to exploit the situation to further his long-term plans, so they cannot be considered separately. However, as Bell says, the Treaty created profound problems, but they were not insoluble and would not necessarily lead to war. Austen Chamberlain claimed the Treaty of Locarno (1925), freely negotiated and accepted by Germany, marked the end of the war chapter. In 1926, France, Germany, and the Low Countries negotiated an iron and steel cartel, which could have eventually led to a proto-E. E. C. Britain and, less enthusiastically, France would have accepted peaceful revision of Versailles. The Wall Street crash led to the collapse of goodwill, playing an indirect and intangible part in the war's outbreak, but while this may have been a necessary condition for Hitler's rise to power, it becomes a mere condition in the war's outbreak as economic crises are normal in a global capitalist system. Bell says three factors caused the war; German expansionism, the initial toleration of the west, and their eventual determination to fight. The first is Hitler's plans, the second is because the west was prepared for peaceful revision, and the third is because they realised that Hitler planned far more than that. It is therefore Hitler's plans, not Versailles that caused the war. As Baumont said, the war’s outbreak is simply down to Hitler's insatiable appetite – his long-term plans, in effect.

=== Appeasement and revision ===
This would only hold true if either Hitler had been concerned solely with revision of the treaty and nothing more, or if his appeasement had caused the war. However, Halifax had told Hitler in November 1937 that Britain supported legitimate revision and in 1938 British public opinion would not accept a war to stop national self-determination. Military weakness was also a factor. The General Staff feared defeat given so many potential enemies in 1937, the Dominions desired peace in 1938, Britain lacked reliable allies and Neville Chamberlain believed German airpower would destroy Britain in a matter of weeks, though they overestimated both the number of German bombers and their range. The public marginally supported the Munich settlement and Chamberlain received many thank you letters, but the main point is that it was only when Hitler's action went beyond legitimate grievances that the democracies could morally contemplate war. Chamberlain claimed appeasement represented the only chance of preventing war in Europe and it was his duty to try, especially given Imperial commitments, economic constraints and vulnerability to air attack. However, Dray explains that normal behaviour is simply a mere, non-causal condition in the face of an abnormal factor. He believes the evidence shows appeasement was normal, while Hitler's plans, which went far beyond a simple revision of the Versailles settlemet and which prepared for a full-scale European war, were not.

=== The move beyond legitimate Versailles grievances, 1938–1939 ===
Watt said "neither firmness nor appeasement, nor arms, nor demonstrations of determination" could stop him implementing his plans. McDonough believes that Chamberlain took too long in finding out whether Hitler wanted revision or European domination, but the problem was finding out where legitimate demands ended and the unacceptable began. As Chamberlain claimed, the Prague annexation was a "completely different category", and he only now wondered if it was a step to dominate the world by force. In November 1938, Hitler admitted that it was only by talking of peace that he was able to buy time for rearmament so the subsequent steps (of his plans) could be pursued. Having been welcomed by cheering crowds in Austria, Prague was the first time he had unilaterally invaded anywhere. In the Hossbach Memorandum, Hitler claimed his plan was to fight the west if they opposed his Lebensraum, and this is what happened in 1939. Chamberlain explained in March 1938 that due to geography Britain could not help Czechoslovakia and that it would simply be a pretext for war with Germany. This is obviously equally true of Poland, so in effect Chamberlain admits that the Polish guarantee was nothing but a pretext for war now Hitler's true intentions are known. Likewise, Hitler told his generals that lebensraum, not Danzig, was the reason for the Polish crisis, and Greenwood shows that he did not state his terms as he wanted to avoid unwelcome conciliation, Ribbentrop telling Ciano in August that Germany would fight even if they were offered more than was asked for. As G. P. Gooch said:

The revelation of Hitler's Napoleonic ambition, quickly followed by demands incompatible with Polish independence, places the guilt for the new conflagration squarely on his shoulders

As such, the war may not be seen simply as a fight to reverse the First World War settlement, as Hitler's pronouncements from Mein Kampf onwards had made clear. For the Thirty Years War theory to hold true, Hitler would have had to be aiming for a restoration of the 1914 frontiers, but in Mein Kampf he rejects this as "inadequate". Gordon Craig likewise believes this 'discontinuity theory' disproves the concept of the Thirty Years War, as

Hitler was sui generis, a force without a real historical past ... (making) it impossible to compare him with any other German leader.

and the idea that World War I would have led to World War II had it not been for Hitler may be discounted.

=== The abnormality of Hitler's plans as unique event and sole cause ===
Hitler's long-term plans conditionally willed the war, and his foreign and economic policies in power had all led in this direction. Hudson claims that Hitler was determined to go through with the attack on Poland whether he deterred the Western powers or not and Reynolds believes that his actions were such that any sane man would expect to lead to war. This was a calculated risk, not a miscalculation or blunder. Appeasement, however, was a miscalculation, based on ignorance of his long-term plans, exemplified by Chamberlain's belief until Munich that Hitler could still be appeased by colonial concessions and it was normal for Chamberlain to work for peace until the last moment, given the horrors of WWI and the fear of the bomber. Likewise, when Cowling criticises Chamberlain for caring more about domestic policy, national self interest and the Conservative Party's electoral fortunes, this is normal behaviour for a democratic leader, a sentiment echoed by Schmidt. Trevor-Roper believes that a normal German nationalist would have been happy with the 1914 borders, and that no other leader would attempt genocide for Lebensraum, which challenges Taylor's and Fischer's beliefs. Dray believes that normality is crucial to causation. He cites the example of a drain flooding due to a storm – it is the abnormal conditions, the flood, that caused the failure. Hitler's plans threw a spanner in the works of the international system. Had the international system broken down due to the normal problems, such as national rivalry or economic collapse, then we could say that war was caused by the system's failure, but it had worked perfectly acceptably until Hitler's rise to power. This is the abnormality, and thus the sole cause of the war. Dray says that what is normal is a value judgement on the part of the historian. However, most would agree that acting within the confines of limited knowledge in search of the most likely peaceful and beneficial, long-term prospects for one's country is normal in political leaders. Gambling everything on a war of genocide is not.

The necessary conditions leading to the war started in 1939 cannot be individually weighted counter-factually in a multi-causal world, and Dray believes these are mere background conditions while Hitler's long-term plans, which made war inevitable, are the sole cause. Versailles created an imbalance in the international system, but this was insignificant compared to Hitler's actions. As shown, Hinsey is right that the other powers could not justify resisting Hitler up to, and including, Munich, but had to resist if he went further. As Hitler continued exploiting the imbalance for his own ends, it is Hitler's long-planned exploitation, not the imbalance itself, that caused the war. Dray believes normality is the criterion that makes Hitler's actions post-Munich go from non-causal to causal status. While Hitler's earlier demands were seen as legitimate grievances, his long-planned post-Munich demands were excessive and were therefore abnormal. Had war had broken out up to and including Munich, then, Hinsey believes, Hitler would not be the cause. Dray points out that whether this would have been instead the imbalance or the actions of other individuals is an unknowable counter-factual. But after Munich, Hitler alone becomes the cause, and therefore the Thirty Years War thesis may be considered invalid.

Appeasement when long-term peace is still a possibility, however remote, is normal, as is resistance once national existence is threatened. Locarno shows the international system was working normally, though it could not cope with Hitler's planned war of Lebensraum in the East, which as admitted in Mein Kampf, necessitated defeating France first. German support for peaceful revision in 1936 and reluctance for war in 1938 is also normal behaviour, while Hitler's early plans that Germany acquire lebensraum or cease to exist are not. The reactions of his opponents forced him to telescope his economic and military plans, but his long-term plans allowed flexibility in exploiting favourable conditions. Hitler's plans to gamble everything on victory or defeat, on "to be or not to be" were sufficient to cause war. Political, military and economic constraints coupled with ignorance of his plans meant appeasement was normal until Munich, a rational strategy and normal continuation of British diplomatic traditions, while the realisation of his planned intentions meant resistance was normal in 1939. Hitler planned to use peace offers as cover in his step-by-step plan, and planned not to attack Czechoslovakia in 1938 without an excuse, denied him by Munich. As flexibility and opportunism were part of his plans, peace until 1938 may be attributed in part to Hitler's long-term plans, and in part to the non-causal, normal behaviour of appeasers acting in ignorance of his plans. As such, the Thirty Year War thesis is disputed by Dray and Hinsey, along with Henig, Bell, Rich, Hildebrand, Hillgruber, and Baumont, amongst others. Hitler's plans may have been formulated in response to Versailles but they went far beyond simple revision. He was simply, like any politician, working within the contemporary situation, and there is absolutely no reason why the outcome of the First World War should have led to a person with the aims of Hitler gaining power in Germany. As Bell shows, it was not World War I that caused World War II, "the depression bought Hitler, and Hitler bought the war."

== See also ==
- European Civil War (another term for the period)
- Long War (20th century)
- Der europäische Bürgerkrieg 1917–1945
- World war
- Political history of the world
- Short 20th century (a period extended by the Cold War)
