= Robert Boyce (historian) =

Canadian academic

Robert William Dewar Boyce (born 1943, in Montreal) is a professional historian and was (until his retirement) a senior lecturer in International History at the London School of Economics and Political Science (LSE). His main fields of interest are French external relations in the twentieth century, the role of economics, business and banking in modern international relations, Canadian external relations since 1900, and the modern history of international communications.

Boyce earned his BA from Wilfrid Laurier University, his MA from the Institute of United States Studies, and his PhD from the London School of Economics. After completing his PhD, he was a research associate at the LSE Centre for International Studies before joining the Department of International History as a lecturer in 1977. He has been a visiting professor at the University of Toronto and the University of Paris IV: Paris-Sorbonne.

He has made a significant number of publications in academic journals and has also edited and translated several books. He also lectures in the controversial subject of the European Civil War.

== Publications ==
=== Books ===
- editor. The Communications Revolution at Work: The Social, Economic and Political Impacts of Technological Change, Montreal and Kingston: McGill-Queen's University Press, 1999
- editor and translator. French Foreign and Defence Policy, 1918–1940: The Decline and Fall of a Great Power, London: Routledge, 1998
- co-editor. The Origins of World War Two: The Debate Continues, London: Palgrave Macmillan, 2003
- editor. The Great Interwar Crisis and the Collapse of Globalization, Palgrave Macmillan, April 2012

=== Journals/Articles ===
- 'Imperial Dreams and National Realities: Britain, Canada and the Struggle for a Pacific Telegraph Cable, 1879-1902', The English Historical Review, Vol.CXV, No.460 (January 2000), pp. 39–70
- 'Canada and the Pacific Cable Controversy, 1923-1928: Forgotten Source of Imperial Alienation', Journal of Imperial and Commonwealth History, Vol.26, No.1 (January, 1998), pp. 72–92

=== Chapters in edited collections ===
- 'Wall Street and the Spectre of the "Money Power" in Small-town America before and after the Crash of 1929', in Philippe Romanski (ed), Etats de New York, Rouen: Publications de l'Université de Rouen, 2000, pp. 19–31
- 'Historical Analysis and Fallacies in Interpreting Historical Data', in Martin W. Bauer and George Gaskell (eds), Qualitative Researching with Text, Image and Sound: A Practical Handbook, London: Sage Publications, 2000, pp. 318–35
- 'American or Anglo-Saxon Challenge for Europe in the 1920s?', Marchands, banquiers et hommes d'affaires dans l'espace européen, Actes des conférences et séminaires de la Chaire Glaverbel de Sociétés et Civilisations européennes, Louvain-la-Neuve: Institut d'études européennes, UCL, 1999, pp. 79–102
- 'The British Drinks Trade and Britain's Accession to the EEC, 1957-1970', in Eric Bussière et Michel Dumoulin, Milieux économiques et Intégration européenne en Europe occidentale au XXe siècle, Arras: Artois Presses Université, 1998, pp. 149–59
- 'The Briand Plan and the Crisis of British Liberalism', in Antoine Fleury (ed), Le Plan Briand d'Union fédérale européenne, Berne: Peter Lang, 1998, pp. 121–44
- '1940 as End and Beginning in French Inter-War History and Historiography', in R. Boyce (ed), French Foreign and Defence Policy, 1918–1940, London: Routledge, 1998, pp. 1–9
- 'Business as Usual: The Limits of French Economic Diplomacy, 1926-1933', in R. Boyce (ed), French Foreign and Defence Policy, 1918–1940, London: Routledge, 1998, pp. 107–31
- 'Britain's Changing Corporate Structure and the Crisis of Central Bank Control in the 1920s, in Philip Cottrell and Alice Teichova (eds), Finance in the Age of the Corporate Economy, Aldershot Hants: Ashgate Publishing, 1997, pp. 142–63
- 'Economics and the Crisis of British Foreign Policy Management, 1914-45', in D. Richardson and G. Stone (eds), Decisions and Diplomacy: Essays in Twentieth-Century International History London: Routledge, 1995, pp. 9–41
- 'The Origins of French Support for European Monetary Union', in D. Currie and J. Whitley (eds), EMU after Maastricht: Transition of Revaluation?, London: Lothian Foundation Press, 1995, pp. 69–86
- 'Submarine Cables as a Factor in Britain's Ascendancy as a World Power, 1850-1914', in M. North (ed) Kommunikationsrevolutionen: Die neuen Medien des 16. und 19. Jahrhunderts, Köln: Böhlau Verlag, 1995, pp. 81–100
