= European Civil War =

Concept describing 19th and 20th century conflicts in Europe as one continuous civil war

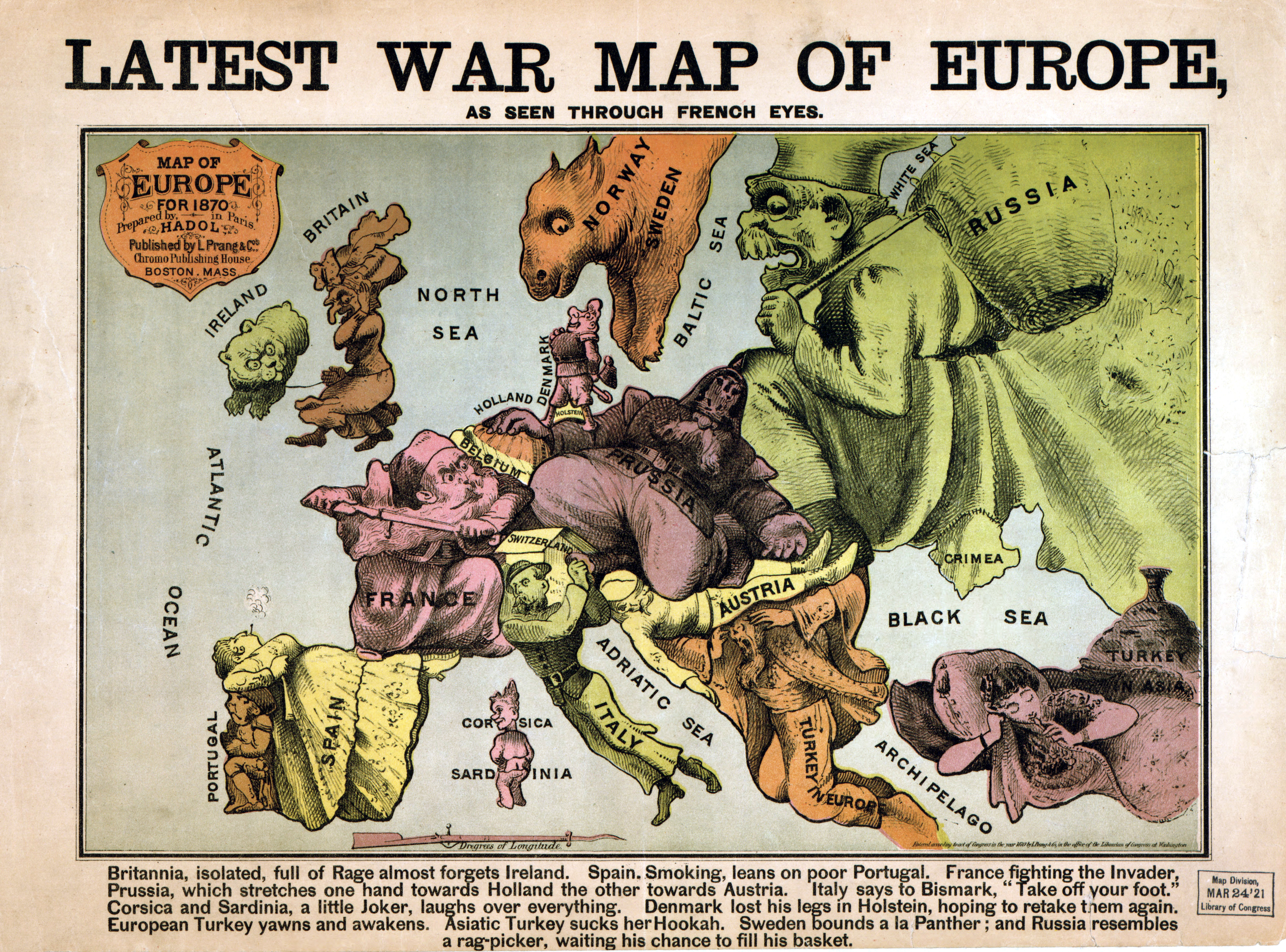
A French satirical cartoon map of Europe in 1870

The European Civil War is a concept meant to characterize a series of 19th- and early 20th-century conflicts in Europe as segments of an overarching civil war within a supposed European society. The timeframes associated with this European Civil War vary among historians. Some descriptions range from 1914 to 1945, thus including World War I, World War II, and many lesser conflicts of the interwar period. Others argue that this period started in 1870 with the Franco-Prussian War, or in 1905. Sometimes, the notion also serves to explain the process of European integration, and the creation of the European Union as a peaceful solution to this conflict.

Arguments in favor of this description usually point towards the relative cultural homogeneity of the European continent, to the family relation of European monarchs at the beginning of World War I, or to the continuity of armed conflicts in Europe between the various time frames. Arguments against the notion point towards the strong distinctions in religions and political systems that existed between European nations at the beginning of the period which undermine the idea that Europe formed a united "civil society". Others stress the global, i.e. not strictly European, nature of both world wars, which the characterization sometimes fails to account for. Consensus among historians does not support the notion of a European Civil War.

== Comparative application of the European Civil War concept ==
The concept of a European Civil War attempts to characterize World War I and World War II, along with the inter-war period and its conflicts, as a protracted civil war taking place in Europe. It is used in referring to the repeated confrontations that occurred during the first half of the 20th century. Unlike traditional approaches to history, this construct re-interprets the past in the light of a present reality (a semi-unified Europe), rather than interpreting past events in the light of the past. On the other hand, pre-Reformation European societies acknowledged a communal religious bond which lasted in many other ways including the intertwined dynasties of the various European royal houses.

The term does not easily encompass aspects of several conflicts in the period of its presumed application. No consensus has emerged over many details and links, such as the Spanish Civil War (1936–1939), the Russian Revolution and Russian Civil War (1917–1923). There is no consensus on its application to related conflicts within or between proximate European colonies in North Africa and in the Middle East. There is no consensus on its application to related conflicts outside the fringes of Europe such as the Japanese invasion of China and campaigns in the Pacific theater and Southeast Asia theater of World War II. The role of the United States in these events is also difficult to explain within the construct. Thus, the concept of a European Civil War is difficult to reconcile with the involvement of numerous sovereign non-colonial combatants in the conflicts in Europe from continents other than Europe, including South America (Brazil) and the Pacific (Thailand).

In comparison with traditional historical analysis of 20th-century European conflicts, the utility of the "civil war" concept has not been demonstrated. As of 2017, the construct of a continental European "civil war" in the period has not yet completely explained the geographic coverage, the multiple causes of the subsets of conflicts within the historical period and geographical range of operations and effects. At least two historically understood national" civil wars", the Russian Civil War and the Spanish Civil War, are among some of the internally conflicting arguments of the thesis. K. M. Panikkar's original range from 1914 to 1945 is among the chronological ranges proposed, but it does not explain some of these problems, such as the ideological content of both the nationalist and communist movements, the decline or elimination of related monarchies and the rise of national and transnational social democratic organizations (political parties and trade-union movements) in the period.

The period of events between 1936 and 1945, beginning with the conflict in Spain and ending with the European portion of World War II, are commonly cited. The University of Massachusetts Boston argues 1945 as the end-date, but the beginning of the conflict in 1917 with the Russian Civil War. However, for the self-mutilation perspective there is a tendency to stretch the beginning to as early as the start of the Franco-Prussian War on 19 July 1870 and the end to as late as the reunification of Germany of 1990. The London School of Economics course "European Civil War: 1890 to 1990" argues that 1945 was the end date and that the second half of the 20th century was the result of the conflagration's aftermath. The University of Hong Kong's Department of History proposes dividing the content into two sections, with one covering 1914-1945 and the second 1945 onwards.

== Supporting case ==
Those supporting the idea of a European Civil War contend that the heads of state in many European nations were so closely related as to constitute branches of the same family. European culture is also relatively homogeneous, with most nations tracing the roots of their culture to two principal sources, namely Christianity and classical antiquity. While separate, their respective legal systems were remarkably similar and evolved to become more so over time.

At the end of the conflict, elites in the different countries of Europe began work to create a community of nations that has since grown into the European Union. The emergence of the European Union from World War II is central to the argument as a civil war typically occurs when competing parties within the same country or empire struggle for national control of state power. Civil wars usually result in the emergence of a new or restrengthened central authority.

As mentioned below, some academics regard the First and Second World Wars as part of the same conflict with a 22-year cease-fire. The theory defines the Spanish and Russian civil wars as intermediate conflicts and links the roots of World War I back to the earlier Franco-Prussian conflict, regarding political changes in Italy, Portugal and elsewhere in a single context.

The central proponents of the European Civil War were originally based at the history department of the London School of Economics. In his 1996 work The Republic Besieged: Civil War in Spain 1936–1939, Paul Preston describes the Spanish Civil War as an "episode in a greater European Civil War that ended in 1945". The department even included the subject as a course in its own right (taught by Dr. Robert Boyce). However, their position has since gained ground with academics elsewhere.

Others who have used the notion of a European Civil War in their work include professor emeritus of Sociology at the University of Rome, University of California, Berkeley's Anthony Adamthwaite and Duke University's J. M. Roberts. In his 1996 work A History of Europe, Roberts stated that the "European Civil War ended the dominance of Europe in the world", a typical claim of the idea's proponents.

An early reference to this concept occurs during the 1970s television series The World at War, when historian Stephen Ambrose comments that 1945 witnessed an invasion of an exhausted Europe by Russian and American armies, "thus ensuring that no European nation actually wins the European Civil War". Earlier still were comments by Indian diplomat K. M. Panikkar in his 1955 book Asia and Western Dominance 1498-1945.

== See also ==
- Der europäische Bürgerkrieg 1917–1945
- Long War (20th century)
- Postwar: A History of Europe Since 1945
- Second Thirty Years War (another term for the period)
- Political history of the world
- Short 20th century (a period extended by the Cold War)
