= Richard Korherr =

Economist from Germany (1903–1989)

- Korherr in 1978
- Born: 30 October 1903; Regensburg, German Empire
- Died: 24 November 1989 (aged 86); Braunschweig, West Germany
- Occupation: Statistician
- Known for: The Korherr Report

Dr. Richard Korherr (30 October 1903 – 24 November 1989) was a professional statistician in Nazi Germany, and chief inspector of the statistical bureau of the SS during World War II. Korherr eventually held the rank of SS-Sturmbannführer.

Korherr received his doctorate in 1926 and worked for the Reich Statistical Office before Hitler's rise to power. He served as chairman of the Bavarian anti-separatist Reich und Heimat Committee in 1930–1933, and became member of the Catholic Bavarian People's Party. On 1 January 1934 his department was taken over by the Bavarian Statistical Office, and he was transferred there. In 1935–1940 Korherr was Director of the Statistical Office of the city of Würzburg. Following the invasion of Poland at the onset of World War II, on 9 December 1940 Himmler brought Korherr to Reichsführer-SS office, to study the progress of resettlement for him. Korherr's incredible problems with the SS began only when the German advance on the Russian front had been halted, resulting in the most damning statistic often attributed to him.

== Korherr Report ==
During World War II Korherr was commissioned by Heinrich Himmler to calculate the number of Jews in Europe subject to "special treatment" (Sonderbehandlung, an SS code name for mass murder) from 1937 to December 1942. Korherr completed his Korherr Report in January 1943 and handed it over to SS-Obersturmbannfuhrer Dr. Rudolf Brandt on the 23 March of that year. It was a 16-page document on the progress of the Holocaust as reflected in the dwindling numbers of Jews in Germany and German-occupied Europe. It included a seven-page supplement about the deportations in the first three months of 1943. The report was released under the title Die Endlösung der Judenfrage (English: the Final Solution to the Jewish Question). Korherr calculated that the number had fallen by 4 million, of whom 1,274,166 victims were delivered to camps for 'special treatment'. The exacting number of 1,274,166 Jews appeared in the Telegram sent by SS-Sturmbannführer Hermann Höfle on 11 January 1943 suggesting that both of them used data collected by the German Transport Authority. Himmler returned the document to its author and demanded a more innocuous word in place of the Sonderbehandlung to divert and obscure the crimes. Korherr replaced the phrase with Durchgeschleust suggesting that the quoted numbers of Jews had "passed through" the so-called Durchgangslager (transit camps). A summary of his report was delivered to Adolf Hitler by Brandt.

In 1945–1946 he was under so-called 'automatic arrest' as state functionary, however he did not face the Nuremberg Trials, because his Report was not revealed and he later claimed he never heard about the extermination before 1945.

Later Korherr worked at the Federal Ministry of Finance in West Germany. He also lectured at the University of Erlangen-Nuremberg in 1959–1962. Korherr died in the city of Braunschweig, Lower Saxony, on 24 November 1989 at the age of 86.
