= Höfle telegram =

Communique detailing Holocaust deaths during 1942

Höfle Telegram
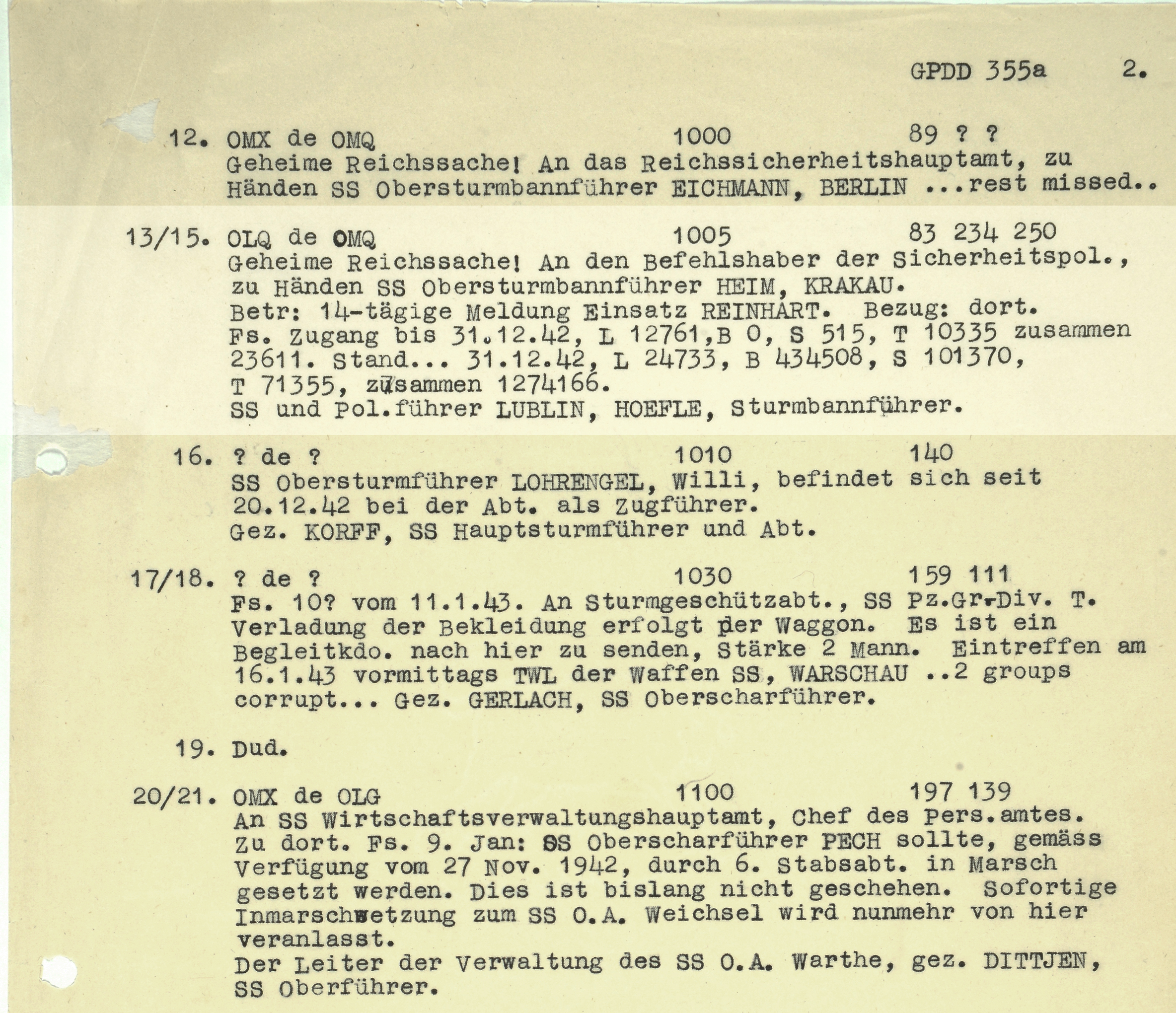
- The Höfle Telegram in the British archives
- Created: 11 January 1943; 83 years ago
- Location: British National Archives
- Commissioned by: Schutzstaffel
- Author: Hermann Höfle
- Media type: Telegram
- Subject: Statistics regarding Operation Reinhard
- Purpose: Reporting on the Holocaust

The Höfle telegram (also rendered as Hoefle telegram) is a one-page document containing detailed statistics on the murder of Jews at the Operation Reinhard extermination camps of Belzec, Sobibor, and Treblinka, and the concentration camp of Lublin-Majdanek in 1942.

The document includes two messages sent by SS-Sturmbannführer Hermann Höfle on 11 January 1943: one to SS-Obersturmbannführer Adolf Eichmann in Berlin and the other to SS-Obersturmbannführer Franz Heim in German-occupied Kraków. The telegram to Heim enumerates the number of "arrivals" at the extermination camps in the prior fortnight, as well as the cumulative "arrivals" through 31 December 1942. The term "arrivals" was a euphemism for being killed, as almost all of those who arrived at the Operation Reinhard camps were murdered.

Although the telegram was decrypted by the British Government Code and Cypher School at the time, its significance was not realised, and it was stored in the classified archives of the Public Record Office. It was declassified in 1997, and its importance was first recognised by Holocaust researchers in 2001. The telegram is a valuable primary source, as it contains previously unavailable figures for the number of Jews murdered at each Operation Reinhard camp during 1942, while its cumulative total corroborates the Korherr Report.

== Background ==
=== Operation Reinhard ===
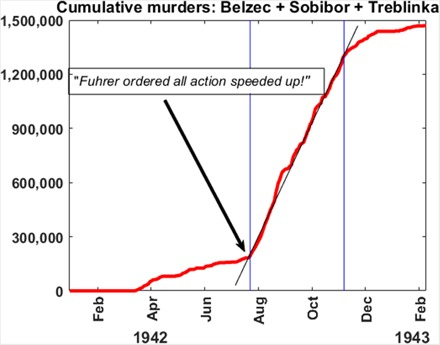
Cumulative murders at Belzec, Sobibor, and Treblinka from January 1942 to February 1943

Precisely when the genocide of the Jews became Nazi policy is not clear, but in July 1941 Reichsmarschall Hermann Göring signed an order to Reinhard Heydrich of the Reich Security Main Office, authorising the Final Solution of the Jewish Question, and from the beginning of Operation Barbarossa, the German invasion of the Soviet Union, the Einsatzgruppen and German Police and SS units began shooting Jews en masse.

SS-Gruppenführer Odilo Globočnik was probably ordered to start building extermination camps for Jews during an October 1941 meeting with Heinrich Himmler at his headquarters in East Prussia. Soon afterwards, Globočnik oversaw the construction of three camps: Belzec, Sobibor, and Treblinka. Belzec was built in November 1941, with Sobibor and Treblinka completed in spring 1942.

At the Wannsee Conference in January 1942, Reinhard Heydrich informed parts of the German government of the plan for the systematic murder of all European Jews. Five months later, Heydrich was assassinated. Soon afterwards, the plan to murder the Jews in the General Government district of German-occupied Poland was given the name "Einsatz Reinhardt" or "Aktion Reinhardt", commonly translated as Operation Reinhard, probably after Heydrich.

The three extermination camps began operating in 1942: first Belzec in March, then Sobibor in May and Treblinka in July. With all the camps operational, Himmler ordered that the destruction of the entire Jewish population of the General Government should be completed by the end of the year. Over the next 100 days, August to October 1942, over a million Jews were murdered in the three camps in a process with the characteristics of an assembly line.

The camp at Majdanek, which had been established in late 1941 as a prisoner-of-war camp and as a concentration camp, also functioned as an extermination camp during Operation Reinhard, with the gas chambers there becoming operational in September 1942.

=== Hermann Höfle ===
Hermann Höfle was a native of Salzburg with a poor school record and "terrible spelling" (likely dyslexia). He joined the Austrian SS in 1933. His participation in Kristallnacht brought him to the attention of fellow Austrian SS officer Adolf Eichmann, after which he joined the SS-Totenkopfverbände, the branch of the SS responsible for the concentration camps. Höfle took part in the persecution of Poles and Jews in the Nowy Sącz area after the outbreak of World War II. He was then assigned to Lublin.

In Lublin, as chief of staff to Globočnik, Hermann Höfle was responsible for supervising construction work at the extermination camps, coordinating the removal of Jews from ghettos, dispatching trains to the extermination camps, and distributing the property of the murdered Jews.

== Transmission, deciphering, and declassification ==
The Schutzstaffel (SS), which administered the concentration and extermination camps, had its own radio network, which it used to coordinate its actions in Eastern Europe. In order to maintain security, signals on this network were enciphered using the SS's own version of the Enigma machine.

On the morning of 11 January 1943, Höfle sent two telegrams from Lublin, both encrypted using the Enigma machine. It is likely that the two telegrams contained the same information.

The first telegram was transmitted by Höfle to Adolf Eichmann, the head of Reich Security Main Office Referat IV B4, the department responsible for the deportation of Jews to concentration and extermination camps. The second was sent to Franz Heim, deputy to the commander of the Security Police and the SD for the General Government Eberhard Schöngarth, in German-occupied Kraków. The reference on the telegram indicates that Höfle was supplying the figures after Heim requested them.

=== Interception and decryption ===
Unknown to the SS, their transmissions were being intercepted by the British Army Y service station at Beaumanor Hall in Leicestershire and decrypted by the Police Section of the British Government Code and Cypher School at Bletchley Park, who had broken the SS Enigma cypher in 1940. The cryptanalysts assigned fruit-based codenames to the various Enigma settings used by the SS; the setting used by the camps was designated 'Orange'. Both of Höfle's telegrams were sent using the Orange setting and both were intercepted and decrypted, although the telegram to Eichmann was only partially captured.

The British decryption of SS internal communications meant that they were aware that Jews were being massacred by the Einsatzgruppen in autumn 1941 and spring 1942, but there had been no further references using the standard euphemisms, "Special Duties" and "actions according to the usages of war". Intercepted communications from known camps seemed to indicate they were work camps, if ones with high mortality rates. The British analysts who decrypted the message had failed to identify the Operation Reinhard camps, and did not know that Operation Reinhard was a plan to exterminate the Jews in the General Government, so Höfle's references to "L", "B", "S" and "T" were not understood. The telegrams were included without analysis under "miscellaneous" in a monthly round-up of decrypts and no further action was taken.

=== Declassification and recognition ===
The telegrams were filed in the British classified archives at Kew until 1997 when the intercepts of the Police Section were declassified. In 2001, researchers Peter Witte and Stephen Tyas announced the rediscovery of the telegram and noted its significance in a paper published by Holocaust and Genocide Studies.

== Contents of the telegram ==
As transcribed, and as translated into English by Witte and Tyas, the telegram reads:

Original in the German language

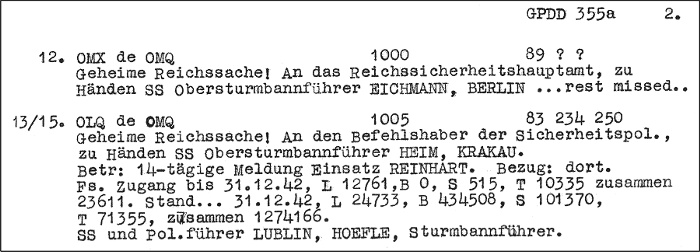
The Höfle telegram (including two minor PRO annotations)

Complete English translation:

12. OMX de OMQ 1000 89 ? ?
State Secret! To the Reich Security Main Office, for
the attention of SS Obersturmbannführer EICHMANN, Berlin [...rest missed...]
13/15. OLQ de OMQ 1005 83 234 250
State Secret! To the Senior Commander of the Security Police [and the Security Service],
for the attention of SS Obersturmbannführer HEIM, CRACOW.
Re: 14-day report Einsatz REINHART. Reference: radio telegram therefrom.
. Recorded arrivals until December 31, 42, L 12761, B 0, S 515, T 10335 together
23611. sum total [as per] December 31, 42, L 24733, B 434508, S 101370,
T 71355, [read- 713 555], together 1274166.
SS and Police Leader Lublin, HÖFLE, Sturmbannführer.

== Analysis ==
After its rediscovery, the meaning of the information in the Höfle telegram was determined by Witte and Tyas as follows.

Destinations	"Arrivals" for 2 weeks prior to 31 December 1942	Sum total as of 31 December 1942
L (Lublin, i.e. Majdanek) (Note: Witte and Tyas rejected the possibility that "L" referred to the Janowska concentration camp in Lemberg.)	12,761	24,733
B (Belzec)	0 (Note: The last trainload of Jewish victims arrived at Belzec on 11 December 1942.)	434,508
S (Sobibor)	515	101,370
T (Treblinka)	10,335	713,555
Total	23,611	1,274,166

=== Euphemistic usage of "Arrivals" ===
The perpetrators of the Holocaust routinely used Tarnwörter (camouflage or code words), such as Umsiedlung (resettlement), Endlösung der Judenfrage (Final Solution to the Jewish Question), and Sonderbehandlung (special treatment), to disguise the persecution and murder of their victims, even in unofficial or secret documents. In this context, the telegram's usage of Zugang (arrivals) at the extermination camps is a euphemism for the deaths of the victims, since to "arrive" at the Operation Reinhard camps meant certain death. Over 99.9% of those transported to the camps were murdered, with only two Jews surviving transport to Belzec, and only around fifty surviving transport to Treblinka or Sobibor.

Later, in the section of the Korherr Report based on Höfle's figures, Korherr replaced "arrivals" with Sonderbehandlung. Heinrich Himmler then insisted that this euphemism, which had become too well known, be replaced with a new, even more euphemistic term: Durchgeschleust (processed).

=== Treblinka error correction ===
Witte and Tyas subtracted the figures in the telegram for Jews killed in Lublin, Belzec and Sobibor from the total figure of 1,274,166, which was known to be correct because it appeared in the Korherr Report as the total number of Jews "processed" in the General Government district of German-occupied Poland. The calculation gave 713,555, rather than the 71,355 recorded, suggesting an error resulted in a missing digit in the process of writing, sending, intercepting, deciphering and transcribing the Höfle telegram. Therefore, the correct figure for the number of Jews killed in Treblinka was determined as 713,555.

=== Accuracy of figures ===
The figures given in the Höfle telegram are lower than those previously calculated. However, the Höfle telegram enumerated those murdered in the camps of Operation Reinhard up to the end of December 1942. It did not include figures for victims who died during transport to the camps, were shot during the operation, or died from disease or starvation due to German persecution. It also excluded deaths that occurred as the operation continued into 1943, after the telegram was sent.

Historian Marek Bem notes that the figures in the telegram for Sobibor conflict with survivor accounts and suggest that the Höfle telegram's figures only include transports from the General Government, not other areas, so the overall number of victims was higher than stated in the telegram.

== Historical significance ==
The Nazis made substantial efforts to hide both the Holocaust in general and Operation Reinhard in particular, both whilst it was being carried out and afterwards. For example, Sonderaktion 1005 attempted to remove physical evidence by exhuming, burning and crushing the victims' bodies, dismantling the extermination camps, and disguising the sites as farmland. Attempts were also made to destroy all written records of the operation. Only one copy of the minutes of the Wannsee Conference survived, and the entire archive of the Ordnungspolizei was burned in 1945, making their involvement in murdering the Jews impossible to directly quantify. Because of this, Allied intercepts and decryptions of Nazi communications provide invaluable evidence of the Holocaust. Much of this evidence was slow to emerge, as Allied signals intelligence was not declassified until the 1990s. Other signals intelligence, particularly from the former Soviet Union, remains classified in Russia.

Historians regard the Höfle telegram as a reliable record of the death toll at the Operation Reinhard camps through the end of 1942, as it confirms related research. For example, the telegram's totals are identical to those for Jews "processed at the camps of the General Government" in the Korherr Report, a statistical account of the progress of the Holocaust drawn up at Heinrich Himmler's request for presentation to Hitler. This adds to historians' understanding of how information about the progress of the Holocaust was reported to the highest levels and makes the Höfle telegram "of fundamental importance for any discussion of the numbers of Jewish victims in Poland".

=== Majdanek ===
The Höfle telegram confirmed that the concentration camp at Lublin (Majdanek) was administratively part of Operation Reinhard, a connection historians had not previously fully established. The discovery of the telegram also affected death-toll estimates for the camp, which previously ranged from 50,000, in Raul Hilberg's 1961 study The Destruction of the European Jews, to 235,000 estimated by Czesław Rajca of the Majdanek State Museum in 1992. In 2005, following a reassessment that drew in part on the Höfle telegram's figures, museum historian Tomasz Kranz revised the estimate to approximately 78,000–80,000 victims, a figure the museum board accepted as highly authoritative, but not final. After presenting the revised figures, Kranz commented that, "It must be remembered, however, that the number of victims only gives an idea about the scale of genocide; it does not convey the measureless pain and suffering experienced by the people imprisoned and murdered at Majdanek."

== See also ==
- Special Prosecution Book-Poland – 1937–1939 arrest list of Polish people prepared by Nazi Germany
- Jäger Report – 1941 record of executions by a Nazi death squad
- Einsatzgruppen reports – 1941–1942 internal Nazi reports on the Holocaust
- Cornides Report – 1942 eyewitness account of the Bełżec extermination camp
- Riegner Telegram – 1942 communique on the Holocaust
- Grojanowski Report – 1942 eyewitness account of the Holocaust
- Katzmann Report – 1943 German report on the Holocaust
- Stroop Report – Nazi report about the 1943 Warsaw Ghetto Uprising
- Posen speeches – Himmler's 1943 speeches to Nazi officials
- Pilecki's Report – 1943 document about the Auschwitz concentration camp
- Auschwitz Protocols – 1943/44 eyewitness accounts of concentration camp
- Sonderkommando photographs – 1944 photographs of Auschwitz concentration camp
- Gerstein Report – 1945 eyewitness account of Belzec extermination camp
