= Korherr Report =

1943 Nazi statistical document about the Holocaust

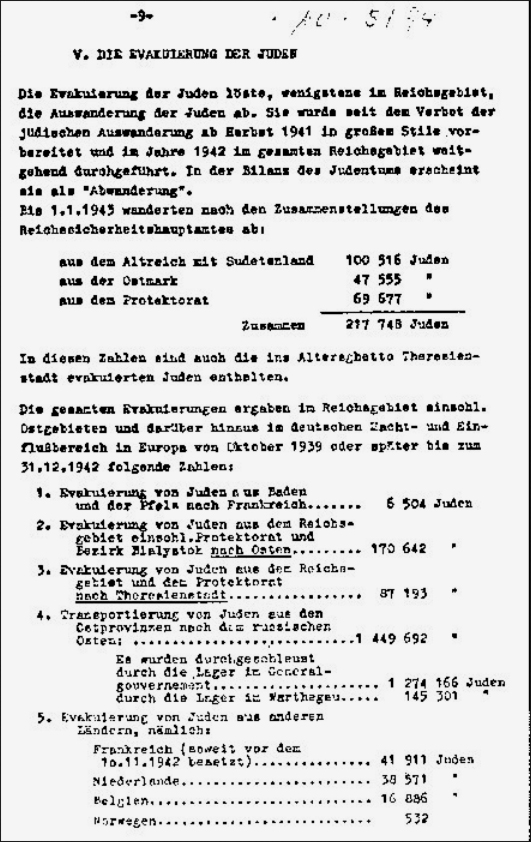
- Korherr Report, signed January 1943, page 9.: 4. Deported to the Russian east: 1,449,692 Jews Processed at the camps of the General Government: 1,274,166 Jews Processed in Warthegau: 145,301 Jews
- Date: (as of) December 31, 1942

The Korherr Report is a 1943 document giving statistics on the progress of the Holocaust in German-controlled Europe produced by the chief inspector of the statistical bureau of the SS, Richard Korherr under the title Die Endlösung der Judenfrage (The Final Solution to the Jewish Question).

The report, which calculated that the Jewish population of Europe had fallen by four million, was delivered to Heinrich Himmler and an abridged version was probably shared with Adolf Hitler.

== Production ==
The Korherr Report was commissioned by Himmler on the 18 January 1943 after he found previous reports on the progress of the Holocaust by Adolf Eichmann to be of low quality.

The initial report, sixteen pages long, was submitted on March 23, 1943, and accepted by Himmler, who requested Korherr produce an abridged version.

For the abridged report, Himmler insisted that Korherr change euphemistic references to the "Sonderbehandlung" or "special treatment," of the Jews. Instead he ordered that the word "durchgeschleust": "processed" or "lead through" should be used.

On Himmler's request an abridged version, six-and-a-half pages long, was produced, with statistics updated to March 31, 1943.

== Contents ==
The full version of the Korherr Report calculated how many Jews remained in Germany, Austria and Europe; detailed the numbers of Jews detained in the Nazi concentration camps; how many Jews had died natural deaths since 1933; and how many Jews had been subjected to Sonderbehandlung. It stated that, from 1937 to December 1942, the number of Jews in Europe had fallen by 4 million.

Korherr ascribed this fall to "emigration, partially due to the excess mortality of the Jews in Central and Western Europe, partially due to the evacuations especially in the more heavily populated Eastern Territories, which are here counted as ongoing."

The report stated that between October 1939 and December 31, 1942, 1,274,166 Jews had been killed (in the first report subjected to Sonderbehandlung or in the second "processed") at the camps of the General Government ("the occupied former Polish territories") and 145,301 at the camps in the formally German-annexed Warthegau (the location of Kulmhof).

The decrease of Soviet Russian Jews from the territories overrun in Operation Barbarossa was not included due to lack of statistical data. Korherr stating that:

It must not be overlooked in this respect that of the deaths of Soviet Russian Jews in the occupied Eastern territories only a part was recorded, whereas deaths in the rest of European Russia and at the front are not included at all. In addition there are movements of Jews inside Russia to the Asian part which are unknown to us. The movement of Jews from the European countries outside the German influence is also of a largely unknown order of magnitude. On the whole European Jewry should since 1933, i.e. in the first decade of National Socialist German power, have lost almost half of its population.

The summaries came from the RSHA office receiving all SS reports about the progress of the Holocaust.

== Usage ==
After the initial report was made and delivered to Himmler, he requested that he receive short monthly reports there after.

On the 9 April 1943 Himmler described the Korherr Report as "excellent" to the director of the Reich Security Main Office, Ernst Kaltenbrunner, and stated that although it could eventually be released as "camouflage", until then it should remain secret.

During the Eichmann trial, Eichmann testified that the report made his job "much easier.", as Koherr having identified how many Jews remained in each area helped him to plan their destruction.

The six-page abridged report was likely presented to Adolf Hitler by Himmler, as it was sent to be typed up on the 'Führer typewriter' which produced extra-large print. Korherr later stated that he received the report back annotated by Himmler with "The Führer has taken note".

== Post-war ==
After the war Korherr was initially held in Allied custody but was one of the first to be released. He was then hired at the West Germany Ministry of Finance. However, he was dismissed in 1961 after Gerald Reitlinger’s 1953 book The Final Solution revealed the role of the Korherr Report in the Holocaust.

=== Korheer's denial of responsibility ===
Korherr denied knowing about mass killings of Jews at the time he compiled the report, stating that he "only heard about exterminations after the collapse in 1945."

In a letter he sent to the German magazine Der Spiegel in July 1977, Korherr said that he had not calculated the number of Jewish victims "on Himmler's order," but been given that number by the SS and told to publish it "without changing a number or word." He also denied that Sonderbehandlung was a euphemism for 'killed', stating that:

The statement that I had mentioned that over a million Jews had died in the camps of the Generalgouvernement and the Warthegau through special treatment is also inaccurate. I must protest against the word 'died' in this context. It was the very word 'Sonderbehandlung' that led me to call the RSHA by phone and ask what this word meant. I was given the answer that these were Jews who were settled in the Lublin district.

Muehlenkamp notes that Korherr's claimed belief of resettlement in Lublin is contradicted by his own report; which states that just 20,000 Jews remained in the Lublin ghetto, and that his report was explicitly totalling the reduction in Jewish population in Europe.

== See also ==
- Jäger Report, 1941
- Einsatzgruppen reports, 1941–1942
- Wilhelm Cornides Report, 1942
- Wannsee Conference, 1942
- Katzmann Report, 1943
- Gerstein Report, 1945
- Riegner Telegram, 1942
- Höfle Telegram with Einsatz Reinhardt arrivals, 1943
- Special Prosecution Book-Poland, 1937–1939
