= Jäger Report =

1941 record of executions by a Nazi death squad

Karl Jäger Report
Month (Note: Grouped by the ending date of the massacre)	Entries	Killed
June	1 entry	4,000
July	20 entries	4,400
August	33 entries	47,906
September	38 entries	40,997
October	12 entries	31,829
November	10 entries	8,211

The Jäger Report, also Jaeger Report (full title: Complete tabulation of executions carried out in the Einsatzkommando 3 zone up to December 1, 1941) was written on 1 December 1941 by Karl Jäger, commander of Einsatzkommando 3 (EK 3), a death squad of Einsatzgruppe A attached to Army Group North in the Operation Barbarossa. It is the most detailed and precise surviving chronicle of the activities of one individual Einsatzkommando, and a key record documenting the Holocaust in Lithuania as well as in Latvia and Belarus.

== Description ==
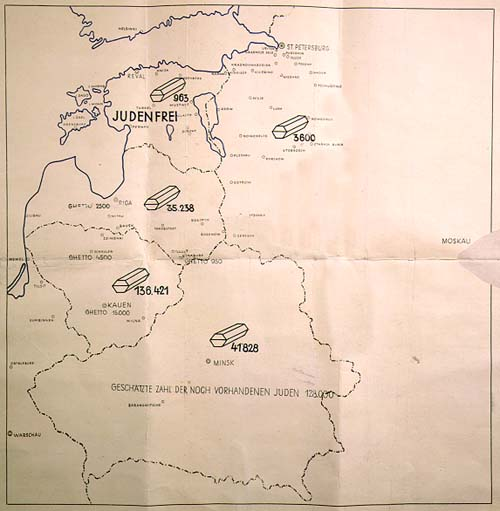
Map Stahlecker attached to his second report to Reinhard Heydrich using the execution tally from the updated Jäger report

The Jäger Report is a tally sheet of actions by Einsatzkommando 3, including the Rollkommando Hamann killing squad. The report keeps an almost daily running total of the murders of 137,346 people, the vast majority Jews, from 2 July 1941 to 25 November 1941. The report documents date and place of the massacres, number of victims and their breakdown into categories (Jews, communists, criminals, etc.). In total, there were 112 executions in 71 different locations in Lithuania, Latvia, and Belarus. On 17 occasions, daily casualties exceeded 2,000 people. On 9 February 1942, in a handwritten note for Franz Walter Stahlecker, Jäger updated the totals to 138,272 people: 136,421 Jews (46,403 men, 55,556 women and 34,464 children), 1,064 communists, 653 mentally disabled, and 134 others. The report concluded that Lithuania was now free of Jews except for about 34,500 Jews concentrated in Vilnius, Kaunas and Šiauliai Ghettos. However, Jäger Report did not tally all Jewish deaths in Lithuania as it did not include executions by Einsatzkommando 2 in Šiauliai area (approx. 46,000 people), in some border areas (for example, in Šakiai on September 13, Kudirkos Naumiestis on September 19, Kretinga in July–August, Gargždai on June 24, 1941), or even in Vilnius (for example, the report is missing the October 1 (Yom Kippur) massacre of some 4,000 Jews).

Jäger concluded his report with the following:

German original	English translation
Ich kann heute feststellen, dass das Ziel, das Judenproblem für Litauen zu lösen, vom EK. 3 erreicht worden ist. In Litauen gibt es keine Juden mehr, ausser den Arbeitsjuden incl. ihrer Familien. Das sind in Schaulen ca. 4 500 in Kauen " 15 000 in Wilna " 15 000. Diese Arbeitsjuden incl. ihrer Familien wollte ich ebenfalls umlegen, was mir jedoch scharfe Kampfansage der Zivilverwaltung (dem Reichskommissar) und der Wehrmacht eintrug und das Verbot auslöste: Diese Juden und ihre Familien dürfen nicht erschossen werden! Das Ziel, Litauen judenfrei zu machen, konnte nur erreicht werden durch die Aufstellung eines Rollkommandos mit ausgesuchten Männern unter der Führung des SS-Obersturmführers Hamann, der sich meine Ziele voll und ganz aneignete und es verstand, die Zusammenarbeit mit den litauischen Partisanen und den zuständigen zivilen Stellen zu gewährleisten....	I can confirm today that the goal of solving the Jewish problem for Lithuania has been achieved by EK. 3. In Lithuania, there are no more Jews, except for the Arbeitsjuden ["labor Jews"] incl. their families. These are in Schaulen ca. 4 500 in Kauen " 15 000 in Wilna " 15 000. I also wanted to put down these Arbeitsjuden ["labor Jews"] incl. their families, but this provoked a sharp conflict with the civil administration (the Reichskommissar) and the Wehrmacht, and resulted in the prohibition: these Jews and their families must not be shot! The goal to make Lithuania judenfrei ["Jew-free"] could only be achieved through the establishment of a Rollkommando ["rolling detachment"] with selected men under the leadership of SS-Obersturmführer Hamann, who fully embraced my objectives and understood how to ensure cooperation with the Lithuanian partisans and the relevant civil authorities....

The nine-page report was prepared in five copies, but only one survives, kept by the Special Archive of the Russian State Military Archive in Moscow. The copy was discovered in 1944 when the Red Army reoccupied Lithuania, but it was not made known to scholars or the judiciary evaluating Nazi war crimes. Only in 1963, during the in absentia trial of Hans Globke in East Germany and four years after Jäger's suicide, did the Soviet Ministry of Foreign Affairs disclose the document to the German Central Office of the State Justice Administrations for the Investigation of National Socialist Crimes. The document was first published in a Lithuanian collection of documents Masinės žudynės Lietuvoje in 1965 and in the Western press by Adalbert Rückerl in 1972 as a facsimile.

== Report tabulation ==
Date	Location	Jews (Note: If breakdown of Jews not specified, men, women and children are included in a single column)			Others (Note: Includes mostly communists and mentally ill)	Total (Note: Total is given per original report. Errors in addition are noted with "(Error in math)".)	Notes
Date	Location	Men	Women	Children	Others	Total	Notes
4 Jul 1941	Kaunas Seventh Fort	416	47			463	By "Lithuanian partisans", i.e. TDA
6 Jul	Kaunas Seventh Fort	2,514				2,514	By TDA
7 Jul	Marijampolė	32				32	By Rollkommando Hamann (from here on)
8 Jul	Marijampolė	14			5	19	
8 Jul	Girkalnis				6	6	Communist officials
9 Jul	Vandžiogala	32	2		4	38	
9 Jul	Kaunas Seventh Fort	21	3			24	
14 Jul	Marijampolė	21			10	31	
17 Jul	Babtai	6			2	8	All communists
18 Jul	Marijampolė	39	14			53	
19 Jul	Kaunas Seventh Fort	17	2		7	26	
21 Jul	Panevėžys	59	11		33	103	
22 Jul	Panevėžys	1				1	
23 Jul	Kėdainiai	83	12		30	125	
25 Jul	Marijampolė	90	13			103	
28 Jul	Panevėžys	234	15		39	288	
29 Jul	Raseiniai	254			3	257	
30 Jul	Ariogala	27			11	38	
31 Jul	Utena	235	16		5	256	
31 Jul	Vandžiogala	13			2	15	
1 Aug	Ukmergė	254	42		4	300	
2 Aug	Kaunas Fourth Fort	171	34		4	209	
4 Aug	Panevėžys	362	41		19	422	
5 Aug	Raseiniai	213	66			279	
7 Aug	Utena	483	87		1	571	
8 Aug	Ukmergė	620	82			702	
9 Aug	Kaunas Fourth Fort	484	50			534	
11 Aug	Panevėžys	450	48		2	500	
13 Aug	Alytus	617	100		1	719	(Error in math)
14 Aug	Jonava	497	55			552	
15–16 Aug	Rokiškis	3,200			7	3,207	
9–16 Aug	Raseiniai		294	4		298	
27 Jun – 14 Aug	Rokiškis	493			488	981	All active communists
18 Aug	Kaunas Fourth Fort	1,409	402		1	1,812	Including 711 Jewish intellectuals from Ghetto in reprisal for sabotage action
19 Aug	Ukmergė	298	255	88	2	645	(Error in math)
22 Aug	Daugavpils	1	1		20	21	Prison inspection (Error in math)
22 Aug	Aglona				544	544	Mentally ill (269 men, 227 women, and 48 children). Located in Latvia.
23 Aug	Panevėžys	1,312	4,602	1,609		7,523	
18–22 Aug	Raseiniai environs	466	440	1,020		1,926	
25 Aug	Obeliai	112	627	421		1,160	
25–26 Aug	Šeduva	230	275	159		664	
26 Aug	Zarasai	767	1,113	687	2	2,569	
28 Aug	Pasvalys	402	738	209		1,349	
26 Aug	Kaišiadorys	1,911				1,911	Unspecified
27 Aug	Prienai	1,078				1,078	Unspecified
27 Aug	Dagda and Krāslava	212			4	216	Located in Latvia
27 Aug	Joniškis	47	165	143		355	
28 Aug	Vilkija	76	192	134		402	
28 Aug	Kėdainiai	710	767	599		2,076	
29 Aug	Rumšiškės and Žiežmariai	20	567	197		784	
29 Aug	Utena and Molėtai	582	1,731	1,469		3,782	
13-31 Aug	Alytus and environs	233				233	
1 Sep	Marijampolė	1,763	1,812	1,404	111	5,090	Others include 109 mentally ill
28 Aug – 2 Sep	Darsūniškis	10	69	20		99	
28 Aug – 2 Sep	Garliava	73	113	61		247	
28 Aug – 2 Sep	Jonava	112	1,200	244		1,556	
28 Aug – 2 Sep	Petrasiunai	30	72	23		125	
28 Aug – 2 Sep	Jieznas	26	72	46		144	
28 Aug – 2 Sep	Ariogala	207	260	195		662	
28 Aug – 2 Sep	Josvainiai	86	110	86		282	
28 Aug – 2 Sep	Babtai	20	41	22		83	
28 Aug – 2 Sep	Vandžiogala	42	113	97		252	
28 Aug – 2 Sep	Krakės	448	476	201		1,125	
4 Sep	Pravieniškės	247	6			253	
4 Sep	Čekiškė	22	64	60		146	
4 Sep	Seredžius	6	61	126		193	
4 Sep	Veliuona	2	71	86		159	
4 Sep	Zapyškis	47	118	13		178	
5 Sep	Ukmergė	1,123	1,849	1,737		4,709	
25 Aug – 6 Sep	Raseiniai	16	412	415		843	
25 Aug – 6 Sep	Jurbarkas	412				412	
9 Sep	Alytus	287	640	352		1,279	
9 Sep	Butrimonys	67	370	303		740	
10 Sep	Merkinė	223	355	276		854	
10 Sep	Varėna	541	141	149		831	
11 Sep	Leipalingis	60	70	25		155	
11 Sep	Seirijai	229	384	340		953	
12 Sep	Simnas	68	197	149		414	
11–12 Sep	Užusaliai				43	43	Reprisal against locals helping Russian partisans
26 Sep	Kaunas Fourth Fort	412	615	581		1,608	Sick and suspected epidemic cases
2 Oct	Žagarė	633	1,107	496		2,236	As Jews were led away, they mutinied but it was quickly subdued
4 Oct	Kaunas Ninth Fort	315	712	818		1,845	Reprisal after a German police officer shot in ghetto
29 Oct	Kaunas Ninth Fort	2,007	2,920	4,273		9,200	"Mopping up ghetto of superfluous Jews" (see Kaunas massacre of October 29, 1941)
3 Nov	Lazdijai	485	511	539		1,535	
15 Nov	Vilkaviškis	36	48	31		115	
25 Nov	Kaunas Ninth Fort	1,159	1,600	175		2,934	Jews from Berlin, Munich and Frankfurt am Main (see Ninth Fort massacres of November 1941)
29 Nov	Kaunas Ninth Fort	693	1,155	152		2,000	Jews from Vienna and Breslau
29 Nov	Kaunas Ninth Fort	17	1		17	34	(Error in math)
13 Jul – 21 Aug	Daugavpils	9,012			573	9,585	EK 3 detachment in Daugavpils, Latvia
12 Aug – 1 Sep	Vilnius	425	19		17	461	EK 3 detachment in Vilnius (Note: EK 3 took over from EK 9 in Vilnius) (from here on)
2 Sep	Vilnius	864	2,019	817		3,700	Reprisal for shooting at German soldiers
12 Sep	Vilnius	993	1,670	771		3,334	(Error in math)
17 Sep	Vilnius	337	687	247	4	1,271	(Error in math)
20 Sep	Nemenčinė	128	176	99		403	
22 Sep	Naujoji Vilnia	468	495	196		1,159	
24 Sep	Riešė	512	744	511		1,767	
25 Sep	Jašiūnai	215	229	131		575	
27 Sep	Eišiškės	989	1,636	821		3,446	
30 Sep	Trakai	366	483	597		1,446	
4 Oct	Vilnius	432	1,115	436		1,983	
6 Oct	Semeliškės	213	359	390		962	
9 Oct	Švenčionys	1,169	1,840	717		3,726	
16 Oct	Vilnius	382	507	257		1,146	
21 Oct	Vilnius	718	1,063	586		2,367	
25 Oct	Vilnius		1,766	812		2,578	
27 Oct	Vilnius	946	184	73		1,203	
30 Oct	Vilnius	382	789	362		1,533	
6 Nov	Vilnius	340	749	252		1,341	
19 Nov	Vilnius	76	77	18		171	
19 Nov	Vilnius				14	14	POWs and Poles
20 Nov	Vilnius				3	3	POWs
25 Nov	Vilnius	9	46	8	1	64	
28 Sep – 17 Oct	Plyeshchanitsy, Bischolin, (Note: As spelled in the original report); Šack, Bobr, Uzda	620	1,285	1,126	19	3,050	EK 3 detachment in Minsk, Belarus
		4,000				4,000	Prior to EK 3 taking over (see: Kaunas pogrom)
Totals		57,338	48,592	29,461	2,058	137,346	

== See also ==
- Einsatzgruppen reports, 1941–1942
- Wilhelm Cornides Report, 1942
- Katzmann Report, 1943
- Korherr Report, 1943
- Gerstein Report, 1945
- Riegner Telegram, 1942
- Höfle Telegram, 1943
- Special Prosecution Book-Poland, 1937–1939
- Bibliography of the Holocaust § Primary Sources
