= Gerstein Report =

1945 eyewitness account of Belzec extermination camp

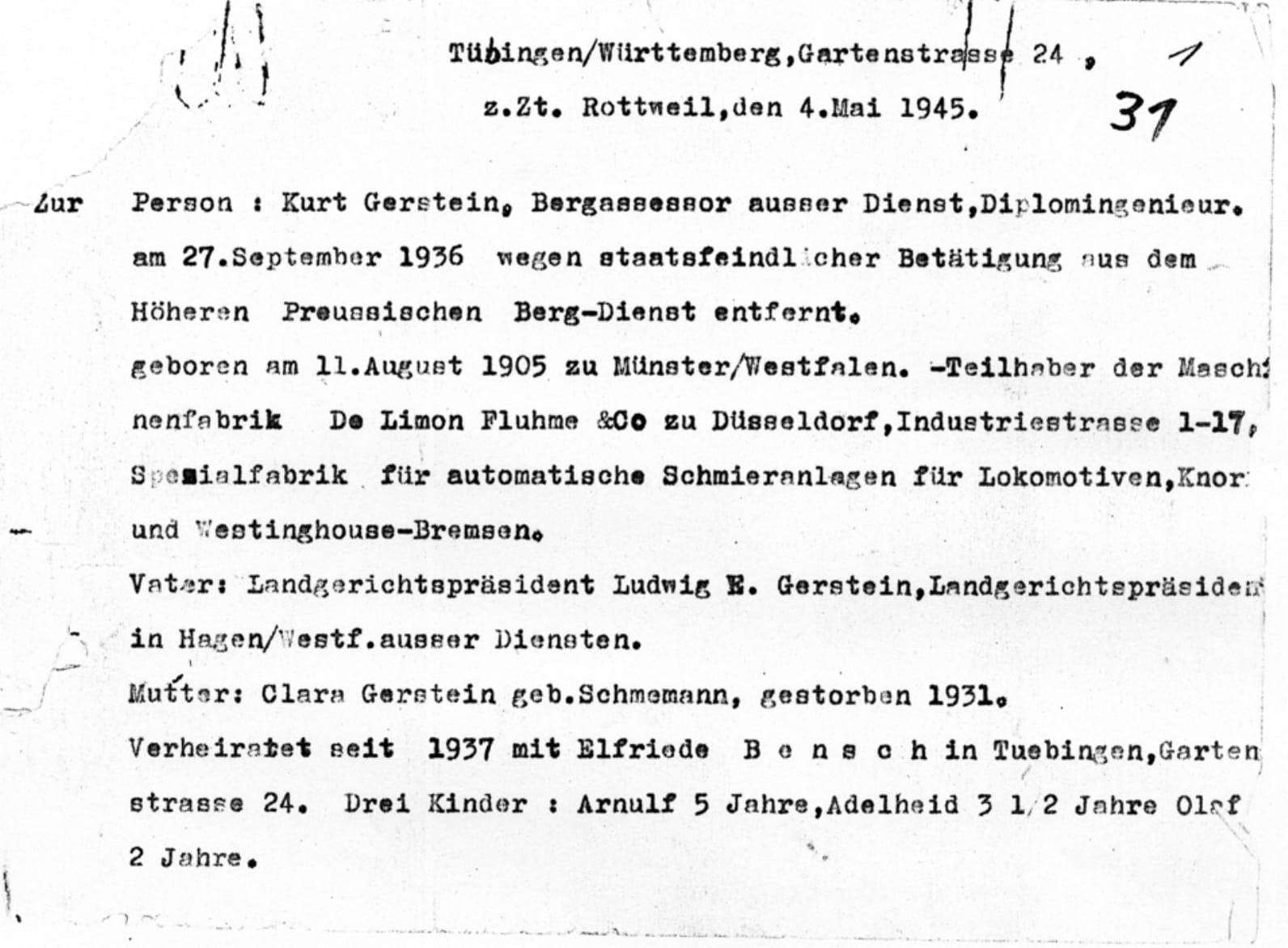
- Image of the first page of the German language version of the report
- Created: 1945
- Author: Kurt Gerstein
- Media type: Eyewitness account
- Subject: Holocaust

The Gerstein Report was written in 1945 by Kurt Gerstein, Obersturmführer of the SS-TV, who served as Head of Technical Disinfection Services of the SS during the Second World War and in that capacity supplied Zyklon B, a pesticide based on hydrogen cyanide, from the chemical company Degesch (Deutsche Gesellschaft für Schädlingsbekämpfung) to Rudolf Höss in Auschwitz.

On 18 August 1942, along with Rolf Günther and Wilhelm Pfannenstiel, Gerstein witnessed the gassing of some 3,000 Jews at the Belzec extermination camp in occupied Poland. The report features his eyewitness testimony and was later used as evidence at the Nuremberg Trials.

When Gerstein surrendered to the French Commandant in the occupied town of Reutlingen on 22 April 1945, he was sent to the town of Rottweil, where he was placed under "honourable captivity" and was given accommodation in the Hotel Mohren. There, he composed his report, first in French and then in German.

== Personal details ==
Kurt Gerstein, member of the SS, author of the Gerstein Report, during World War II

Gerstein was born on 11 August 1905 in Münster, where he lived until 1910 and then to Saarbrücken; Halberstadt; and Neuruppin, near Berlin, where he finished his secondary school in 1925. He attended universities in Marburg, Aachen, and Berlin and received an engineering degree in 1931. During his studies, he was active in the Protestant youth movements.

He joined the Nazi Party in May 1933. As a committed Christian, Gerstein resisted attempts by the Nazis to control the Christian youth movement and ran afoul of state authorities. He was expelled from the party in October 1936 after his arrest in September for circulating anti-Nazi pamphlets. Released, he was arrested a second time in July 1938 and spent two months in a concentration camp. Reportedly outraged by the involuntary euthanasia programme, Aktion T4, he decided to join the Waffen SS "to look into the matter of these ovens and chambers in order to learn what happened there".

Because of his technical education, Gerstein was placed in the Waffen-SS technical disinfection services, where he rose quickly to become its head. It was in that capacity that he travelled to the extermination camps of Belzec and Treblinka to offer the supply of hydrogen cyanide (Zyklon B).

== Testimony regarding gas chambers ==
Location of Bełżec (lower centre) on the map of German extermination camps marked with black-and-white skulls in occupied Poland

Gerstein stated that on 18 August 1942, he travelled to the Belzec extermination camp, where he witnessed the arrival of "45 wagons with 6,700 people of whom 1,450 were already dead on arrival". He described the gassing operation as it happened directly in front of him:

Then the procession starts moving. In front a very lovely young girl; so all of them go along the alley, all naked, men, women, children, without artificial limbs. I myself stand together with Hauptmann Wirth on top of the ramp between the gas chambers. Mothers with babies at their breast, they come onward, hesitate, enter the death chambers! At the corner a strong SS man stands who, with a voice like a pastor, says to the poor people: "There is not the least chance that something will happen to you! You must only take a deep breath in the chamber, that widens the lungs; this inhalation is necessary because of the illnesses and epidemics." On the question of what would happen to them he answered: "Yes, of course, the men have to work, building houses and roads but the women don't need to work. Only if they wish they can help in housekeeping or in the kitchen."

For some of these poor people this gave a little glimmer of hope, enough to go the few steps to the chambers without resistance. The majority are aware, the smell tells them of their fate! So they climb the small staircase, and then they see everything. Mothers with little children at the breast, little naked children, adults, men, women, all naked - they hesitate but they enter the death chambers, pushed forward by those behind them or driven by the leather whips of the SS. The majority without saying a word. A Jewess of about 40 years of age, with flaming eyes, calls down vengeance on the head of the murderers for the blood which is shed here. She gets 5 or 6 slashes with the riding crop into her face from Hauptmann Wirth personally, then she also disappears into the chamber. Many people pray. I pray with them, I press myself in a corner and shout loudly to my and their God. How gladly I would have entered the chamber together with them, how gladly I would have died the same death as them. Then they would have found a uniformed SS man in their chambers - the case would have been understood and treated as an accident, one man quietly missing. Still I am not allowed to do this. First I must tell what I am experiencing here! The chambers fill. "Pack well!" - Hauptmann Wirth has ordered. The people stand on each other's feet. 700 - 800 on 25 square metres, in 45 cubic metres! The SS physically squeezes them together, as far as is possible.

The doors close. At the same time the others are waiting outside in the open air, naked. Someone tells me: "The same in winter!" "Yes, but they could catch their death of cold," I say. "Yes, exactly what they are here for!" says an SS man to me in his Low German. Now I finally understand why the whole installation is called the Hackenholt-Foundation. Hackenholt is the driver of the diesel engine, a little technician, also the builder of the facility. The people are brought to death with the diesel exhaust fumes. But the diesel doesn't work! Hauptmann Wirth comes. One can see that he feels embarrassed that that happens just today, when I am here. That's right, I see everything! And I wait. My stop watch has honestly registered everything. 50 minutes, 70 minutes [?] - the diesel doesn't start! The people are waiting in their gas chambers. In vain! One can hear them crying, sobbing.... Hauptmann Wirth hits the Ukrainian who is helping Unterscharführer Hackenholt 12, 13 times in the face. After two hours and 49 minutes - the stop watch has registered everything well - the diesel starts. Until this moment the people live in these 4 chambers, four times 750 people in 4 times 45 cubic metres! Again 25 minutes pass. Right, many are dead now. One can see that through the small window in which the electric light illuminates the chambers for a moment. After 28 minutes only a few are still alive. Finally, after 32 minutes, everyone is dead!

— Gerstein Report

== Reporting ==
The final part of the report describes Gerstein's attempts to circulate his eyewitness testimony. He reports on his chance encounter with the secretary of the Swedish legation in Berlin, Baron Göran von Otter, on the Warsaw-Berlin train: "Still under the immediate impression of the terrible events, I told him everything with the entreaty to inform his government and the Allies of all of this immediately because each day's delay must cost the lives of further thousands and tens of thousands". Von Otter talked with high-ranking officials at the Swedish Foreign Ministry. However, the information was not passed on to the Allies or to any other party. He also reports on his unsuccessful attempts to see the Papal Nuncio Cesare Orsenigo in Berlin. Gerstein wished to notify the Vatican. Informed of the purpose of Gerstein's visit, Orsenigo refused to meet with him. Gerstein's message was eventually sent to the Vatican not by the nuncio's office but by the auxiliary bishop of Berlin, where the information reached a "dead end". In addition to those attempts, Gerstein also stated he reported these eyewitness accounts to "hundreds of personages." Although not explicitly mentioned in the 1945 report, one of the attempts was by a Dutch industrialist, J.H. Ubbink, who in February 1943 visited Gerstein in Berlin:

With great indignation [Gerstein] told me how the gassings took place using the exhaust gas from diesel engines. He gave me all the details and told me that at that time there were 9,000 deaths per day in the three camps.

— Letter from J.H. Ubbink to Erika Arajs, Department of Justice in Nuremberg, dated September 14, 1949

Ubbink passed the information on to a member of the Dutch Resistance, Cornelius Van der Hooft, who a few days later, on March 23, 1943, wrote "Tötungsanstalten in Polen" (English translation: "Killing Institutions in Poland"), a four-page report in Dutch that apparently remained hidden in the chicken coop of another member of the Dutch Resistance and did not come to light until 1996. The March report, however, seemed to have been sent to the Dutch government-in-exile, as on April 24, 1943, one month after the meeting between Van der Hooft and Ubbink, another version of the report inspired by Gerstein was written. Typed on paper without an official heading and with the simplified title of Tötungsanstalten, this version circulated within the Dutch government-in-exile via the British government and eventually to the attention of the Inter-Allied Information Committee.

== Use as evidence in trials ==
Gerstein's report has been used as evidence in a number of high-profile cases. It was used at the Nuremberg Trials against major Nazi war criminals such as Hermann Göring and Hans Frank. It was also later used in the 1961 prosecution of Adolf Eichmann by an Israeli court. In 2000, it was used by Christopher Browning in the Holocaust libel trial between David Irving and Deborah Lipstadt.

== Accuracy ==
Some aspects of Gerstein's report include false statements that were attributed to Odilo Globocnik, as well as inaccurate claims regarding the total number of Jews gassed at Holocaust locations in which he was not an eyewitness, but his claim that gassing of Jews occurred at Belzec was independently corroborated by SS-Standartenführer Wilhelm Pfannenstiel's testimony given at the Belzec trials, as well as by the accounts of other witnesses that can be found in Gitta Sereny's Into That Darkness, a biography of the Treblinka commandant Franz Stangl.

The Holocaust historian Christopher Browning noted:

Many aspects of Gerstein's testimony are unquestionably problematic. [In making] statements, such as the height of the piles of shoes and clothing at Belzec and Treblinka, Gerstein himself is clearly the source of exaggeration. Gerstein also added grossly exaggerated claims about matters to which he was not an eyewitness, such as that a total of 25 million Jews and others were gassed. But in the essential issue, namely that he was in Belzec and witnessed the gassing of a transport of Jews from Lwow, his testimony is fully corroborated.... It is also corroborated by other categories of witnesses from Belzec.

The historian Robin O'Neil noted that Gerstein's data presented at face value about the enormous capacity of the gas chambers of "four times 750 persons" has no grounds in reality.

The Gerstein Report has also been targeted by Holocaust deniers, who claim that its author approached Göran von Otter on behalf of the Nazis. The French historian Pierre Vidal-Naquet in "Assassins of Memory" considered such allegations to be preposterous.

== See also ==
- Jäger Report, 1941
- Einsatzgruppen reports, 1941–1942
- Wilhelm Cornides Report of what he saw at Belzec, 1942
- Wannsee Conference, 1942
- Katzmann Report, 1943
- Korherr Report, 1943
- Riegner Telegram, 1942
- Höfle Telegram, 1943
- Special Prosecution Book-Poland, 1937–1939
- Witold's Report, 1943
- Vrba-Wetzler report, 1944
- Karski's reports, 1940–1942
- Bibliography of the Holocaust § Primary Sources

== Notes and references ==
- Sereny, Gitta: Into That Darkness. McGraw-Hill, 1974. Also available as Into That Darkness: An Examination of Conscience, Vintage, 1983. ISBN 0-394-71035-5 or ISBN 978-0-394-71035-8.
