= Riegner telegram =

1942 communique on the Holocaust

Riegner Telegram
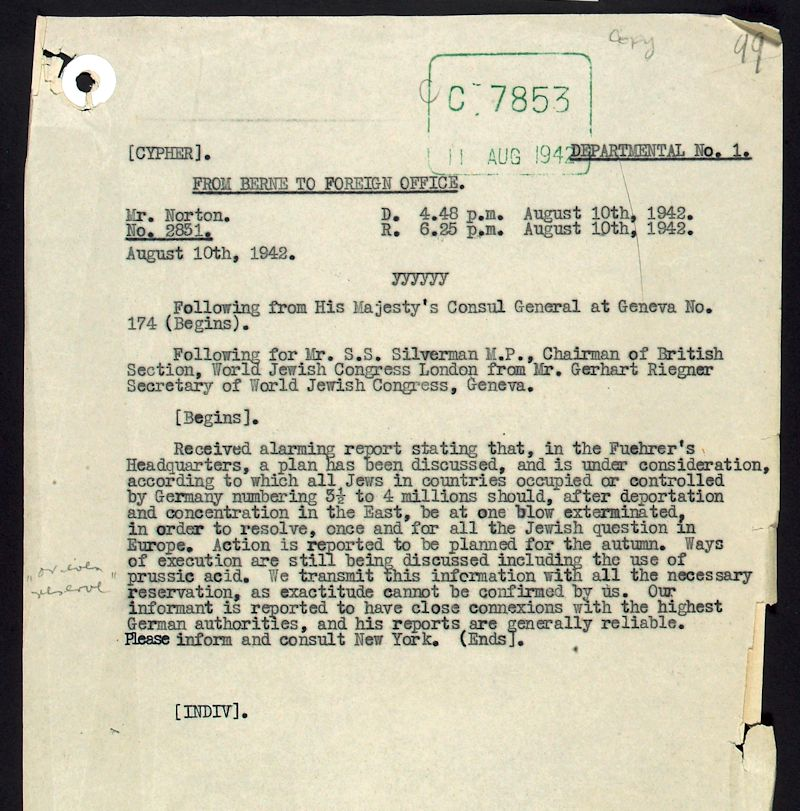
- The Riegner Telegram
- Created: August 8, 1942; 84 years ago
- Location: United States Library of Congress
- Commissioned by: World Jewish Congress
- Author: Gerhart Riegner
- Media type: Telegram
- Subject: Reports of the mass murder the Jews
- Purpose: Attempt to raise awareness of the Holocaust

The Riegner telegram was a telegraph message sent on 8 August 1942 from Gerhart Riegner, then Secretary of World Jewish Congress (Geneva), to its New York and London offices. The cable confirmed the alarming reports that had reached the West previously about the German intention to mass murder the European Jews.

== Background ==
Riegner was office manager of the WJC in Geneva. He was indirectly informed about the German plans for the final solution by German industrialist Eduard Schulte.

== Contents ==
Through his British and American diplomatic channels (Rabbi Stephen Samuel Wise of the American Jewish Congress in New York and Sydney Silverman, a Jewish Member of Parliament and Chairman of the British Section, World Jewish Congress) Riegner sent the following message to his contacts via the British Foreign Office and the State Department in Washington:

Received alarming report stating that, in the Fuehrer's Headquarters, a plan has been discussed, and is under consideration, according to which all Jews in countries occupied or controlled by Germany numbering 3½ to 4 millions should, after deportation and concentration in the East, be at one blow exterminated, in order to resolve, once and for all the Jewish question in Europe. Action is reported to be planned for the autumn. Ways of execution are still being discussed including the use of prussic acid. We transmit this information with all the necessary reservation, as exactitude cannot be confirmed by us. Our informant is reported to have close connexions with the highest German authorities, and his reports are generally reliable. Please inform and consult New York.

== Reception ==
In both the United Kingdom and the United States, Riegner's telegram was met with disbelief. The US State Department considered the telegram "a wild rumor, fueled by Jewish anxieties" while the British Foreign Office did not forward the telegram for some time. Only on 28 August 1942 did it find its way to the President of the World Jewish Congress, Rabbi Stephen Wise. On the advice of Under Secretary of State Sumner Welles, Wise decided to not make it public until confirmation had been received from State Department sources. When that happened in November, Wise held a press conference about it but it received little attention until the Bergson Group began to publicise it.

== See also ==
- Jäger Report, 1941
- Einsatzgruppen reports, 1941–1942
- Wilhelm Cornides Report, 1942
- Wannsee Conference, 1942
- Raczyński's Note, 1942
- Yitzchak Sternbuch Cable, September 2, 1942
- Pilecki's Report, 1943
- Katzmann Report, 1943
- Korherr Report, 1943
- Gerstein Report, 1945
- Vrba-Wetzler Report
- Karski's reports
- Allied knowledge of the atrocities
- Höfle telegram containing German statistics on the 1942 killings
- Special Prosecution Book-Poland, 1937–1939
- Bibliography of the Holocaust § Primary Sources

Encyclopedia article
