= Einsatzgruppen reports =

1941–1942 internal Nazi reports on the Holocaust

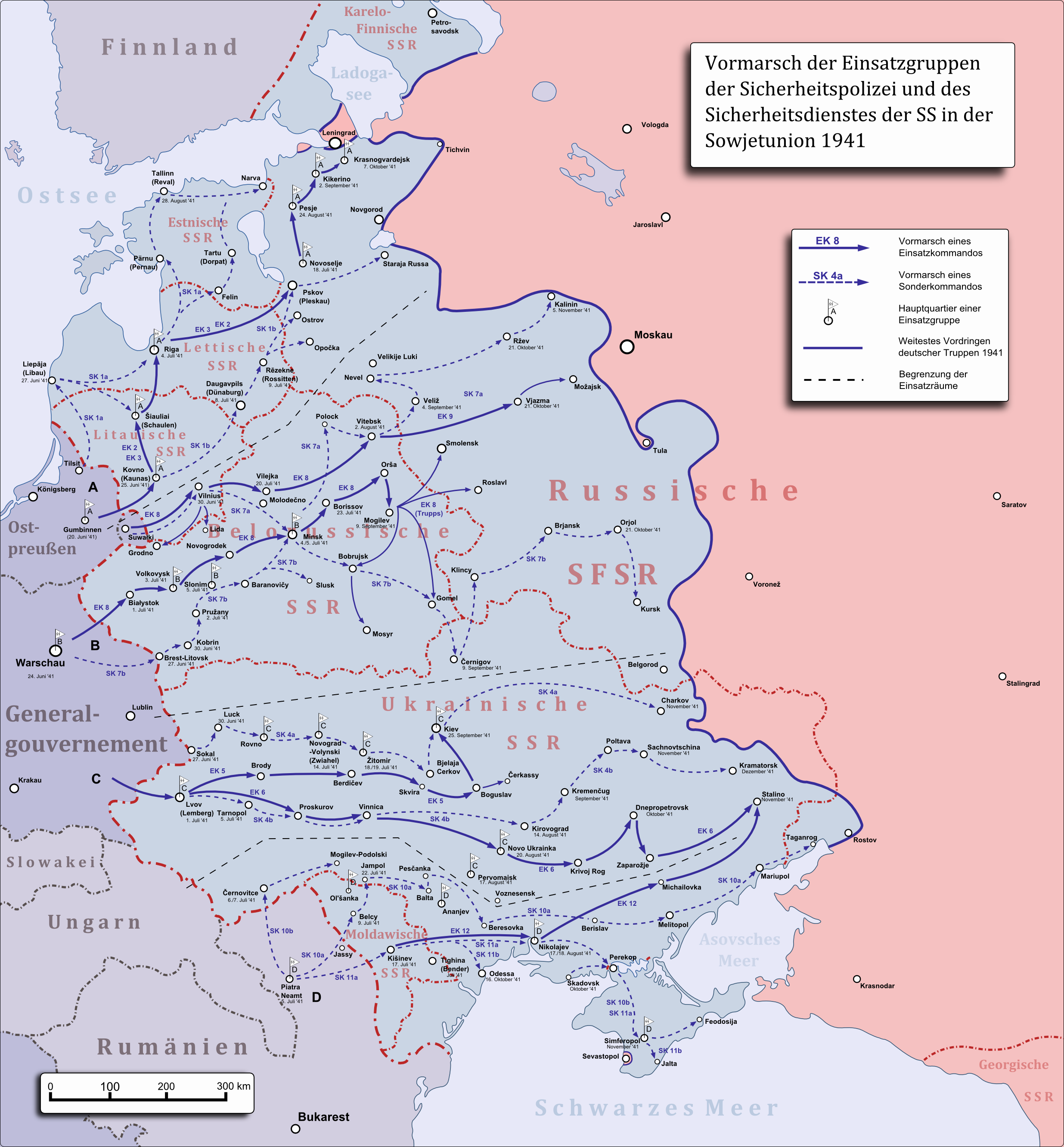
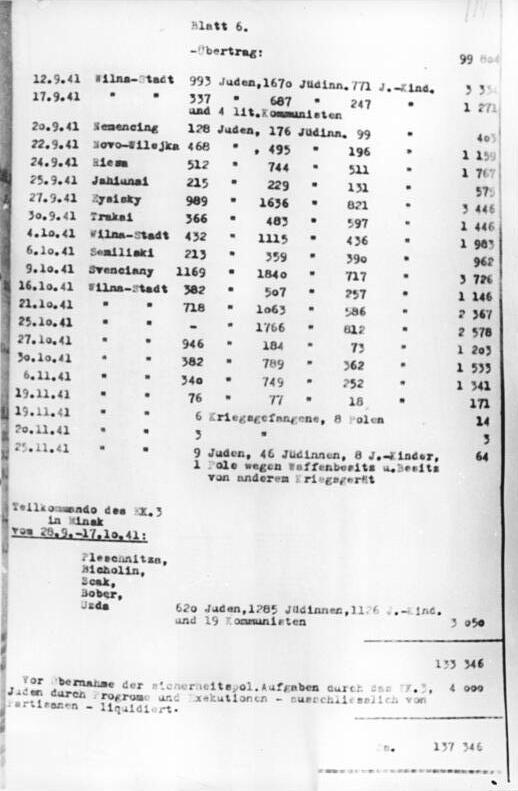
- Map of the Einsatzgruppen operations with the location of the first shooting of Jewish women and children (along with the men), July 30, 1941 The Jäger Report, December 1, 1941
- Incident type: The Einsatzgruppen shootings
- Organizations: Schutzstaffel (SS)

The Einsatzgruppen Operational Situation Reports (OSRs), or ERM for the German: Die Ereignismeldung UdSSR (plural: Ereignismeldungen), were dispatches of the Nazi death squads (Einsatzgruppen), which documented the progress of the Holocaust behind the German–Soviet frontier in the course of Operation Barbarossa, during World War II. The extant reports were sent between June 1941 and April 1942 to the Chief of the Security Police and the SD (German: Chef des Sicherheitspolizei und SD) in Berlin, from the occupied eastern territories including modern-day Poland, Belarus, Ukraine, Russia, Moldova, and the Baltic Countries. During the Nuremberg War Crimes Trials the originals were grouped according to year and month and catalogued using a consecutive numbering system, as listed in the below table. The original photostats are held at the National Archives in Washington D.C.

== Background ==
Following the onset of Operation Barbarossa, during the first 5 weeks of their shooting actions, the Einsatzgruppen squads targeted primarily male Jews. This changed on July 29, 1941, when Reinhard Heydrich himself, quoted at an SS meeting in Vileyka (Polish Wilejka), criticized their leaders for the low execution figures. It was therefore ordered that the Jewish women and children be included in all subsequent shooting operations. The first women and children were killed along with the men on July 30, 1941, in Vileyka.

The Nazi Einsatzgruppen were not the only formation tasked with the mass killings. Other formations included the Order Police battalions from Germany (Orpo) participating equally in the mass murder of Polish and Soviet Jews regardless of their age and sex, including in the territories of the formerly Soviet-occupied Poland (see the Red Friday massacre), the Baltic states, and in the USSR proper. Significant numbers of women and children were murdered behind all front lines not only by the Germans but also by the local Ukrainian and Lithuanian auxiliary forces. The largest mass shooting of Soviet Jews took place on September 29, 1941, in the ravine of Babi Yar near Kiev, where 33,771 Jews of all ages were machine-gunned (Situation Report No. 101).

== Original German cables ==
After World War II, the reports were grouped and numbered by the Allies in order to summarize their content. The actual German cables were sent in their own differing sequence including by the Einsatzgruppe A (EG–A) attached to Army Group North, Einsatzgruppe B (EG–B) attached to Army Group Center, Einsatzgruppe C (EG-C) attached to the Army Group South, and Einsatzgruppe D (EG–D) attached to the 11th Army. In the OSRs, individual Ereignismeldungen UdSSR (morning reports) abbr. EM, from EG–A appear in 103 different places. The reports from EG–B appear in 64 OSRs (as arranged by the Allies). The EG-C reports are listed in 77 different OSRs, and the reports from EG–D (with the least representation at source) are featured in 63 OSRs. Occasionally, large gaps appear between individual reports, caused by the lack of time or other complications including broken telephone lines in the East. Notably, in Operational Situation Report number 19, Einsatzgruppe C was changed to Einsatzgruppe B and vice versa, thus confusing further reports of their shooting actions.

The OSRs are far from being equal. Some of them, such as OSR 156, include translated cables from several cities and weeks of shooting actions not yet concluded with tens of thousands of victims mentioned; while other Operational Situation Reports, such as OSR 67, resemble long essays describing mere investigations into partisan activities in rural countryside resulting in dozens of executions. Notably, the reports do not include all killings before the end of 1942.

The following selection of reports are available in English translation. The complete set of reports is available in German.

Operational Situation Report (OSR) with dates: [Shootings]
- OSR 8 [A: Jul 2, 1941; Kaunas]
- OSR 10 [B,C: Jul 2, 1941; Lvov]
- OSR 12 [A: Jul 4, 1941; Riga]
- OSR 13 [C,B: Jul 5, 1941]
- OSR 14 [A,B,C: Jul 6, 1941]
- OSR 17 [C: Jul 7, 1941]
- OSR 19 [A,C,D: Jul 11, 1941]
- OSR 21 [B: Jul 13, 1941]
- OSR 24 [A,B,C: Jul 16, 1941]
- OSR 25 [D: Jul 17, 1941]
- OSR 26 [A,B: Jul 18, 1941]
- OSR 27 [B,C: Jul 19, 1941]
- OSR 34 [B: Jul 26, 1941]
- OSR 38 [C: Jul 30, 1941; Vileyka]
- OSR 45 [D: Aug 7, 1941]
- OSR 61 [D: Aug 23, 1941]
- OSR 63 [C,D: Aug 25, 1941]
- OSR 64 [D: Aug 1941]
- OSR 66 [Aug, 28 1941]
- OSR 67 [A,B,D: Aug 29, 1941]
- OSR 73 [B: Sep 4, 1941]
- OSR 78 [?: Sep 9, 1941; Genbezirke]
- OSR 80 [C: Sep 9, 1941]
- OSR 81 [C: Sep 12, 1941]
- OSR 86 [A,C: Sep 17, 1941]
- OSR 88 [A,C,D: Sep 19, 1941]
- OSR 91 [Sep 27, 1941]
- OSR 94 [A,C: Sep 27, 1941; Ostland]
- OSR 97 [C: Sep 27, 1941; Kiev]
- OSR 101 [C,D: Oct 2, 1941; Kiev]
- OSR 103 [D: Oc 4, 1941]
- OSR 106 [C: Oct 7, 1941]
- OSR 108 [B: Oct 9, 1941]
- OSR 112 [C: Oct 13, 1941]
- OSR 113 [D: Oct 15, 1941]
- OSR 116 [A: Oct 17, 1941]
- OSR 117 [D: Oct 18, 1941]
- OSR 119 [C: Oct 20, 1941]
- OSR 120 [?: Oct 21, 1941; Serbia]
- OSR 126 [?: Oct 27, 1941; Lvov, G.G.]
- OSR 128 [C: Nov 2, 1941]
- OSR 129 [D: Nov 5, 1941]
- OSR 131 [A: Nov 10, 1941]
- OSR 132 [C: Oct 27, 1941]
- OSR 133 [B: Nov 14, 1941]
- OSR 135 [C: Nov 19, 1941]
- OSR 136 [A,D: Nov 21, 1941]
- OSR 140 [A: Dec 1, 1941; Minsk]
- OSR 143 [C: Dec 8, 1941; Kiev]
- OSR 148 [B: Dec 19, 1941; Smolensk]
- OSR 149 [B: Dec 22, 1941]
- OSR 150 [A,D: Jan 2, 1942; Leningrad]
- OSR 151 [?: Jan 5, 1942; Riga]
- OSR 153 [D: Jan 9, 1942]
- OSR 156 [A,C,D: Jan 16, 1942]
- OSR 157 [D: Jan 19, 1942; Crimea]
- OSR 164 [A,C: Feb 4, 1942]
- OSR 173 [C: Feb 25, 1942]
- OSR 175 [A: Mar 2, 1942]
- OSR 176 [A: Mar 4, 1942]
- OSR 177 [C: Mar 6, 1942]
- OSR 178 [A,D: Mar 9, 1942]
- OSR 179 [B: Mar 11, 1942]
- OSR 183 [A: Mar 20, 1942]
- OSR 184 [A,D: Mar 23, 1942]
- OSR 186 [A: Mar 20, 1942]
- OSR 191 [A: Apr 10, 1942]
- OSR 193 [D: Apr 17, 1942]
- OSR 195 [A: Apr 24, 1942]

== See also ==
- Einsatzgruppen
- Einsatzkommando
- Gerstein Report, 1945
- Höfle Telegram, 1943
- Jäger Report, 1941
- Katzmann Report, 1943
- Korherr Report, 1943
- Riegner Telegram, 1942
- Special Prosecution Book-Poland, 1937–1939
- Bibliography of the Holocaust § Primary Sources
