= Katzmann Report =

1943 German report on the Holocaust

The Katzmann Report
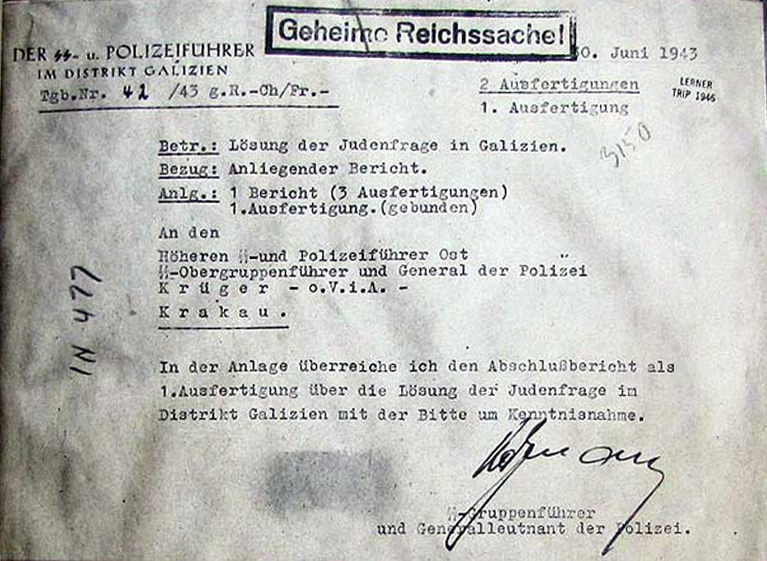
Cover page of the Katzmann Report

The Katzmann Report (or the Final Report by Katzmann) is one of the most important testimonies relating to the Holocaust in Poland and the extermination of Polish Jews during World War II. It was used as evidence in the Nuremberg Trials (USA No. L-18, Exhibit-277) and numerous other proceedings against war criminals abroad. It is a leather-bound report by SS-Gruppenführer Fritz Katzmann, German SS and Police Leader (SSPF) in the District of Galicia, entitled "Lösung der Judenfrage im Distrikt Galizien" (The Solution of the Jewish Question in the District of Galicia), submitted on 30 June 1943 to his superior officer, the Higher SS and Police Leader (HSSPF) "Ost" (East), SS-Obergruppenführer Friedrich-Wilhelm Krüger. It describes part of Operation Reinhard.

The Katzmann Report was published in German and illustrated with photographs of the systems of persecution. A Polish translation of the report was published in the 1950s, but was subject to communist censorship and it did not have an accompanying scholarly analysis; that came with a more recent edition by the Institute of National Remembrance. A full uncensored text of the report was published in 2009.

== Report as an artifact ==
Modern historians consider the report to be of limited value in terms of evidence because of its intentional distortion of some facts, meant to cover up the wholesale theft of gold and money by various German officials. The 62-page book attempts to present the extermination of Jews as an orderly operation. It begins with a photo collection titled "The Solution of the Jewish Problem in East Galicia", which is followed by a cost–benefit analysis. The report provides only a window into the scale of plunder. The totals are never rounded off. They are meant to lead the reader into believing in their authenticity.

The Katzmann Report was written not in the occupied territories but in Berlin after Katzmann's tour of duty in the District of Galicia where he personally directed the murder of between 55,000 and 65,000 Jews during 1941-1942 around Lemberg. In the following months, his "Jew hunts" coupled with roundups for mass deportations to death camps produced a death toll of 143,000 people. In all, the report described the murder of 434,329 Jews, implementing a thoroughly sanitized and approved language based on popular "racial science" of Adolf Hitler and his "experts", so as to help Katzmann advance his career.

== See also ==
- Jäger Report, 1941
- Einsatzgruppen reports, 1941–1942
- Wilhelm Cornides Report, 1942
- Wannsee Conference, 1942
- Korherr Report, 1943
- Gerstein Report, 1945
- Riegner Telegram, 1942
- Höfle Telegram, 1943
- Bibliography of the Holocaust § Primary Sources
