= Franz Heim =

Nazi German SS Officer

Franz Heim (Frankfurt am Main, 13 February 1907 – 19 February 1944), was a Nazi German SS officer best known as the recipient of the Höfle telegram, an important piece of evidence regarding the Holocaust.

== SS Career ==
Heim was a member of the Schutzstaffel (no. 18,376), and the Nazi Party (no. 352,548).

From September 1941 he was Deputy Commander of the Sicherheitspolizei (SIPO) and the Sicherheitsdienst (SD) in the General Government (occupied Poland), under SS-Oberführer Eberhard Schöngarth in Kraków (Cracow).

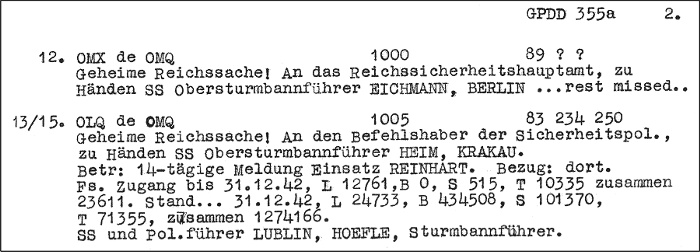
Höfle Telegram from deputy commander of Aktion Reinhard, Hermann Höfle, 15 January 1943 listing number of arrivals in four extermination camps, 1942 total: 1,274,166 Jews

Heim was promoted on 1 May 1943, to Standartenführer.

== Recipient of the Höfle Telegram ==
Heim was the listed recipient of the Höfle Telegram a report on Aktion Reinhard sent by radio by Sturmbannführer Hermann Höfle on 11 January 1943 reporting the progress of the operation.

The Höfle telegram confirmed that a total of 1,274,166 Jews had been murdered in the gas chambers of Aktion Reinhard's four extermination camps (Belzec, Treblinka, Sobibor and Majdanek) during 1942.
