= Hermann Höfle =

Austrian SS officer and war criminal (1911–1962)

- Höfle in 1961
- Born: Hermann Julius Höfle; 19 June 1911; Salzburg, Austria-Hungary
- Died: 21 August 1962 (aged 51); Vienna, Austria
- Military career
- Allegiance: Nazi Germany
- Branch: Schutzstaffel
- Service years: 1933–1945
- Rank: SS-Sturmbannführer
- Nickname: Hans
- Commands: Second in command for Operation Reinhard
- Awards: War Merit Cross 2nd Class With Swords
- Other work: Auto mechanic

Hermann Julius Höfle, also Hans (or) Hermann Hoefle (German: [ˈhɛʁman ˈhøːflə]; 19 June 1911 – 21 August 1962), was an Austrian-born SS commander and Holocaust perpetrator during the Nazi era.

Höfle was deputy to Odilo Globočnik during Aktion Reinhard, the extermination over two million Polish Jews, including the Jewish populations of Warsaw, Lublin, and Bialystok. On 11 January 1943, Höfle sent a message to SS-Obersturmbannführer Adolf Eichmann in Berlin that documented the total number of Jews killed in the four extermination camps during 1942 as 1,274,166.

Arrested in 1961, Höfle died via suicide by hanging in prison before he was tried for his crimes.

== Pre-World-War II ==
Born in Salzburg, Austria, Höfle joined the Nazi Party on 1 August 1933, with party number 307,469. He joined the Schutzstaffel (SS) at the same time. Before the war, he worked as an auto mechanic. Due to illegal political activities, he was imprisoned in Salzburg from 25 May 1935 to 1 January 1936.

== World War II ==
Photocopy of personal documents of Hermann Höfle, from his personal file, Berlin Document Center

After the conquest of Poland, Höfle served in Nowy Sącz, in Southern Poland. In November 1940 he served as an overseer of a Jewish labour camp southeast of Lublin. Up to December 1941 Höfle was in Mogilev.

=== Operation Reinhard ===
As chief of staff to Odilo Globočnik, Höfle was alongside Christian Wirth chiefly responsible for Operation Reinhard.

As head of the "Main Department" (Hauptabteilung), Höfle was responsible for organization, manpower, and coordinating the deportations of Jews from the General Government to the extermination camps of Majdanek, Belzec, Sobibor, and Treblinka. The deportation orders were coordinated from Höfle's office and channeled through the district SS and Police Leaders to the localities where they were to take place.

At the beginning of the operation, Höfle held the rank of Hauptsturmführer and lived and worked at the Operation Reinhard headquarters in Lublin.

==== Secrecy of Operation ====
SS members, including those from Action T4 who were assigned to Operation Reinhard, reported to the headquarters in Lublin and were instructed to their duties by Höfle. As such, he had them sign the following declaration of secrecy:

I have been thoroughly informed and instructed by SS Hauptsturmführer Höfle, as Commander of the main department of Einsatz Reinhard of the SS and Police Leader in the District of Lublin:

1. that I may not under any circumstances pass on any form of information, verbally or in writing, on the progress, procedure or incidents in the evacuation of Jews to any person outside the circle of Einsatz Reinhard staff;
2. that the process of the evacuation of Jews is a subject that comes under "Secret Reich Document," in accordance with censorship regulation Vershl V. a;...
4. that there is an absolute prohibition on photography in the camps of Einsatz Reinhard;...

I am familiar with the above regulations and laws and am aware of the responsibilities imposed upon me by the task with which I have been entrusted. I promise to observe them to the best of my knowledge and conscience. I am aware that the obligation to maintain secrecy continues even after I have left the Service.

— From: Yitzhak Arad, Belzec, Sobibor, Treblinka.

==== Trawniki ====
Höfle was the first commandant of the Trawniki camp during its early months. When he assumed command Trawniki was a holding facility for Soviet prisoners and refugees, but in September 1941 the camp was transformed into a training facility for the collaborationist Schutzmannschaft forces. Globočnik relieved Höfle in October 1941 and replaced him with Karl Streibel, under whose command Trawniki became a concentration camp.

==== Substitution policy ====
Around May 1942 in the General Government, a substitution policy developed for a short time in which Polish workers who were sent to the German Reich were gradually replaced with Jewish laborers. It became standard procedure to stop deportation trains from the Reich and Slovakia in Lublin in order to select able-bodied Jews for work in the General Government, the others being sent on to their deaths in Belzec. In this way, many Jews were temporarily spared death and instead carried out forced labor. Höfle was one of the chief supporters and implementers of this policy.

==== Grossaktion Warsaw ====
Höfle personally oversaw the deportation of the Warsaw Ghetto, the so-called Großaktion Warschau. The operation was preceded on 20 and 21 July 1942 by a spree of randomly killing actions along the streets of the Ghetto and by the arrest and brutal imprisonment of many others taken as hostages among counselors, department managers and those connected in a way or another to the Judenrat. All this was to intimidate and soften the Judenrat to the new upcoming measures.

The day after, in the morning of 22 July, Sturmbannführer Höfle, accompanied by an entourage of SS and government officials, arrived at the Judenrat in the Warsaw Ghetto and announced to the chairman, Adam Czerniaków, that the Jews, regardless of sex or age and with but a few exceptions, were to be evacuated to the East. The exceptions were workers in German factories who had valid work permits, Judenrat employees, the Jewish Ghetto Police, hospital patients and employees, and the families of the exempt. The deportees were allowed to carry with them 15 kg of baggage, food for three days, money, gold, and other valuables. The order also called for 6,000 Jews to report to the Umschlagplatz every day by 4 p.m. to board the trains for deportation.

Adam Czerniaków wrote in his diary on 22 July 1942, the day before he died by suicide:

Sturmbannführer Höfle (who is in charge of the evacuation) asked me into his office and informed me that for the time being my wife was free, but if the deportation were impeded in any way, she would be the first one to be shot as a hostage.

— From: Yitzhak Arad, Belzec, Sobibor, Treblinka

==== Höfle Telegram ====
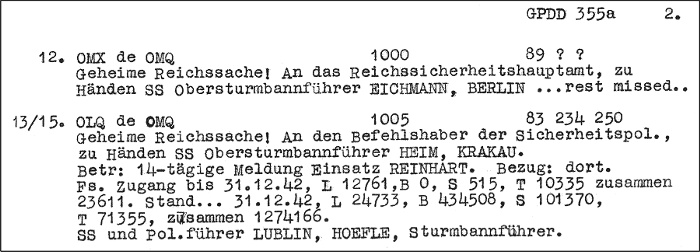
Telegram from Hermann Höfle listing the number of deaths in the extermination camps during a 14-day period in 1942 and for the whole year 1942 (1,274,166). (L) stands for Lublin/Majdanek, (B) for Bełżec, (S) for Sobibor and (T) for Treblinka extermination camp.

On 11 January 1943, Höfle sent a radiogram from Lublin to Obersturmbannführer Franz Heim in Kraków, who was at the time the deputy commander of the Security Police and SD in the General Government, and to Obersturmbannführer Adolf Eichmann in Berlin. The message documented the total number of Jews killed in the four Operation Reinhard camps through 31 of December 1942 as 1,274,166.

==== Final Phase ====
The final phase of Operation Reinhard was the exploitation of the property of the murdered Jews. In April 1943, Globočnik made Höfle responsible for property taken from the Jews who had died, other than valuables. These items were sent from the four death camps to a storage facility in Lublin and distributed from there.

=== Operation Harvest Festival ===
Höfle also played a key role in the Operation Harvest Festival massacre of Jewish inmates of the various labour camps in the Lublin district in early November 1943. Approximately 43,000 Jews were murdered during this operation which was the single largest German massacre of Jews in the entire war.

=== Later Activities ===
Höfle rejoined Globočnik in Trieste, after various missions in the Netherlands and Belgium.

=== Personal ===
In early 1943, Höfle's infant twins died of diphtheria. According to the commander of the Lublin Security Police, Johannes Müller, Höfle regarded this as divine punishment for his crimes.

== After the war ==
On 31 May 1945 Höfle was found by the British hiding in Möslacher Alm near the Weissensee Lake in Carinthia, Southern Austria, along with Gruppenführer Odilo Globocnik and Sturmbannführers Ernst Lerch and Georg Michalsen. After two years in Camp 373, a British interrogation center near Wolfsberg, he was released to the Austrian judicial system. On 30 October 1947, under oath, he was released to continue his earlier occupation as an auto mechanic in his birthplace, Salzburg.

After an extradition request on 9 July 1948 by the Polish government, Höfle fled to Italy, where he lived under a false name until 1951, when he returned to Austria and then West Germany, where for five months in 1954 he was a paid informant for US Army Counterintelligence (CIC), reporting on the activities of former SS men and the extreme-right in southern West Germany. The CIC was aware of Höfle's SS background but did not investigate his claim that he had taken part in "security work in Poland" during the war.

== Arrest and suicide ==
On 2 January 1961, Höfle was arrested by the Austrian authorities and sent to prison in Vienna, where in 1962 he hanged himself before his trial could begin.

== See also ==
- List of people who died by suicide by hanging

== Literature ==
- Arad, Yitzhak (1987). Belzec, Sobibor, Treblinka: The Operation Reinhard Death Camps. Bloomington: Indiana University Press. ISBN 978-0253113696. 1999 edition in Google book.
- Browning, Christopher R. (2000). "Chapter 3 - Jewish Workers in Poland: Self-Maintenance, Exploitation, Destruction". Nazi Policy, Jewish Workers, German Killers. Cambridge University Press. p. 74. ISBN 978-0521774901.
- Friedländer, Saul (2008). The Years of Extermination: Nazi Germany and the Jews, 1939-1945 (Reprinted ed.). New York City: Harper Perennial. ISBN 978-0060930486.
- Hilberg, Raul (1961). The Destruction of the European Jews. London: W.H. Allen.
- Klee, Ernst (2003). Das Personenlexikon zum Dritten Reich. Wer war was vor und nach 1945 [People Dictionary of the Third Reich. Who was what before and after 1945] (in German) (Second updated ed.). Frankfurt: S. Fischer. ISBN 978-3100393098.
- Reich-Ranicki, Marcel (January 2001). Mein Leben (in German) (2nd ed.). München (Germany): Deutscher Taschenbuch-Verlag. pp. 235–42. ISBN 3-423-12830-5.
- Peter Witte, Stephen Tyas: A New Document on the Deportation and Murder of Jews during "Einsatz Reinhardt" 1942. In: Holocaust and Genocide Studies 15 (2001), p. 468–486
- Josef Wulf: Das Dritte Reich und seine Vollstrecker. K. G. Saur Verlag KG, München 1978, ISBN 3-598-04603-0, p. 275–287
