= Sonderbehandlung =

Euphemism for mass murder used by Nazi functionaries

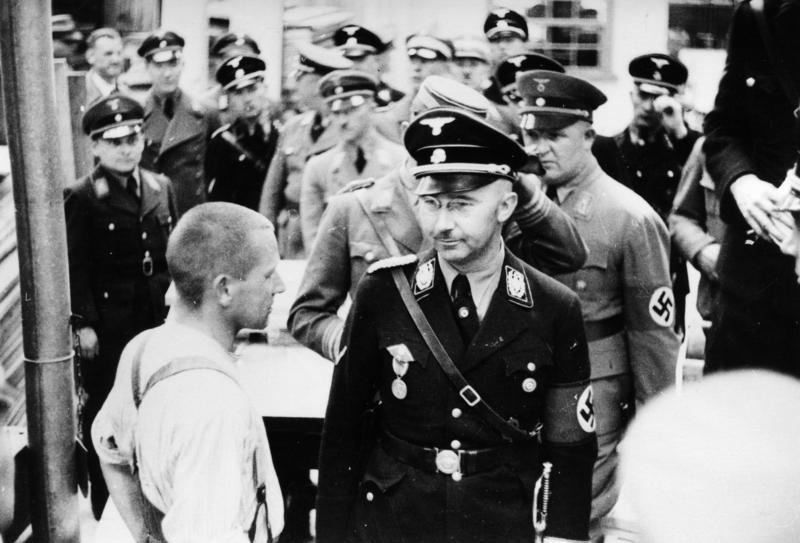
Himmler (front right, beside prisoner) while visiting the Dachau Concentration Camp in 1936

Sonderbehandlung (German: [ˈzɔndɐbəˌhandlʊŋ]), along with its abbreviation S.B., although literally meaning "special treatment" is best known as one of a number of euphemisms for mass murder and genocide used by Nazi functionaries and the SS.

The euphemism first came to prominence during Aktion T4, and was used during Action 14f13 and the Holocaust. The term was also used to imprecisely refer to the equipment used in these crimes, such as gas chambers and Zyklon B.

The true meaning of Sonderbehandlung was widely known in the SS, and in April 1943, Reichsführer-SS Heinrich Himmler was so concerned that it was a known euphemism that he ordered it replaced with the even vaguer durchgeschleust ("guided through" as in "guided through the camps").

Berel Lang states that disguised language was used "...not only in communications issued to the Jewish public when the intention of those issuing the communications was to deceive the Jews in order to minimize the likelihood of resistance, but also in addresses to the outside world and, perhaps more significantly, in internal communications as well, among officials who unquestionably knew (who were themselves sometimes responsible for) the linguistic substitutions stipulated by the language rules."

== Usage during Action T4 and Action 14f13 ==
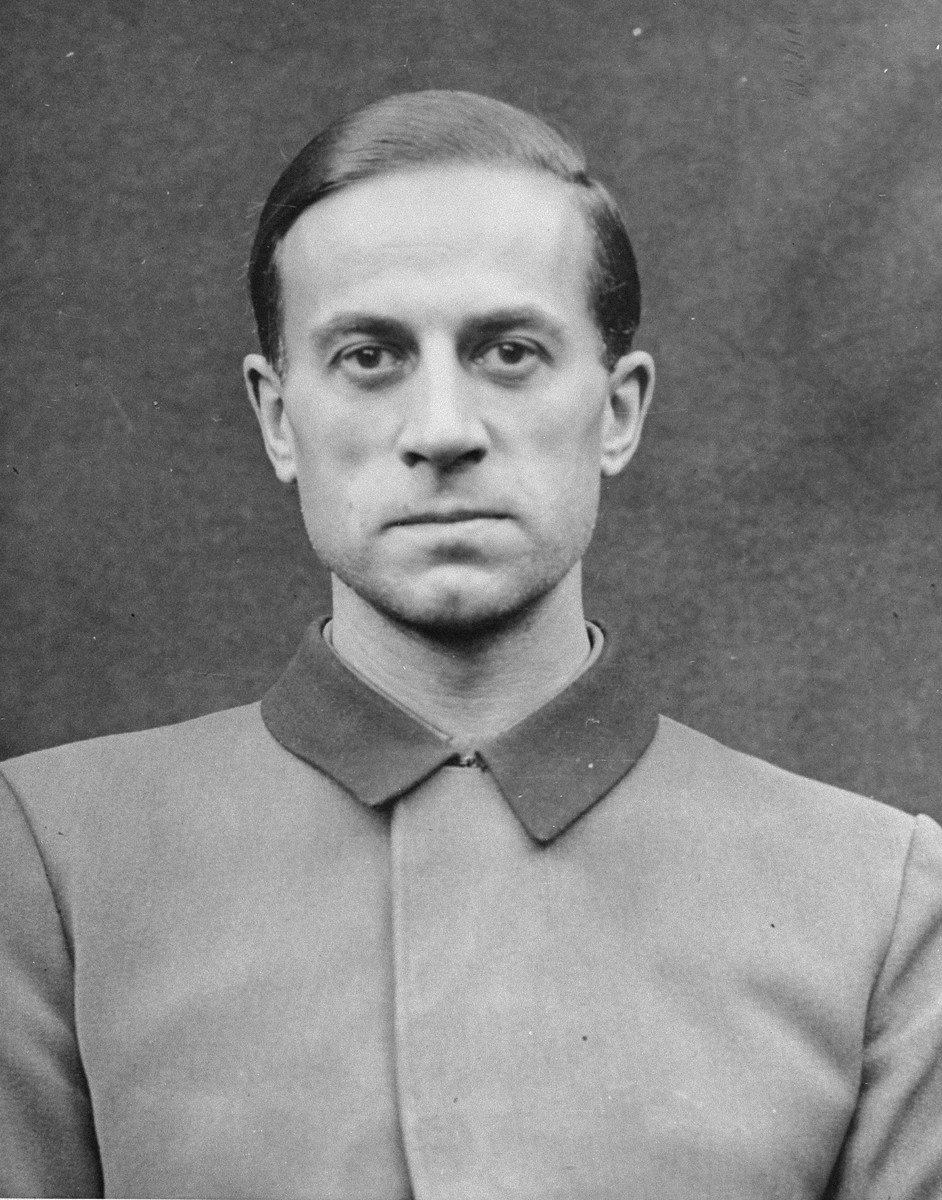
Dr. Karl Brandt, Hitler's personal physician and organiser of Action T4

By the summer of 1941, Action T4 became widespread public knowledge in Germany (and also in neutral countries and to Germany's enemies), and on August 24, 1941, Hitler ordered the joint chief of the operation Dr. Karl Brandt to halt it due to public protest; however, the operation continued, not only out of the public eye, but also in greater intensity. Hitler did not want to run the risk of an order publicly embarrassing him again and, as a result, the explicit order to carry out the Holocaust was given by him orally. Even if there had been any written instances of this order, they would have almost certainly been destroyed by the Nazis when they realised their defeat was inevitable.

== Usage by the SS ==
=== Degree authorising sonderbehandlung ===
Heydrich (left) with Karl Hermann Frank at Prague Castle in 1941

The term sonderbehandlung first appeared on September 20, 1939 in a decree by the Reich Security Main Office (RSHA) chief SS-Obergruppenführer Reinhard Heydrich to all state police departments:

To avoid any misunderstandings, please take note of the following: ...a distinction must be made between those who may be dealt with in the usual way and those who must be given special treatment. The latter case covers subjects who, due to their most objectionable nature, their dangerousness, or their ability to serve as tools of propaganda for the enemy, are suitable for elimination, without respect for persons, by merciless treatment (namely, by execution).

Heydrich used the term in the context of Germans in general rather than Jews specifically (the decree relates to "the principles of internal state security in the war"), nevertheless, it formalized the principle that the RSHA could extrajudicially kill anyone in their power.

=== Examples of sonderbehandlung meaning killing ===
The term sonderbehandlung was routinely used in RSHA correspondence. Sometimes the context makes it particularly clear that the meaning of the term is extrajudicial execution. For example:

- A memo from an RSHA meeting dated six days after Heydrich's decree includes sonderbehandlung with "execution" following it in brackets.
- A report from the Eastern Front dated October 25, 1941, states that "due to the grave danger of epidemic, the complete liquidation of Jews from the ghetto in Vitebsk was begun on October 8, 1941. The number of Jews to whom sonderbehandlung is to be applied is around 3,000."
- An excerpt of a decree dated February 20, 1942, written by Heinrich Himmler regarding the treatment of "foreign civilian workers" advises that in particularly difficult cases, application should be made to the RSHA for sonderbehandlung, adding that "sonderbehandlung takes place by hanging."
- In a letter to the RSHA, SS-Hauptsturmführer Heinz Trühe requests additional gas vans for "...a transport of Jews, which has to be given sonderbehandlung..." The gas vans were vehicles containing an airtight compartment in which the victims were locked and the exhaust gas was pumped into, killing the victims with the combined effects of carbon monoxide poisoning and suffocation.
- July 1941 instructions from the Gestapo discussing the killing of 'undesirables' removed from prisoner of war camps stated that: "Executions are not to be held in the camp... the prisoners are to be taken for sonderbehandlung, if possible, into the former Soviet-Russian territory."
- A document dated August 26, 1942 granted the Auschwitz camp authority to send a truck "... to Dessau to pick up material for sonderbehandlung..." - Dessau was one of two places where Zyklon B was manufactured.
- On September 8, 1943, 5,006 Jews were transferred from Theresienstadt to Auschwitz under the designation "SB six months." Six months later on March 9, 1944, those still alive were gassed.

=== Sensitivity ===
Heinrich Himmler became increasingly concerned about keeping the destruction of the Jews secret. On April 9, 1943, he wrote a letter to Heydrich's successor as chief of the Gestapo and SD, SS-Obergruppenführer Ernst Kaltenbrunner, concerning the Korherr Report. Himmler considered the report "well executed for purposes of camouflage and potentially useful for later times." The next day, SS-Obersturmbannführer Rudolf Brandt passed a message to the author of the report, Richard Korherr, stating:

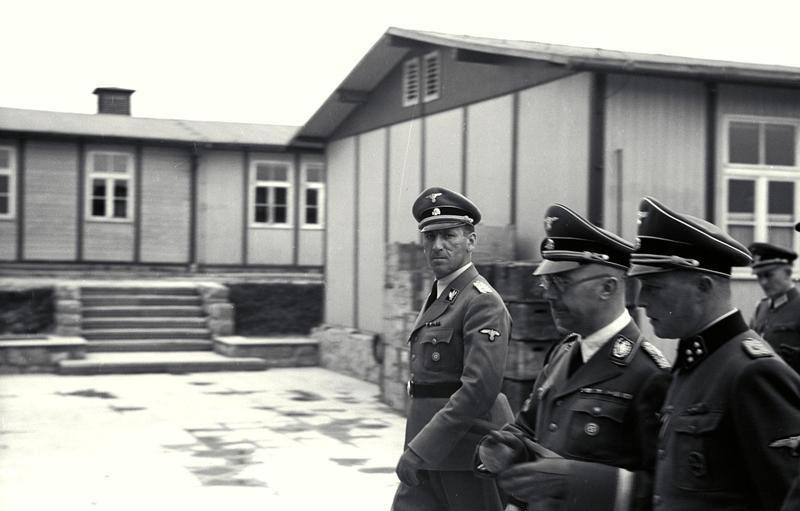
Kaltenbrunner with Himmler and Ziereis

The Reichsführer-SS has received your report on "The Final Solution of the European Jewish Question". He wishes that "special treatment of the Jews" not be mentioned anywhere. On page 9, it must be formulated as follows:

"They were guided:

through the camps in the General Government

through the camps in the Warthegau"

No other formulation is to be employed.

Himmler was so sure that almost everyone knew what "special treatment" meant, and ordered for it to be replaced with the even more vague 'durchgeschleust' ("guided through"), even though the document in question was top secret. The camps in question in the General Government were Treblinka, Sobibor and Belzec extermination camps, and Majdanek concentration camp. The only camp in the Warthegau was Chełmno extermination camp.

Similarly, in a letter dated January 29, 1943 by SS-Sturmbannführer Bischoff to SS-Oberführer Hans Kammler, Bischoff refers to basement morgue 1 of Crematorium II at Auschwitz as a 'Vergasungskeller', literally "gassing cellar". In the letter, the word is underlined, and at the top of the document is written: "SS-Untersturmführer Kirschnek!" meaning that Kirschneck should be informed of the failure to use the correct euphemism. Citing this unique letter, Robert Jan van Pelt states that in using "special action" or "special treatment" in place of extermination and killing, the first Holocaust deniers were the Nazis themselves, in that they attempted to deny to themselves what they were doing.

=== Attempts to remove references to Sonderbehandlung ===
In 1944, even as Hungarian Jews were being murdered en masse, references to Sonderbehandlung were being systematically removed from Auschwitz's files on the orders of the RSHA.

== Sonderbehandlung's meaning according to Nazi functionaries ==
Investigations and criminal proceedings regarding Nazi war crimes, showed that the functionaries involved had no doubt about the meaning of Sonderbehandlung.

=== Ernst Kaltenbrunner ===
During the Nuremberg trials, Ernst Kaltenbrunner, former leader of the Reich Security Main Office, when questioned about the meaning of Sonderbehandlung stated that it referred to:

...an order from Himmler — I am referring to Hitler’s order of 1941, therefore also an order from Hitler — that executions should be carried out without legal procedure.

=== Adolf Eichmann ===
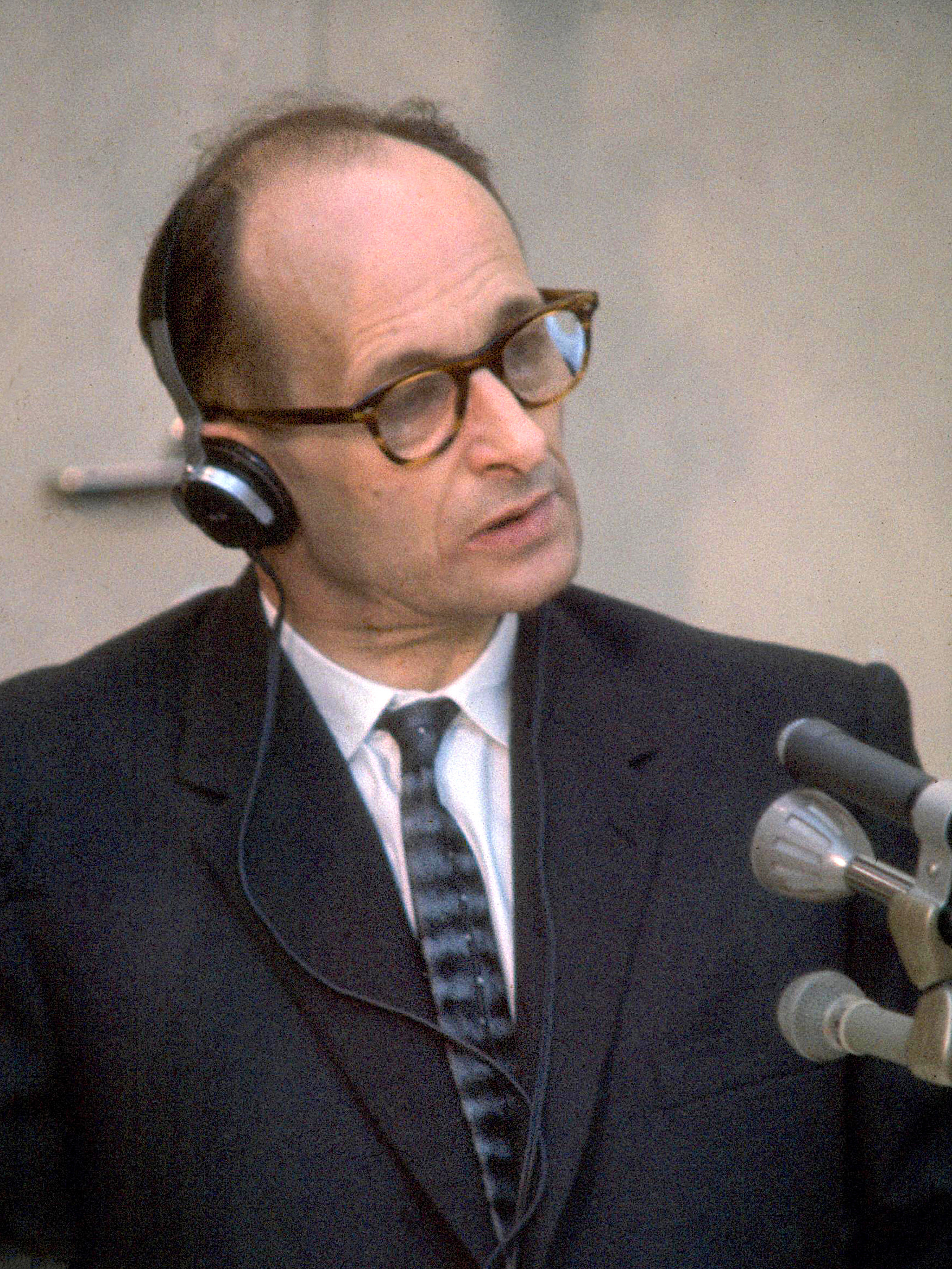
Adolf Eichmann on trial in 1961

At the trial of Adolf Eichmann, the former SS-Obersturmbannführer stated that "everybody knew" sonderbehandlung meant killing. However, he later claimed that it could also include measures besides killing:

Attorney General: All right, correct. That really is crystal clear. Krumey says that he is approaching you because it is a question of special treatment, and we already know, in fact, what special treatment is, do we not?

A. I would like to say the following about this. The term "special treatment" (Sonderbehandlung) has various meanings. As Poliakov says, in Poliakov - Black or Red - I can give the page number right away...I have it in my files somewhere...he reproduces forms. On these forms it says, "Re: Special Treatment" - first of all for Poles suitable for Germanization (eindeutschungsfaehig), and the same word, special treatment, is also for Poles not suitable for Germanization, that is those to be sent from the Eastern Occupied Territories to the Generalgouvernement. So that is one meaning of special treatment (Sonderbehandlung). Special Treatment also means - I want to say this here in this context as well, although I know that it is known - also means all transports of Jews, the deportation transports.

Q. And killing?

A. Yes, that as well, I must say that, too. The transports to the camps, the transports from the camps to the work sites, the transfers from camp to camp following the interests of the Economic-Administrative Head Office, the work inside the concentration camp - all of these concepts are covered by "special treatment."

In his memoir Götzen, written in prison, he further commented on the meanings of Sonderbehandlung, explaining that it had both a clearly lethal meaning as well as other possible ones and providing documentary examples for each meaning.

=== Emil Mazuw ===
According to SS-Obergruppenführer and senior SS and Police Leader Emil Mazuw:

During the war, the SS gave no meaning to Sonderbehandlung other than killing. I am certain that high-ranking officers knew it. I don't know whether the ordinary SS man did or not. According to the terminology used at the time, I understand 'special treatment' to mean only killing and nothing else.

=== Hans Münch ===
Hans Münch, a former Waffen-SS physician who had worked at Auschwitz, was asked in a televised interview in 1981 what the meaning of "special treatment" was. He replied:

"Special treatment" in the terminology of the concentration camp means physical extermination. If it was a question of more than a few people, where nothing else than gassing them was worthwhile, they were gassed.

=== Robert Mulka ===
Robert Mulka was adjutant to the commandant of Auschwitz, SS-Obersturmbannführer Rudolf Höss. During the Frankfurt Auschwitz trials he was asked what his understanding of Sonderbehandlung was, to which he replied:

Special treatment was murder, and I was deeply incensed.

=== Erwin von Lahousen ===
Erwin von Lahousen, an Abwehr official, gave evidence at the Nuremberg Trials regarding the removal of 'racial and political undesirables' from military prisoner of war camps for execution.

An agreement was concluded between the OKW, the Gestapo and the SD. Pursuant to this agreement Russian prisoners of war under the control of the OKW were delivered to the Gestapo and SD for execution. The term 'Sonderbehandlung' in the official documents and way of speaking of the SD was equivalent to 'condemned to death'.

== Other euphemisms employed ==
Sonderbehandlung was one of a number of euphemisms used by the perpetrators of the Holocaust.

Other euphemisms used to describe extermination operations included:

- 'Die Endlösung der Judenfrage' ("Final Solution to the Jewish Question" - the overall plan to exterminate the Jews of Europe).
- 'Desinfiziert' ("disinfected" – used by Action T4 doctors when gassing mentally ill and handicapped individuals.)
- 'Evakuierung' ("evacuation")
- 'Aussiedlung' ("expulsion")
- 'Umsiedlung nach dem Osten' ("resettlement to the East” - the transport of Jews to the camps)
- 'Auflockerung' ("thinning out" – as in the removal of inhabitants from a ghetto)
- 'Befriedungsaktion' ("pacification")
- 'Ausserordentliche Befriedungsaktion' or 'A.B. Aktion' ("special pacification")
- 'Abwanderung' ("having-been-migrated")
- 'Säuberung' ("cleansing")
- 'Sicherheitspolizeilich durchgearbeitet' ("directed" or "worked through" in a manner in accordance with the Sicherheitsdienst)
- 'Sonderunterbringung' ("special housing" – synonymous with Sonderbehandlung)

=== Equipment ===
As well as using euphemisms to disguise the killings themselves, the Nazis used euphemisms to refer to the equipment used to carry out the killings. Many use the prefix 'Sonder-', meaning "special", as in the German, it can be used to form compound nouns.

==== Sonderwagen ====
In his letter requesting additional gas vans, Trühe refers to the vans as 'S-wagen' ("S-vans"); 'Sonderwagen' ("special vans") in full. Other documented references include 'Sonderfahrzeug' ("special vehicle"), 'Spezialwagen' ("special van"), and 'Hilfsmittel' ("auxiliary equipment").

==== Sonderkeller ====
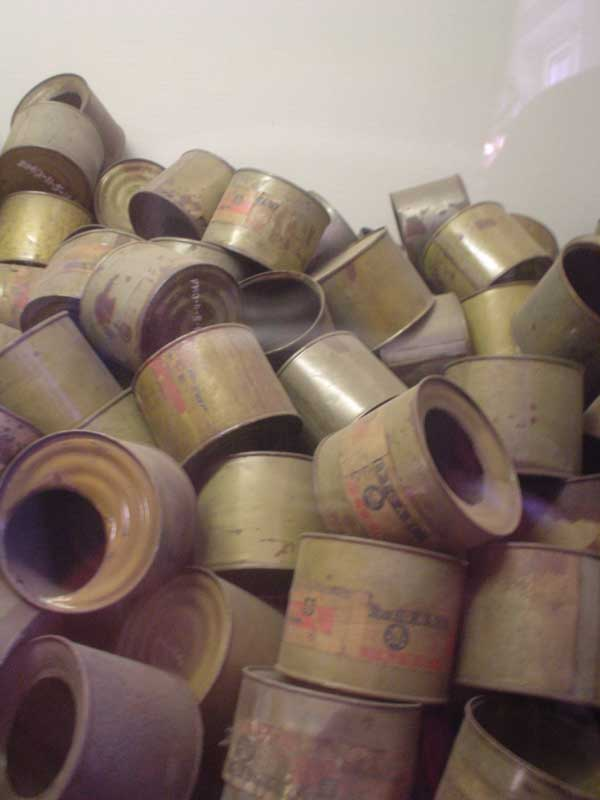
Empty Zyklon B canisters found by the Allies at Auschwitz-Birkenau in 1945

In a letter dated November 27, 1942 to chief Auschwitz architect SS-Sturmbannführer Karl Bischoff referred to the gas cellar in Auschwitz's Crematorium II as the "Sonderkeller" ("special cellar").

Several other euphemisms for gas chambers were used. For example:

- A letter dated August 21, 1942 referred to 'Bunker 1' and 'Bunker 2' (farmhouses west of Birkenau converted into gas chambers) as 'Badeanstalten für Sonderaktionen' ("bathing installations for special actions"). In the letter, this is given in quotes, further suggesting the euphemistic nature of what is meant.
- On blueprints, the basement gas chambers of Crematoria II and III were marked as 'Leichenkeller 1' ("basement morgue 1"), and the basement undressing rooms were marked as 'Leichenkeller 2'.
- A letter from SS-Sturmbannführer Rudolf Jährling concerning Crematoria II and III to oven builders J.A. Topf and Sons dated March 6, 1943, refers to morgue 2 as an "Auskleideraum" ('undressing room').

==== Gekrat ====
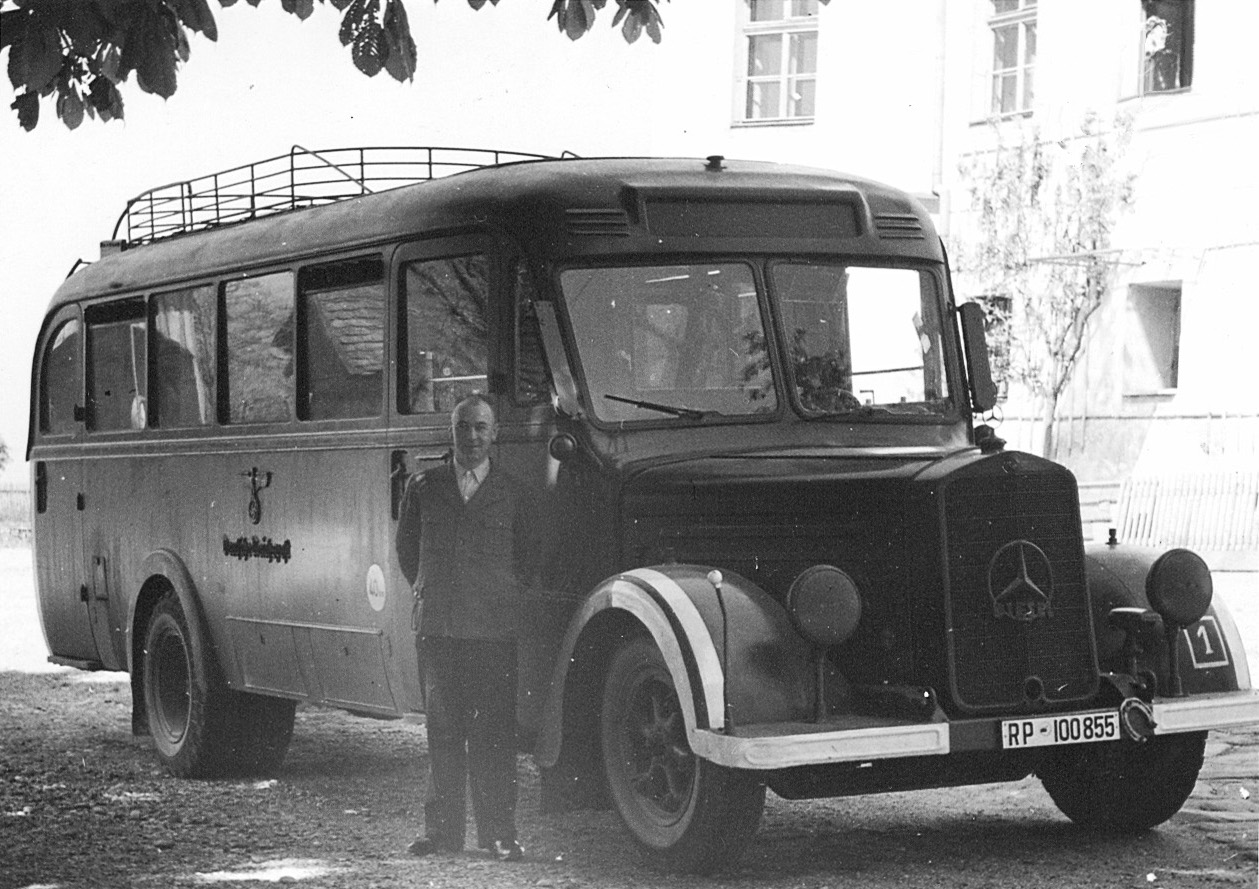
A so-called charitable ambulance Gekrat bus

The buses used to transport victims of Aktion T4 and Aktion 14f13 for involuntary euthanasia at centers such as Hartheim killing centre were given the euphemistic name Gemeinnützige Krankentransport (Charitable Ambulance), abbreviated as 'Gekrat'.

=== Sonderkommando ===
In another example of the use of 'sonder' to form a compound noun used as a euphemism, the units of prisoners forced to empty gas chambers and load bodies into ovens were known as Sonderkommando ("special squads"). Other euphemisms for these prisoners were Arbeitsjuden (Jews for work) and Hilflinge (helpers).

=== Sonderaktion ===
Sonderaktion ("special action") was a euphemistic term used for mass gassing. For example, the head of the WVHA Building Department, Hans Kammler, described the mass extermination of Jews from Hungary as the 'Sonderaktion "Ungarn-Program"' ('Special action "Hungarian programme"').

Similarly, a letter dated October 13, 1942, signed by Bischoff, states that construction of new crematoria facilities "... was necessary to start immediately in July 1942 because of the situation caused by the special actions."

In his diary SS-Obersturmführer and doctor Johann Kremer describes seeing a sonderaktion for the first time:

September 2, 1942: For the first time, at 3:00 A.M. outside, attended a special action. Dante's Inferno seems to me almost a comedy compared to this. They don't call Auschwitz the camp of annihilation for nothing!

Three days later, Kremer described the mass gassing of a group of exhausted, emaciated prisoners who the guards nicknamed "Musselmanner" (Muslims):

September 5, 1942: In the morning attended a special action from the women's concentration camp (Muslims); the most dreadful of horrors. Master-Sergeant Thilo (troop doctor) was right when he said to me that this is the anus mundi. In the evening towards 8:00 attended another special action from Holland [sic]. Because of the special rations (they get a fifth of a liter of schnapps, 5 cigarettes, 100 g salami, and bread) the men all clamor to take part in such actions. Today and tomorrow (Sunday) work.

=== Himmler's Posen speeches ===
The Posen speeches made by Heinrich Himmler in October 1943 are the first known documents in which a high-ranking member of the Nazi government spoke explicitly about the perpetration of the Holocaust during the war. Himmler mentions the "Judenevakuierung" or 'evacuation of the Jews', which he uses synonymously with their extermination.

At one point in the speech, Himmler says: "elimination of the Jews, extermination, we're doing it", briefly pausing in the middle of "elimination" ('Ausschaltung') before going on to say "extermination" ('Ausrottung'). His hesitation in the middle of saying "elimination" can be considered as a quick mental check to see whether or not it would have been acceptable to use such words in front of his given audience; however, as the speech was given to senior members of the SS in private, such language would have been acceptable to use.

This has been compared to another incident of self-verification in the opposite way, where Josef Goebbels, in his Total War speech on February 18, 1943, begins to say "Ausrottung des Judentums" ('extermination of Jewry') but switches to saying "Ausschaltung", bearing in mind that he is speaking very publicly. His resulting phrasing is "Ausrott... schaltung des Judentums", which can be likened to "exterm... elimination" in English.

== See also ==
- LTI – Lingua Tertii Imperii

== Bibliography ==
- Friedlander, Henry (1997). The Origins of Nazi Genocide: From Euthanasia to the Final Solution. University of North Carolina Press. ISBN 978-0-8078-4675-9
- Gutman, Yisrael; Berenbaum, Michael (editors). (1994) Anatomy of the Auschwitz Death Camp. Indiana University Press. ISBN 978-0-253-32684-3
- Kogon, Eugen; Langbein, Hermann. (1994) Nazi mass murder. Yale University Press ISBN 978-0-300-05441-5
- Lang, Berel (2003). Act and idea in the Nazi genocide. Syracuse University Press. ISBN 978-0-8156-2993-1
- Langbein, Hermann (2004). People in Auschwitz. University of North Carolina Press. ISBN 978-0-8078-2816-8
- Pressac, Jean-Claude (1989). Auschwitz: Technique and operation of the gas chambers. New York: Beate Klarsfeld Foundation
- Shermer, Michael; Grobman, Alex (2009). Denying history: who says the Holocaust never happened and why do they say it? University of California Press ISBN 978-0-520-26098-6
- Zimmerman, John C. (2000). Holocaust denial: demographics, testimonies, and ideologies. University Press of America. ISBN 978-0-7618-1821-2
