= Special Prosecution Book – Poland =

1937–1939 arrest list of Polish people prepared by Nazi Germany

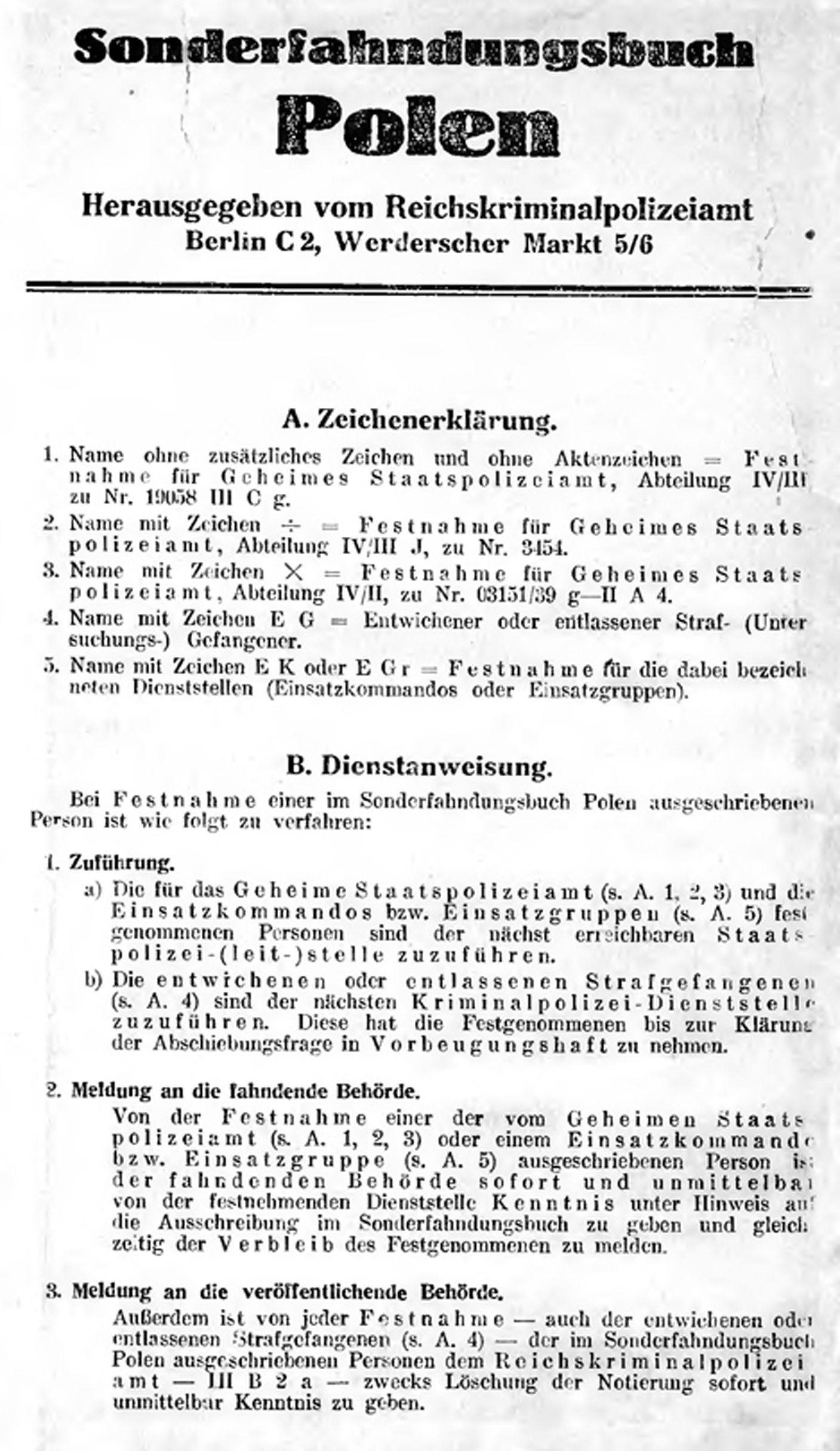
- Sonderfahndungsbuch Polen. symbols

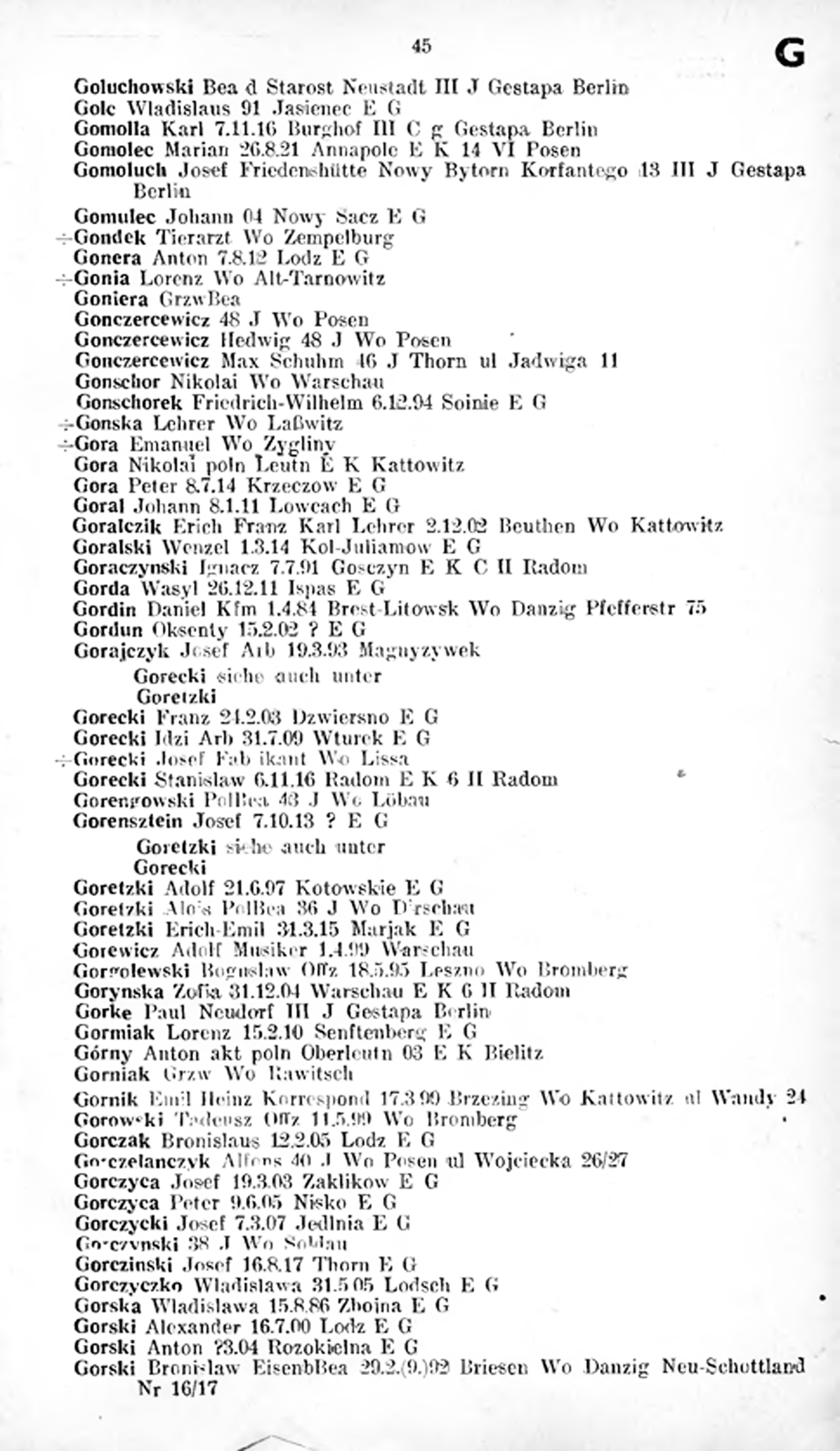
- Sonderfahndungsbuch Polen. Page with names under the letter "G" with abbreviations. EK stands for Einsatzkommando and EG represents an escaped prisoner.

Special Prosecution Book – Poland (German: Sonderfahndungsbuch Polen, Polish: Specjalna księga Polaków ściganych listem gończym) was a list prepared by Nazi Germany immediately before the invasion of Poland containing more than 61,000 members of Polish elites: activists, intelligentsia, scholars, actors, former officers, and prominent others. Upon identification, they were to be arrested and turned over to Nazi authorities following the invasion.

== History ==
For nearly two years before the invasion of Poland, between 1937 and 1939, the Sonderfahndungsbuch Polen was being secretly prepared in Germany. It was compiled by the "Zentralstelle IIP Polen" (Central Unit IIP-Poland) unit of the Gestapo from clandestine human intelligence supplied by members of the German minority in Poland involved in the Volksdeutscher Selbstschutz who acted as fifth column.

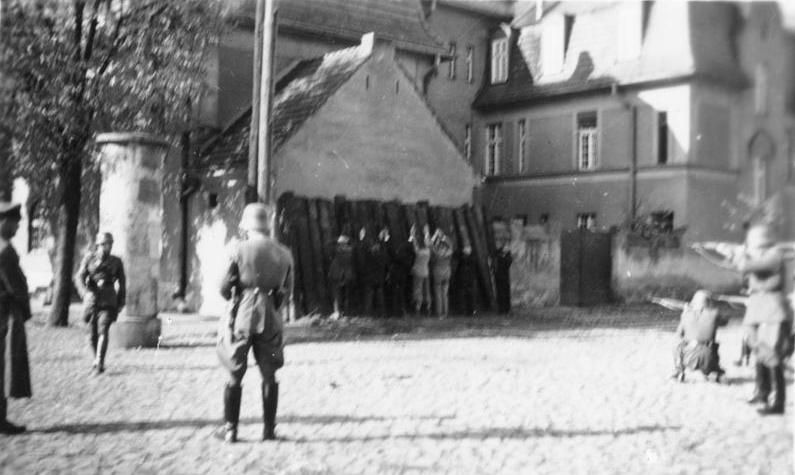
Execution of Poles in Kórnik by SS-Einsatzgruppe, 20 October 1939. Image from German Federal Archive

The Central Unit IIP-Poland was created by Reinhard Heydrich to co-ordinate the ethnic cleansing of all Poles in "Operation Tannenberg" and the Intelligenzaktion, two codenames for the extermination actions directed at the Polish people during the opening stages of World War II.

Formally, the Intelligenzaktion was a second phase of Operation Tannenberg (Unternehmen Tannenberg), conducted by Heydrich's Sonderreferat. It lasted until January 1940 as the first part of the Generalplan Ost. In Pomerania alone, 36,000–42,000 Poles, including children, had been murdered by the end of 1939.

The list identified more than 61,000 members of Polish elite: activists, intelligentsia, scholars, actors, former officers, Polish nobility, Catholic priests, university professors, teachers, doctors, lawyers and even a prominent sportsman who had represented Poland in the Berlin Olympics in 1936. People in the Special Prosecution Book were either murdered outright by the Einsatzgruppen or the Volksdeutscher Selbstschutz or sent to concentration camps and murdered there. The German death squads, including Einsatzkommando 16 and EK-Einmann, fell under direct command of SS-Sturmbannführer Rudolf Tröger, with overall command by Reinhard Heydrich.

The second and last edition of Sonderfahndungsbuch Polen was published in German and Polish in 1940 in occupied Kraków after the end of AB-Aktion (in German Ausserordentliche Befriedungsaktion). Later lists were published under the name of Fahndungsnachweis. Only a small number of people on both lists managed to survive the German occupation.

== See also ==
- Sonderfahndungsliste G.B. ("Special Search List Great Britain"), "The Black Book" of prominent residents of Britain.

== Bibliography ==
- Sonderfahndungsbuch Polen. Ergänzungsnachtrag über entwichene oder vorzeitig entlassene Straf... 1. Juni 1940, Krakau,
- Andrzej Leszek Szcześniak, Plan zagłady Słowian. Generalplan Ost, Polskie Wydawnictwo Encyklopedyczne PWE, Radom, 2001
- Fritz Arlt: Polen- Ukrainer-Judenpolitik im Generalgouvernement für die besetzten polnischen Gebiete 1939 bis 1940 in Oberschlesien 1941 bis 1943 und im Freiheitskampf der unterdrückten Ostvölker, Lindhorst, Wissenschaftlicher Buchdienst Taege, 1995
- Wacław Długoborski: Zweiter Weltkrieg und sozialer Wandel, Vandenhoeck & Ruprecht, Göttingen 1981, S. 309
