= Michael Thompson =

Michael or Mike Thompson may refer to:

== Arts and entertainment ==
- Michael Thompson (guitarist) (born 1954), American guitarist and songwriter
- Michael Thompson (horn player) (born 1954), British brass musician
- Michel Thompson (1921–2007), French painter
- Michael Thompson (photographer), American photographer
- Michael Thompson, American musician and touring member of the Eagles
- Doc Thompson (1969–2019), American talk radio host

== Politics ==
- Michael Thompson (Canadian politician) (first elected 2003), city Councillor in Toronto
- Michael C. Thompson, Oklahoma state cabinet member
- Mike Thompson (born 1951), United States Representative from California
- Mike Thompson (Kansas senator) (born 1957), state senator
- Mike Thompson, a member of the Kansas House of Representatives
- Mike Thompson (Oklahoma politician) (born 1976), state representative
- Mike Thompson (Mississippi politician) (born 1976), state senator

== Sports ==
=== Basketball ===
- Michael Thompson (basketball) (born 1989), American professional basketball player who has played overseas
- Mychal Thompson (born 1955), Bahamian sports announcer and former longtime NBA basketball player
- Mychel Thompson (born 1988), American basketball player who was briefly in the NBA

=== Other sports ===
- Michael Thompson (American football) (born 1977), former offensive tackle
- Michael Thompson (golfer) (born 1985), American golfer
- Michael Thompson (lacrosse) (born 1976), box lacrosse player
- Michael Thompson (karateka) (born 1962), English karateka and kickboxer
- Michael Thompson (sport shooter) (born 1956), American sports shooter
- Mike Thompson (2000s pitcher) (born 1980), Major League Baseball pitcher
- Mike Thompson (1970s pitcher) (1949–2022), Major League Baseball pitcher
- Mike Thompson (American football) (born 1971), former defensive tackle
- Mickey Thompson (1928–1988), American off-road racer
- Mike Thompson (umpire) (1877–1939), American football referee and baseball umpire

== Other ==
- Michael Thompson (academic) (born 1931), British academic
- Michael Thompson (philosopher) (born 1959), American philosopher
- Michael J. Thompson (born 1973), American political theorist
- J. Michael T. Thompson (born 1937), British applied mathematician
- Michael S. Thompson (born 1948), beekeeper in Chicago
- Mike Thompson, minor television series character, see list of Falling Skies characters

== See also ==
- Michael Thomson (disambiguation)
