= The Destruction of the European Jews =

1961 historical book by Raul Hilberg

- Cover of the 2005 edition
- Author: Raul Hilberg
- Subject: The Holocaust
- Published: 1961 (Quadrangle Books); 1985 (Holmes & Meier); 2003 (Yale University Press)
- Media type: Print (hardcover · paperback)
- Pages: 1,388
- ISBN: 978-0-300-09592-0

The Destruction of the European Jews is a 1961 book by historian Raul Hilberg. Hilberg revised his work in 1985, and it appeared in a new three-volume edition. It is largely held to be the first comprehensive historical study of the Holocaust. According to Holocaust historian, Michael R. Marrus (The Holocaust in History), until the book appeared, little information about the genocide of the Jews by Nazi Germany had "reached the wider public" in both the West and the East, and even in pertinent scholarly studies it was "scarcely mentioned or only mentioned in passing as one more atrocity in a particularly cruel war".

Hilberg's "landmark synthesis, based on a masterful reading of German documents", soon led to a massive array of writings and debates, both scholarly and popular, on the Holocaust. Two works which preceded Hilberg's by a decade, but remained little known in their time, were Léon Poliakov's Bréviaire de la haine (Harvest of Hate), published in 1951, and Gerald Reitlinger's The Final Solution, published in 1953.

Discussing the writing of Destruction in his autobiography, Hilberg wrote: "No literature could serve me as an example. The destruction of the Jews was an unprecedented occurrence, a primordial act that had not been imagined before it burst forth. The Germans had no model for their deed, and I did not have one for my narrative."

== Background ==
Hilberg began his study of the Holocaust, leading to The Destruction while stationed in Munich in 1948 for the U.S. Army's War Documentation Project. He proposed the idea for the work as a PhD. dissertation and was supported in this by his doctoral advisor, Columbia University professor Franz Neumann.

== Summary ==
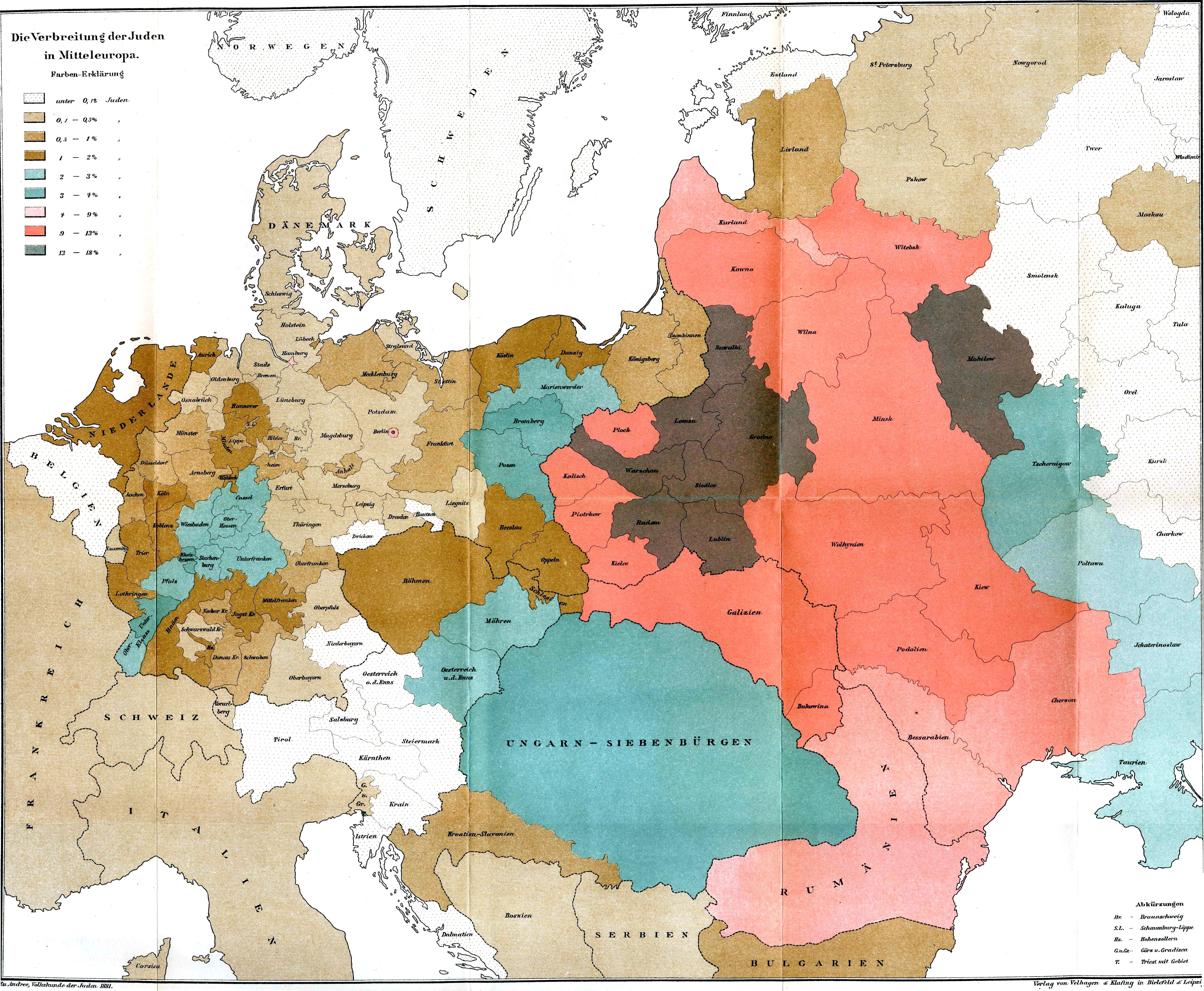
European Jewish population distribution, ca. 1881; percentage of Jews (in German)

Hilberg challenges the view that since the Nazis destroyed massive sets of sensitive documents pertaining to the Holocaust upon the arrival of Soviet and Western Allied troops, no truly comprehensive, verifiable historical reconstruction could be achieved. This, however, argues Hilberg, demonstrates an ignorance as to the structure and scope of the Nazi bureaucracy. While it is true that many sensitive documents were destroyed, the bureaucracy nonetheless was so immense and so dispersed, that most pertinent materials could be reconstructed either from copies or from a vast array of more peripheral ones.

From these documents, The Destruction proceeds to outline the treatment of the Jews by the Nazi State through a succession of very different stages, each one more extreme, more dehumanizing than that which preceded it, eventually leading to the final stage: the physical destruction of the European Jews.

In The Destruction, Hilberg established what today has become orthodoxy in Holocaust historiography: the increasingly intensifying historical stages leading to genocide. Nazi Germany's persecution of Jews, Hilberg argued, began relatively mildly through political-legal discrimination and the appropriation of Jewish assets (1933–1939). Ghettoization followed: the isolation of Jews in and their confinement to Ghettoes (1939–1941). The final stage, Hilberg concluded, was the destruction itself, the continental annihilation of European Jews (1941–1945).

In the early stages, Nazi policies targeting Jews (whether directly or through aryanization) treated them as sub-human, but with a right to live under such conditions that this status affords. In the later stages, policy was formulated to define the Jews as anti-human, with extermination being viewed as an increasingly urgent necessity. The growing Nazi momentum of destruction, began with the murdering of Jews in German and German-annexed and occupied countries, and then intensified into a search for Jews to either exterminate or use as forced labour from countries allied with Nazi Germany as well as neutral countries.

The more sophisticated and organized, less clandestine part of the Nazi machinery of destruction tended to murder Jews not fit for intense manual labour immediately; later in the destruction process, more and more Jews initially labelled productive were also murdered. Eventually, Nazi compulsion for the eradication of the Jews became total and absolute, with any potentially available Jews being actively sought solely for the purpose of destruction.

While these stages remained distinct, they transitioned fluidly into one another because of an escalating process of dehumanization. As demonized as the Jews were, it seems highly unlikely that the destruction process of the later stage could have taken place during the timeline of the stage which preceded it.

This dynamic reveals a spontaneity which many historians belonging to the functionalist school, following Hilberg's elaborate description, relied upon. These historians point to the more clandestine mass murder of Jews (principally in the East) and, as stated by notable functionalist, Martin Broszat, because "no general all encompassing directive for the extermination had existed."

Unlike many later scholars, The Destruction does not emphasize and focus on the role of Hitler. However, on this, Hilberg has shifted more towards the centre, with the third edition pointing at a less direct and systematic, more erratic and sporadic, but nonetheless pivotal, involvement by Hitler in his support for the destruction process.

Hitler was a crucial impetus for the genocide, Hilberg claims, but the role played by the organs of the State and the Nazi Party should not be understated. Hitler, therefore, intended to eradicate the Jews, an intent he sometimes phrased in concrete terms, but often this intent on the part of Hitler was interpreted by, rather than dictated to, those at the helm of the bureaucratic machinery of destruction which administered and carried out the genocide of the Jews.

Within a death toll often viewed as ranging from a low estimate of five million to a high estimate of seven million, Hilberg's own detailed breakdown in The Destruction reveals a total estimated death toll of 5.1 million Jews. Only for the death toll at Belzec does Hilberg provide a precise figure; all the others are rounded. When these rounding factors are taken into account, a range of 4.9 million to 5.4 million deaths emerges. In her 1975 book The War Against the Jews 1933–1945, Lucy Dawidowicz researched birth and death records in many cities of prewar Europe to come up with a death toll of 5,933,900 Jews.

It is instructive to note that the discrepancy in total figures among Holocaust researchers is often overshadowed by that between Soviet and Western scholarship. One striking example can be seen in the Auschwitz State Museum's significant reduction of the estimated death toll in Auschwitz. On May 12, 1945, a few months after the liberation of Auschwitz, a Soviet State Commission reported that no fewer than four million people were murdered there. Although few scholars west of the Iron Curtain accepted this report, this number was displayed on a plaque at the Auschwitz State Museum until the fall of communism in 1991, when it could be revised to 1.1 million. Hilberg's own original estimate for the death toll in Auschwitz was examined, although, Piper noted, this estimate fails to account for those not appearing in the records, especially those murdered immediately upon arrival. This extreme example does not, however, mean that the total death toll should be lowered by three million. Rather, the four million figure should be regarded as Soviet propaganda; following a correct distribution, the total death toll still amounts to conventionally held figures. The role played by The Destruction in shaping widely held views as to the distribution of and evidence for these, has for decades been, and arguably remains, almost canonical in Holocaust historiography.

== Publication ==
While the dissertation won a prize, Columbia University Press, Princeton University Press, Oklahoma University Press, as well as Yad Vashem all declined to publish it. It was eventually published by a small publishing company, Quadrangle Books. This first edition was published in an unusually small type. Much of the page count increase of later versions is due to being published in a conventional type size. This was not the end of Hilberg's publishing woes. It was not translated until 1982, when Ulf Wolter of the small leftist publishers Olle & Wolter in Berlin published a German translation. For this purpose the work was enlarged by about 15%, so that Hilberg spoke of a "second edition", "solid enough for the next century".

== Reception ==
=== Wide acclamation as seminal ===
Reviewing the book just after publication, Guggenheim Fellow Andreas Dorpalen wrote that Hilberg had "covered his topic with such thoroughness that his book will long remain a basic source of information on this tragic subject." Today, The Destruction has achieved a highly distinguished level of prestige amongst Holocaust historians. While its ideas have been modified (including by Hilberg himself) and criticized throughout four decades, few in the field dispute its being a monumental work, in both originality and scope. Reviewing the appreciably expanded 1,440-page second edition, Holocaust historian Christopher Browning noted that Hilberg "has improved a classic, not an easy task." And while Browning maintains that, with the exception of Hitler's role, there are no fundamental changes to the work's principal findings, he nevertheless states that:

If one measure of a book's greatness is its impact, a second is its longevity. For 25 years The Destruction has been recognized as the unsurpassed work in its field. While monographic studies of particular aspects of the Final Solution, utilizing archival sources and court records not available to Hilberg before 1961, have extended our knowledge in many areas, The Destruction of the European Jews still stands as the preeminent synthesis, the book that put it all together in the framework of an overarching and unified analysis.

The controversies surrounding Hilberg's book were perhaps the main reason why its Polish translation was released only after the collapse of the Soviet Union, five decades after its original publication. The year Hilberg died, he refused an offer to have a shortened version published in translation, insisting that particularly in Poland, where so much of the Holocaust took place, only the full text of his work would suffice. The complete three-volume edition translated by Jerzy Giebułtowski was released in Poland in 2013. Dariusz Libionka from IPN, who led the book launch seminars in various cities, noted that the stories of defiance so prevalent in Poland can no longer be told without his perspective which includes the viewpoint of Holocaust bureaucracy. Reportedly, the last document Hilberg signed before his death was the release form allowing for the use of the word annihilation (as opposed to destruction) in the Polish title.

=== Opposition from Hannah Arendt ===
In his autobiography, Hilberg reveals learning that Hannah Arendt advised Princeton University Press against publishing The Destruction. This may have been due to the first chapter, which she later described as "very terrible" and betraying little understanding of German history. She did, however, base her account of the Final Solution (in Eichmann in Jerusalem) on Hilberg's history, as well as sharing his controversial characterisation of the Judenrat. Hilberg strongly criticized Arendt's "banality of evil" thesis which appeared shortly after The Destruction, to be published with her articles for The New Yorker with respect to Adolf Eichmann's trial (Eichmann in Jerusalem). He still defended Arendt's right to have her views aired upon being condemned by the Anti-Defamation League. In fact, David Cesarani writes that Hilberg "defended her several arguments at a bitter debate organised by Dissent magazine which drew an audience of hundreds". In a letter to the German philosopher Karl Jaspers, Arendt went on to write that:

[Hilberg] is pretty stupid and crazy. He babbles now about a "death wish" of the Jews. His book is really excellent, but only because it is a simple report. A more general, introductory chapter is beneath a singed pig.

Hilberg also goes on to claim that Nora Levin heavily borrowed from The Destruction without acknowledgment in her 1968 The Holocaust: The Destruction of European Jewry, and that historian Lucy Davidowicz not only ignored The Destruction's findings in her 1975 The War against the Jews, 1933–1945 but also went on to exclude mention of him, along with a galaxy of other leading Holocaust scholars, in her 1981 historiographic work, The Holocaust and the Historians. "She wanted preeminence", Hilberg writes.

=== Opposition from Yad Vashem ===
Hilberg's work received a hostile reception from Yad Vashem, particularly over his treatment of Jewish resistance to the perpetrators of the Holocaust in the book's concluding chapter. Hilberg argued that "The reaction pattern of the Jews is characterized by almost complete lack of resistance. ... [T]he documentary evidence of Jewish resistance, overt or submerged, is very slight". Hilberg attributed this lack of resistance to the Jewish experience as a minority: "In exile, the Jews ... had learned that they could avert danger and survive destruction by placating and appeasing their enemies. ... Thus over a period of centuries the Jews had learned that in order to survive they had to restrain from resistance". Yad Vashem's scholars, including Josef Melkman and Nathan Eck, did not feel that Hilberg's characterizations of Jewish history were correct, but they also felt that by using Jewish history to explain the reaction of the Jewish community to the Holocaust, Hilberg was suggesting that some responsibility for the extent of the destruction fell on the Jews themselves, a position that they found unacceptable. The 1961 trial of Adolf Eichmann, and the subsequent publication by Hannah Arendt and Bruno Bettelheim of works that were more critical of Jewish actions during the Holocaust than Hilberg had been, inflamed the controversy. In 1967, Nathan Eck wrote a sharply critical review of Hilberg, Arendt, and Bettelheim's claims in Yad Vashem Studies, the organization's research journal, titled "Historical Research or Slander".

Hilberg eventually reached a reconciliation with Yad Vashem, and participated in international conferences organized by the institution in 1977 and 2004. In 2012 Yad Vashem held a symposium marking the translation of his book into Hebrew.

=== Against overstating the heroism of Jewish victims ===
A key reason as to why notable Jews and organizations were hostile to Hilberg's work was that The Destruction relied most of all on German documents, whereas Jewish accounts and sources were featured far less prominently. This, argued Hilberg's opponents, trivialized the suffering Jews endured under Nazism. For his part, Hilberg maintains that these sources simply could not have been central to a systematic, social-scientific reconstruction of the destruction process.

Another important factor for this hostility by many in the Jewish community (including some Holocaust survivors) is that Hilberg refused to view the vast majority of Jewish victims' "passivity" as a form of heroism or resistance (in contrast to those Jews who actively resisted, waging armed struggle against the Nazis). Equally controversially, he provided an analysis for this passivity in the context of Jewish history. The Jews, Hilberg argued, were convinced "the persecutor would not destroy what he could economically exploit." Hilberg calculated the economic value of Jewish slave labor to the Nazis as being several times the entire value of confiscated Jewish assets, and used this as evidence that the destruction of Jews continued irrespective of economic considerations. Additionally, Hilberg estimated the total number of Germans killed by Jews during World War II as less than 300, an estimate that is not conducive to an image of heroic struggle.

Hilberg, therefore, disagreed with what he termed a "campaign of exaltation", explains historian Mitchell Hart, and with Holocaust historians such as Martin Gilbert who argued that "[e]ven passivity was a form of resistance[,] to die with dignity was a form of resistance." According to Hilberg, his own approach was crucial for grasping the Nazi genocide of Jews as a process. Hart adds that:

This sort of "inflation of resistance" is dangerous because it suggests that the Jews truly did present the Nazis with some sort of "opposition" that was not just a horrible figment of their antisemitic imaginations.

=== The destruction of the Jews as a historically explicable event ===
This problem underscores a more fundamental question: whether the Holocaust can (or to what extent it should) be made explicable through a social-scientific, historical account. Speaking against what he terms a "quasi mystical association," historian Nicolas Kinloch writes that "with the publication of Raul Hilberg's monumental book," the subject had risen to be considered "an event requiring more, rather than less, stringent historical analysis." Citing Holocaust historian Yehuda Bauer's statement that "if the Holocaust was caused by humans, then it is as understandable as any other human event", Kinloch finally concludes that this "will itself help to make any repetition of the Nazi genocide less likely".

One danger, however, from this attempt to "demystify", argues Arno Lustiger, can lead to another mystification proffering "clichés about the behaviour of the doomed Jews [which depict] their alleged cowardliness, compliance, submission, collaboration and lack of passive or armed resistance". He goes on to echo the early critics of (the no longer marginalized) Hilberg, stating that: "it is about time to publish researched testimonies of the victims and survivors [as opposed to those] documentations and books, based solely on German documents."

=== Alleged mistakes ===
According to Henry Friedlander, Hilberg's 1961 and 1985 editions of Destruction mistakenly overlooked what Friedlander called "the most elaborate [Nazi] subterfuge" involving the disabled. This involved the collection of Jewish patients at various hospitals before being transported elsewhere and killed during the summer and autumn of 1940.

The destination officially provided for these transports was the Government General of Poland and, although they never reached Poland, fraudulent letters informed the relatives that they had died at the Chelm mental hospital in the Lublin region. This deception was so successful that it was not even uncovered at Nuremberg, was accepted by most postwar historians, and continues even today to mislead researchers. In fact, these Jewish patients, the first Jewish victims of Nazi genocide, were all murdered in the T4 killing centers located inside the borders of the German Reich.

Friedlander discusses this ruse in Chapter 13 of his Origins of Nazi Genocide (1995).

According to Lithuanian-American scholar Saulius Sužiedėlis, Hilberg misinterpreted a document regarding Algirdas Klimaitis, "a small-time journalist and killer shunned by even pro-Nazi Lithuanian elements and unknown to most Lithuanians". This resulted in Klimaitis being inadvertently "transformed into the head of the 'anti-Soviet partisans'".
