= The War Against the Jews =

1975 non-fiction book by Lucy Dawidowicz

- First edition
- Author: Lucy Dawidowicz
- Language: English
- Subject: The Holocaust
- Published: 1975 (Holt, Rinehart and Winston)
- ISBN: 0-03-013661-X

The War Against the Jews is a 1975 book by Lucy Dawidowicz. The book researches the Holocaust of the European Jewry during World War II.

The author contends that Adolf Hitler pursued his policies to eliminate Jewish populations throughout Europe even to the detriment of pragmatic wartime actions such as moving troops and securing supply lines.

As an example, Dawidowicz notes that Hitler delayed railcars providing supplies to front line troops in the Soviet Union so that Jews could be deported by rail from the USSR to death camps. She uses records of "one-way" rail tickets as additional documentation of those sent to camps.

Dawidowicz also draws a line of "anti-Semitic descent" from Martin Luther to Hitler, writing that both men were obsessed by the "demonologized universe" inhabited by Jews.

She contends that similarities between Luther's anti-Jewish writings, especially On the Jews and Their Lies, and modern antisemitism are no coincidence, because they derived from a common history of Jew-hatred, which she traces back to the biblical Haman's advice to Ahasuerus.

She argues that though modern antisemitism has its roots in German nationalism, the foundation of Christian antisemitism was laid by the Catholic Church and "upon which Luther built."

The book also provides detailed listings by country of the number of Jews killed in World War II. Dawidowicz researched birth and death records in many cities of prewar Europe to come up with a death toll of 5,933,900 Jews.

== Criticism by Raul Hilberg ==
Raul Hilberg, widely considered to be one of the world's preeminent Holocaust scholars, published his three-volume, 1,273-page magnum opus, The Destruction of the European Jews, in 1961; this work is regarded today as a seminal study of the Nazi Final Solution. Hilberg noted later that Dawidowicz not only ignored The Destruction's findings in The War Against the Jews, but also went on to exclude mention of him in her historiographic work, The Holocaust and the Historians, published in 1981.

Hilberg's work, running as it did against the grain of intentionalist thinking, was widely unpopular among many early scholars, a contrast to later views. It is argued that Davidowicz, a renowned intentionalist, simply ignored Hilberg's work in order to follow an academically safer path, avoiding controversy by avoiding functionalist conclusions like those drawn by Hilberg.

"She wanted preeminence," Hilberg writes. Within a death toll often viewed as ranging from a low estimate of five million to a high estimate of seven million, Hilberg's own detailed breakdown in The Destruction reveals a total estimated death toll of 5.1 million Jews.

== Jewish population listing ==
Dawidowicz's listing of Jews killed in World War II
| Country | Estimated Pre-War Jewish population | Estimated Jewish population killed | Percent killed |
|---|---|---|---|
| Poland | 3,300,000 | 3,000,000 | 91 |
| Baltic countries | 253,000 | 228,000 | 90 |
| Germany & Austria | 240,000 | 210,000 | 88 |
| Bohemia & Moravia | 90,000 | 80,000 | 89 |
| Slovakia | 90,000 | 75,000 | 83 |
| Greece | 70,000 | 54,000 | 77 |
| Netherlands | 140,000 | 105,000 | 75 |
| Hungary | 650,000 | 450,000 | 70 |
| Byelorussian SSR | 375,000 | 245,000 | 65 |
| Ukrainian SSR | 1,500,000 | 900,000 | 60 |
| Belgium | 65,000 | 40,000 | 60 |
| Yugoslavia | 43,000 | 26,000 | 60 |
| Romania | 600,000 | 300,000 | 50 |
| Norway | 1,800 | 900 | 50 |
| France | 350,000 | 90,000 | 26 |
| Bulgaria | 64,000 | 14,000 | 22 |
| Italy | 40,000 | 8,000 | 20 |
| Luxembourg | 5,000 | 1,000 | 20 |
| Russian SFSR | 975,000 | 107,000 | 11 |
| Denmark | 8,000 | 120 | 2 |
| Finland | 2,000 | ? | ? |
| Total | 8,861,800 | 5,933,900 | 67 |

== See also ==
- History of antisemitism
