= Final Solution =

Nazi plan for the genocide of Jews

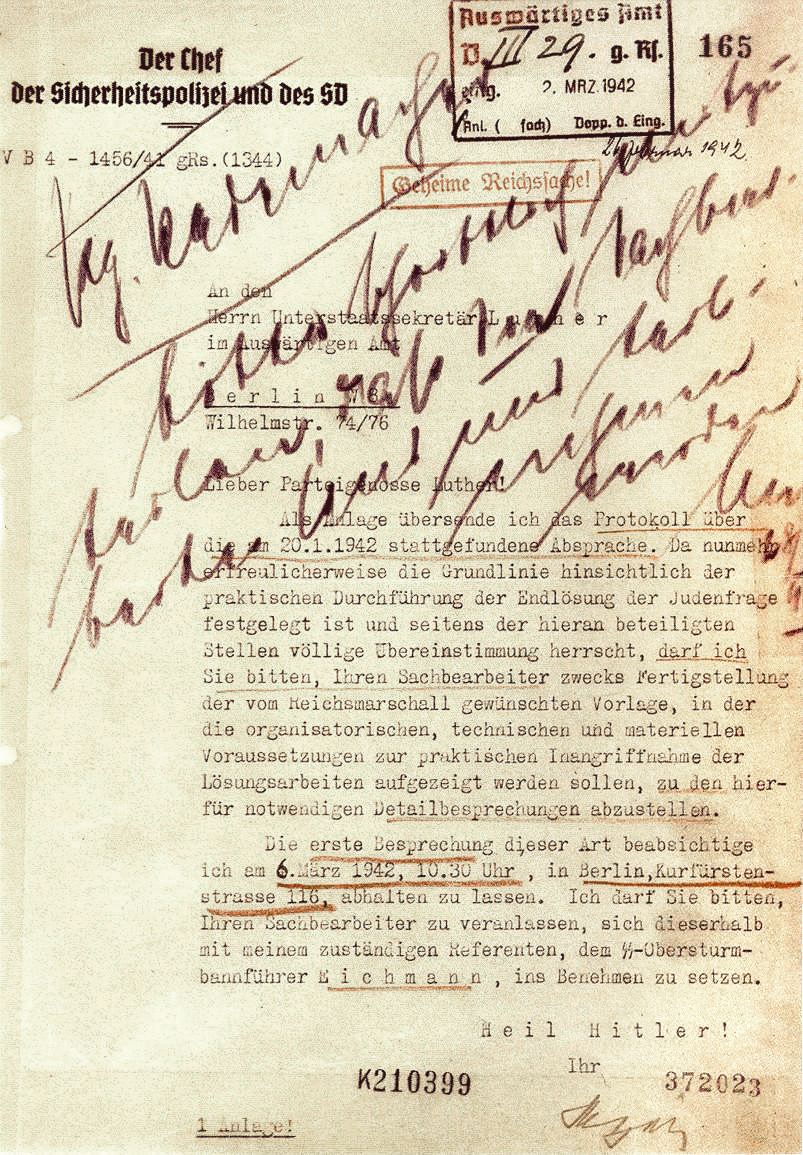
- Follow-up letter from Reinhard Heydrich to the German diplomat Martin Luther asking for administrative assistance in the implementation of the Final Solution, 26 February 1942
- Also known as: German: Endlösung der Judenfrage (lit. 'Final Solution to the Jewish Question')
- Location: German-occupied Europe
- Date: 1941–1945
- Incident type: Genocide
- Perpetrators: Adolf Hitler; Heinrich Himmler; Hermann Göring; Reinhard Heydrich; Adolf Eichmann; Nazi Germany
- Participants: Schutzstaffel (SS); Sicherheitspolizei (SiPo); Gestapo; Kriminalpolizei (Kripo); Sicherheitsdienst (SD); Ordnungspolizei (Orpo); Wehrmacht
- Camp: Extermination camps; Nazi concentration camps
- Ghetto: World War II Ghettos in Nazi-occupied Europe; Jewish ghettos in German-occupied Poland and the Soviet Union

The Final Solution (Note: German: die Endlösung [diː ˈʔɛntˌløːzʊŋ]) or the Final Solution to the Jewish Question (Note: German: Endlösung der Judenfrage [ˈɛntˌløːzʊŋ deːɐ̯ ˈjuːdn̩ˌfʁaːɡə]) was a plan orchestrated by Nazi Germany during World War II for the total extermination of people they defined as Jews. This secret policy of deliberate and systematic genocide across German-occupied Europe and all other areas that the Nazis controlled or influenced likely began in 1941, and was formally revealed to non-SS leaders of the German government at the Wannsee Conference in January 1942. It culminated in what is now known as the Holocaust—the murder of approximately 6 million Jews, (Note: Including thousands of Jews who were killed before the decision for systemic genocide was likely made, and hundreds of thousands after, but before the Wannsee Conference was held; around 1 million Jews had been murdered by the time of the conference.) including 90% of the Jews in Poland, two-thirds of all European Jews, and one-third of the total Jewish population of the world.

The "Final Solution" was a euphemism selected by the Nazis as code name for the murder of all Jews within their reach, a strategy the Nazis often employed to obfuscate their disreputable and/or criminal actions. Such euphemisms included the use of "resettlement in the East" to refer to the incarceration of Jews in concentration camps, and "special treatment" or "special handling" (Note: German: Sonderbehandlung) to refer to the murder of Jews.

The nature and timing of the decisions that led to the Final Solution is an intensely researched and debated aspect of the Holocaust. The program evolved during the first 25 months of war, leading to the final version of the plan: an attempt at "murdering every last Jew in the German grasp". Christopher Browning, a historian specializing in the Holocaust, wrote that most historians agree that the Final Solution cannot be attributed to a single decision made at one particular point in time. Rather, "it is generally accepted the decision-making process was prolonged and incremental."

In 1940, following the Fall of France, Adolf Eichmann devised the Madagascar Plan to move Europe's Jewish population to the French colony, but the plan was abandoned for logistical reasons, mainly the Allied naval blockade. There were also preliminary plans to deport Jews to Palestine and Siberia. Up until this point, thousands of Jews in ghettos, concentration camps, and otherwise under Nazi rule were killed through forced labor, random violence, starvation, and disease—though no plan to kill all Jews yet existed. Following Operation Barbarossa in 1941, the first phase of the systemic mass-murder of Jews began in the occupied eastern territories through the Einsatzgruppen mobile killing units, who rounded up Jews and killed them primarily through mass-shootings and gas vans. By the time of the Wannsee Conference in January 1942, approximately 1 million Jews had been murdered. In the second phase, which stretched across all of German-occupied Europe, Jews were sent on death trains to centralized extermination camps built for the purpose of systematic murder of Jews—primarily, though not exclusively, through gas chambers. The vast majority of victims were murdered in this phase.

== Background ==
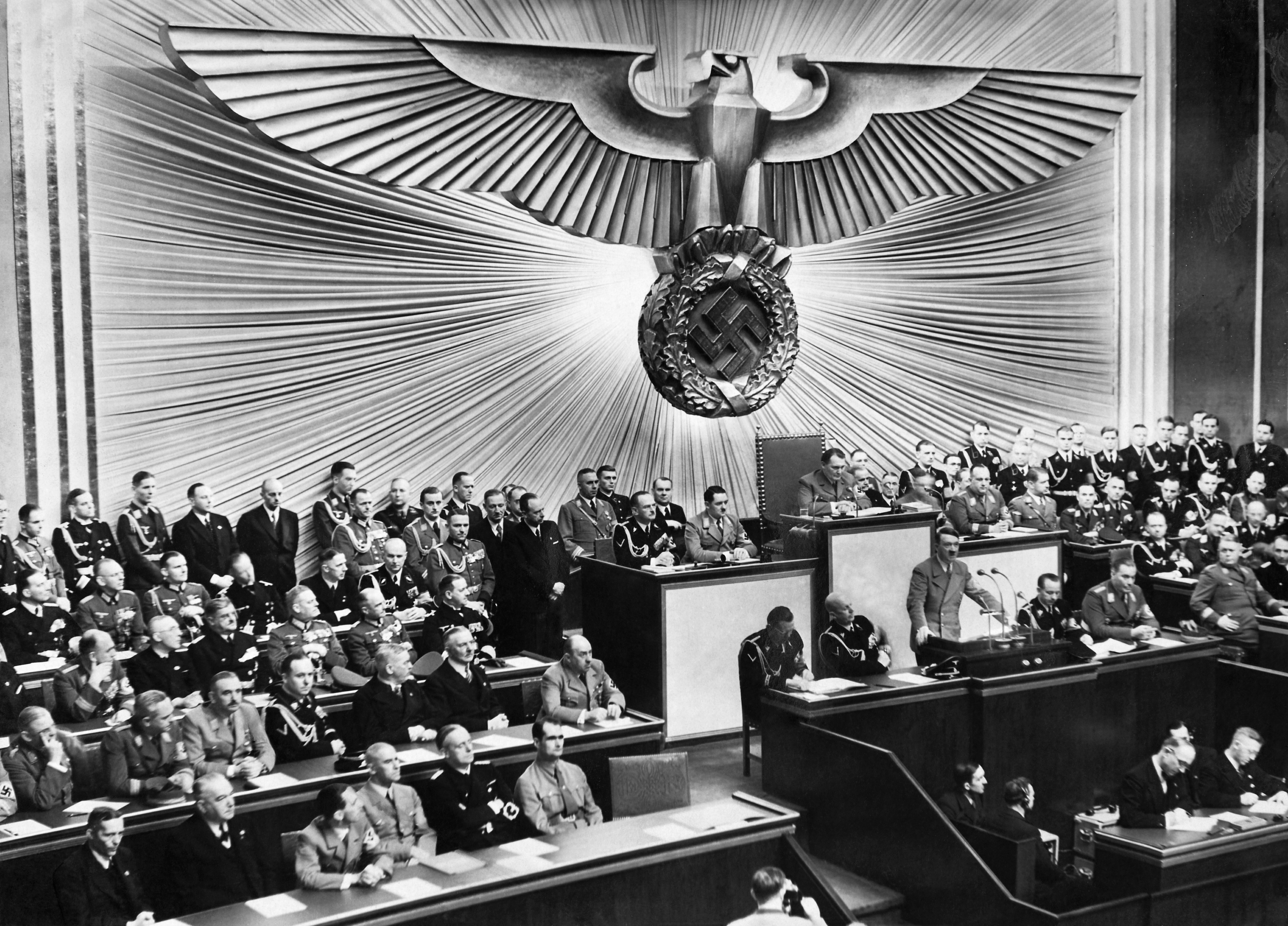
Hitler's prophecy speech in the Reichstag, 30 January 1939

The term "Final Solution" was a euphemism used by the Nazis to refer to their plan for the annihilation of the Jewish people. Euphemisms were the party's "normal mode of communicating about murder". However, Nazi leaders also made direct threats against Jews. For example, during his speech of 30 January 1939, Hitler threatened "the annihilation of the Jewish race in Europe".

From gaining power on 30 January 1933 until the outbreak of war on 1 September 1939, the Nazi persecution of the Jews in Germany was focused on intimidation, expropriating their money and property, and encouraging them to emigrate. According to the Nazi Party policy statement, Jews and the Romani people were the only "alien people in Europe". In 1936, the Bureau of Romani Affairs in Munich was renamed to the Center for Combating the Gypsy Menace. Introduced at the end of 1937, the "final solution of the Gypsy Question" entailed round-ups, expulsions, and incarceration of Romani in concentration camps built at, until this point, Dachau, Buchenwald, Flossenbürg, Mauthausen, Natzweiler, Ravensbruck, Taucha and Westerbork. After the Anschluss with Austria in 1938, Central Offices for Jewish Emigration were established in Vienna and Berlin to increase Jewish emigration, without covert plans for their forthcoming annihilation.

The outbreak of war and the invasion of Poland brought a population of 3.5 million Polish Jews under the control of the Nazi and Soviet security forces, and marked the start of the Holocaust in Poland. In the German-occupied zone of Poland, Jews were forced into hundreds of makeshift ghettos, pending other arrangements.

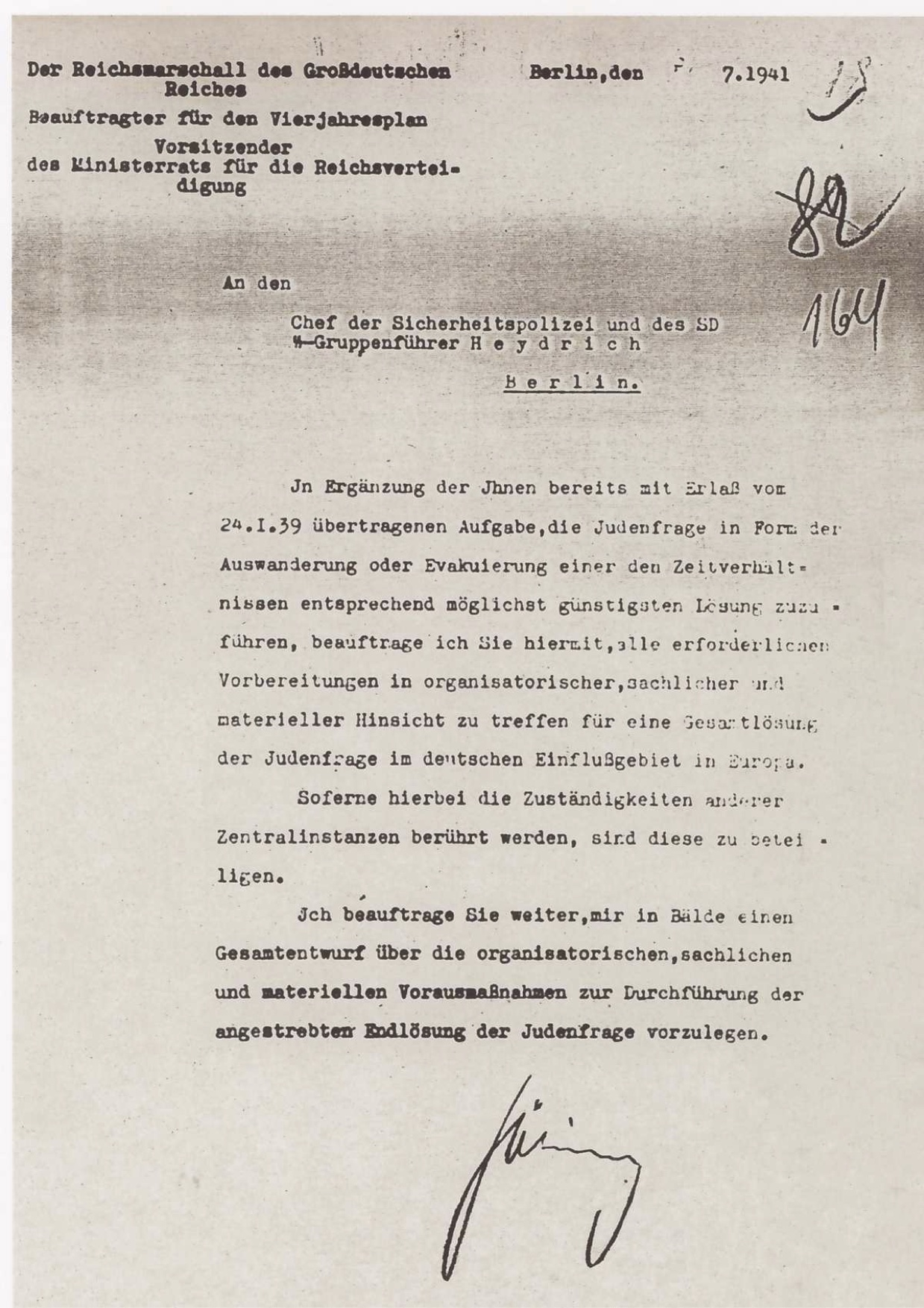
Letter from Göring to Heydrich, concerning the "total solution of the Jewish question"

In April 1941, the German agriculture and interior ministries designated the SS as an authorized applier of Zyklon B, which meant they were able to use this cyanide-based pesticide gas without any further training or governmental oversight. The launch of Operation Barbarossa on 22 June 1941 coincided with the German top echelon's newfound intent to pursue Hitler's new plan to eradicate, rather than expel, Jews. Hitler's earlier ideas about forcible removal of Jews from the German-controlled territories to achieve Lebensraum were abandoned after the failure of the air campaign against Britain and the Allied naval blockade of Germany. Reichsführer-SS Heinrich Himmler became the chief architect of a new plan, which came to be called The Final Solution to the Jewish question. On 31 July 1941, Reichsmarschall Hermann Göring wrote to Reinhard Heydrich (Himmler's deputy and chief of the RSHA), authorising him to make the "necessary preparations" for a "total solution of the Jewish question" and coordinate with all affected organizations. Göring also instructed Heydrich to submit concrete proposals for the implementation of the new projected goal.

Broadly speaking, the extermination of Jews was carried out in two major operations. With the onset of Operation Barbarossa, mobile killing units of the SS, the Einsatzgruppen, and Order Police battalions were dispatched to the occupied Soviet Union for the express purpose of murdering all Jews. During the early stages of the invasion, Himmler himself visited Białystok at the beginning of July 1941, and requested that, "as a matter of principle, any Jew" behind the German-Soviet frontier was to be "regarded as a partisan". His new orders gave the SS and police leaders full authority for the mass-murder behind the front lines. By August 1941, all Jewish men, women, and children were shot. In the second phase of annihilation, the Jewish inhabitants of central, western, and south-eastern Europe were transported by Holocaust trains to camps with newly built gassing facilities. Raul Hilberg wrote: "In essence, the killers of the occupied USSR moved to the victims, whereas outside this arena, the victims were brought to the killers. The two operations constitute an evolution not only chronologically, but also in complexity." Massacres of about one million Jews occurred before plans for the Final Solution were fully implemented in 1942, but it was only with the decision to annihilate the entire Jewish population that extermination camps such as Auschwitz II Birkenau and Treblinka were fitted with permanent gas chambers to murder large numbers of Jews in a relatively short period of time.

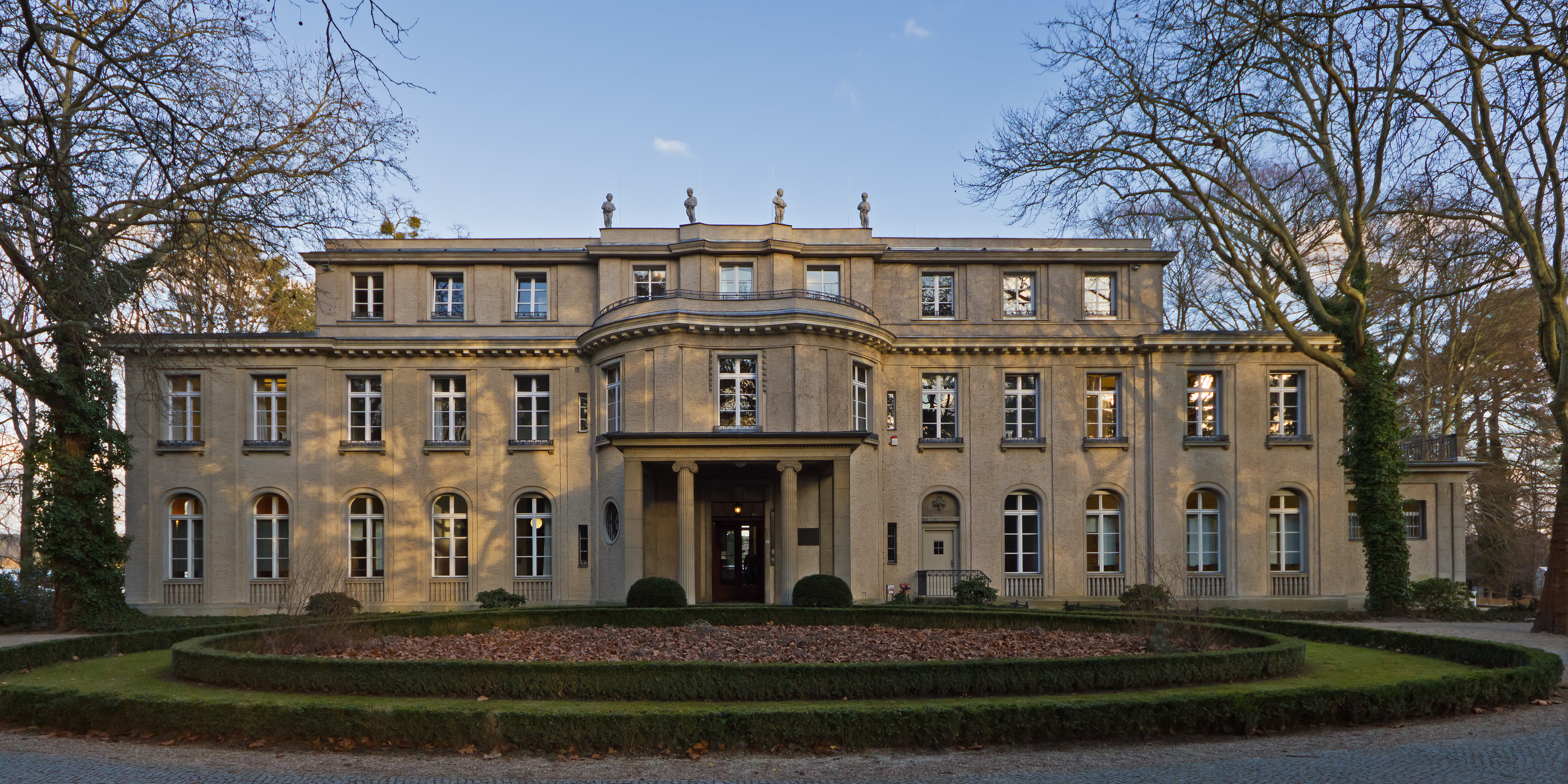
The villa at 56–58 Am Großen Wannsee, where the Wannsee Conference was held, is now a memorial and museum.

The plans to exterminate all the Jews of Europe were formalized at the Wannsee Conference, held at an SS guesthouse near Berlin, on 20 January 1942. The conference was chaired by Heydrich and attended by 15 senior officials of the Nazi Party and the German government. Most of those attending were representatives of the Interior Ministry, the Foreign Ministry, and the Justice Ministry, including Ministers for the Eastern Territories. At the conference, Heydrich indicated that approximately 11,000,000 Jews in Europe would fall under the provisions of the "Final Solution". This figure included not only Jews residing in Axis-controlled Europe, but also the Jewish populations of the United Kingdom and of neutral nations (Switzerland, Ireland, Sweden, Spain, Portugal, and European Turkey). Eichmann's biographer David Cesarani wrote that Heydrich's main purpose in convening the conference was to assert his authority over the various agencies dealing with Jewish issues. "The simplest, most decisive way that Heydrich could ensure the smooth flow of deportations" to death camps, according to Cesarani, "was by asserting his total control over the fate of the Jews in the Reich and the east" under the single authority of the RSHA. A copy of the minutes of this meeting (later called the Wannsee Conference Protocol) was found by the Allies in March 1947; it was too late to serve as evidence during the first Nuremberg Trial, but was used by prosecutor General Telford Taylor in the subsequent Nuremberg Trials.

After the end of World War II, surviving archival documents provided a clear record of the Final Solution policies and actions of Nazi Germany. They included the Wannsee Conference Protocol, which documented the co-operation of various German state agencies in the SS-led Holocaust, as well as some 3,000 tons of original German records captured by Allied armies, including the Einsatzgruppen reports, which documented the progress of the mobile killing units assigned, among other tasks, to murder Jewish civilians during the attack on the Soviet Union in 1941. The evidential proof which documented the mechanism of the Holocaust was submitted at Nuremberg.

== Phase one: death squads of Operation Barbarossa ==
The Nazi invasion of the Soviet Union codenamed Operation Barbarossa, which commenced on 22 June 1941, set in motion a "war of annihilation" which quickly opened the door to the systematic mass murder of European Jews. For Hitler, Bolshevism was merely "the most recent and most nefarious manifestation of the eternal Jewish threat". On 3 March 1941, Wehrmacht Joint Operations Staff Chief Alfred Jodl repeated Hitler's declaration that the "Jewish-Bolshevik intelligentsia would have to be eliminated" and that the forthcoming war would be a confrontation between two completely opposing cultures. In May 1941, Gestapo leader Heinrich Müller wrote a preamble to the new law limiting the jurisdiction of military courts in prosecuting troops for criminal actions because: "This time, the troops will encounter an especially dangerous element from the civilian population, and therefore, have the right and obligation to secure themselves."

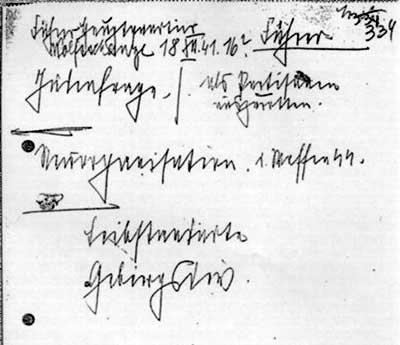
Himmler note 18 December 1941: 'als Partisanen auszurotten'

Himmler and Heydrich assembled a force of about 3,000 men from Security Police, Gestapo, Kripo, SD, and the Waffen-SS, as the so-called "special commandos of the security forces" known as the Einsatzgruppen, to eliminate both communists and Jews in occupied territories. These forces were supported by 21 battalions of Orpo Reserve Police under Kurt Daluege, adding up to 11,000 men. The explicit orders given to the Order Police varied between locations, but for Police Battalion 309 participating in the first mass murder of 5,500 Polish Jews in the Soviet-controlled Białystok (a Polish provincial capital), Major Weiss explained to his officers that Barbarossa is a war of annihilation against Bolshevism, and that his battalions would proceed ruthlessly against all Jews, regardless of age or sex.

After crossing the Soviet demarcation line in 1941, what had been regarded as exceptional in the Greater Germanic Reich became a normal way of operating in the east. The crucial taboo against the murder of women and children was breached not only in Białystok but also in Gargždai in late June. By July, significant numbers of women and children were being murdered behind all front-lines not only by the Germans but also by the local Ukrainian and Lithuanian auxiliary forces. On 29 July 1941, at a meeting of SS officers in Vileyka (Polish Wilejka, now Belarus), the Einsatzgruppen had been given a dressing-down for their low execution figures. Heydrich himself issued an order to include the Jewish women and children in all subsequent shooting operations. Accordingly, by the end of July the entire Jewish population of Vileyka, men, women and children, were murdered. Around 12 August, no less than two-thirds of the Jews shot in Surazh were women and children of all ages. In late August 1941 the Einsatzgruppen murdered 23,600 Jews in the Kamianets-Podilskyi massacre. A month later, the largest mass shooting of Soviet Jews took place on 29–30 September in the ravine of Babi Yar, near Kyiv, where more than 33,000 Jewish people of all ages were systematically machine-gunned. In mid-October 1941, HSSPF South, under the command of Friedrich Jeckeln, had reported the indiscriminate murder of more than 100,000 people.

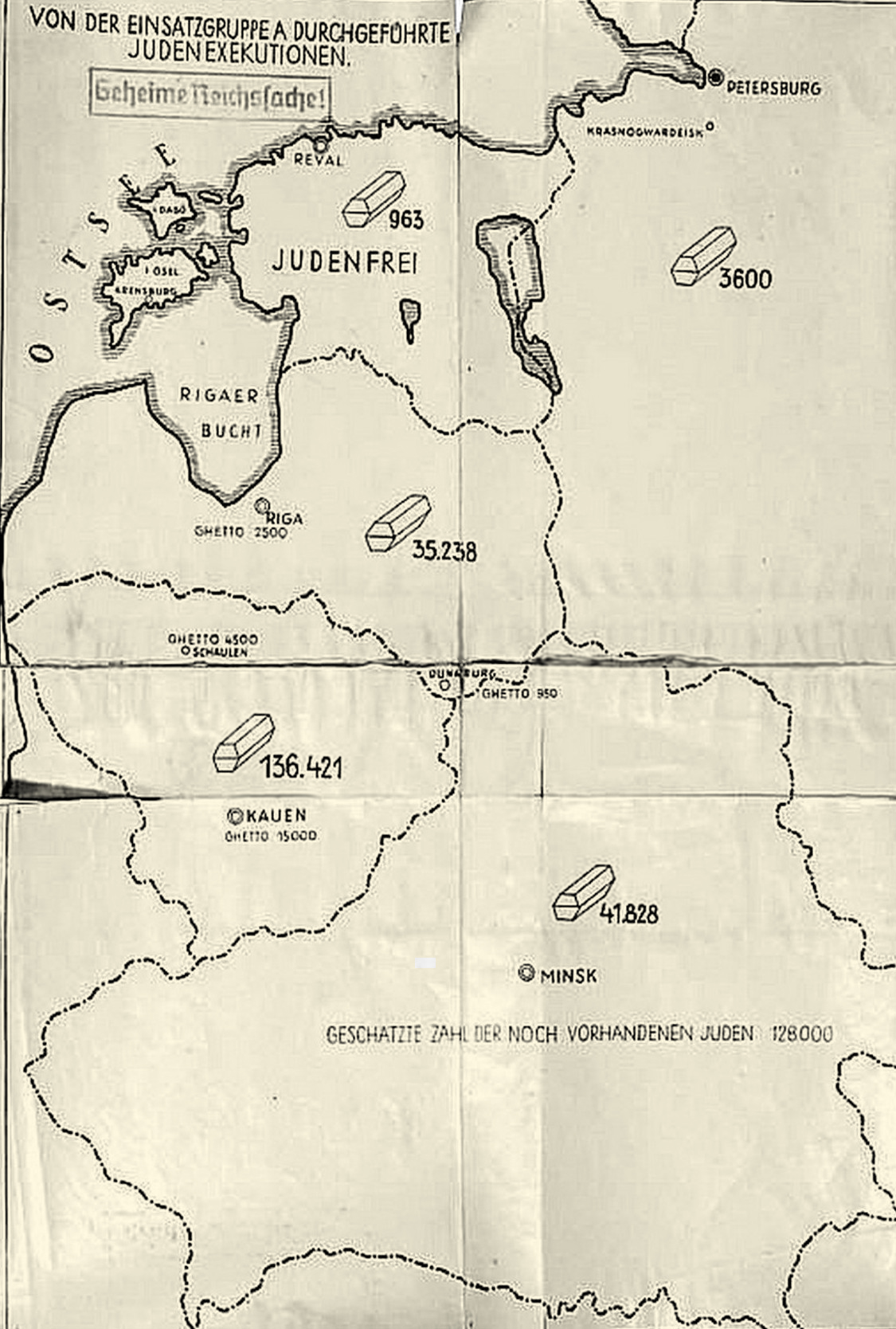
Original annotated map from Stahlecker's Report, summarizing murders committed by Einsatzgruppen in Estonia, Latvia, Lithuania, Belarus and Russia until January 1942

By the end of December 1941, before the Wannsee Conference, over 439,800 Jewish people had been murdered, and the Final Solution policy in the east became common knowledge within the SS. Entire regions were reported "free of Jews" by the Einsatzgruppen. Addressing his district governors in the General Government on 16 December 1941, Governor-General Hans Frank said: "But what will happen to the Jews? Do you believe they will be lodged in settlements in Ostland? In Berlin, we were told: why all this trouble; we cannot use them in the Ostland or the Reichskommissariat either; liquidate them yourselves!" Two days later, Himmler recorded the outcome of his discussion with Hitler. The result was: "als Partisanen auszurotten" ("exterminate them as partisans"). Israeli historian Yehuda Bauer wrote that the remark is probably as close as historians will ever get to a definitive order from Hitler for the genocide carried out during the Holocaust. Within two years, the total number of shooting victims in the east had risen to between 618,000 and 800,000 Jews.

=== Bezirk Bialystok and Reichskommissariat Ostland ===
Several scholars have suggested that the Final Solution began in the newly formed district of Bezirk Bialystok. The German army took over Białystok within days. On Friday, 27 June 1941, the Reserve Police Battalion 309 arrived in the city and set the Great Synagogue on fire with hundreds of Jewish men locked inside. The burning of the synagogue was followed by a frenzy of murders both inside the homes around the Jewish neighbourhood of Chanajki, and in the city park, lasting until night time. The next day, some 30 wagons of dead bodies were taken to mass graves. As noted by Browning, the murders were led by a commander "who correctly intuited and anticipated the wishes of his Führer" without direct orders. For reasons unknown, the number of victims in the official report by Major Weis was cut in half. The next mass-shooting of Polish Jews within the newly formed Reichskommissariat Ostland took place in two days of 5–7 August in occupied Pińsk, where over 12,000 Jews were murdered by the Waffen SS, not the Einsatzgruppen. An additional 17,000 Jews perished there in a ghetto uprising crushed a year later with the aid of Belarusian Auxiliary Police.

An Israeli historian Dina Porat claimed that the Final Solution, i.e.: "the systematic overall physical extermination of Jewish communities one after the other—began in Lithuania" during the massive German chase after the Red Army across the Reichskommissariat Ostland. The subject of the Holocaust in Lithuania has been analysed by Konrad Kweit from USHMM who wrote: "Lithuanian Jews were among the first victims of the Holocaust [beyond the eastern borders of occupied Poland]. The Germans carried out the mass executions [...] signaling the beginning of the 'Final Solution'." About 80,000 Jews were murdered in Lithuania by October (including in formerly Polish Wilno) and about 175,000 by the end of 1941 according to official reports.

=== Reichskommissariat Ukraine ===
Within one week from the start of Operation Barbarossa, Heydrich issued an order to his Einsatzgruppen for the on-the-spot execution of all Bolsheviks, interpreted by the SS to mean all Jews. One of the first indiscriminate massacres of men, women, and children in Reichskommissariat Ukraine took the lives of over 4,000 Polish Jews in occupied Łuck on 2–4 July 1941, murdered by Einsatzkommando 4a assisted by the Ukrainian People's Militia. Formed officially on 20 August 1941, the Reichskommissariat Ukraine—stretching from prewar east-central Poland to Crimea—had become operational theatre of the Einsatzgruppe C. Within the Soviet Union proper, between 9 July 1941 and 19 September 1941 the city of Zhytomyr was made Judenfrei in three murder operations conducted by German and Ukrainian police in which 10,000 Jews perished. In the Kamianets-Podilskyi massacre of 26–28 August 1941 some 23,600 Jews were shot in front of open pits (including 14,000–18,000 people expelled from Hungary). After an incident in Bila Tserkva in which 90 small children left behind had to be shot separately, Blobel requested that Jewish mothers hold them in their arms during mass shootings. Long before the conference at Wannsee, 28,000 Jews were shot by SS and Ukrainian military in Vinnytsia on 22 September 1941, followed by the 29 September massacre of 33,771 Jews at Babi Yar. In Dnipropetrovsk, on 13 October 1941 some 10,000–15,000 Jews were shot. In Chernihiv, 10,000 Jews were murdered and only 260 Jews were spared. In mid-October, during the Krivoy-Rog massacre of 4,000–5,000 Soviet Jews the entire Ukrainian auxiliary police force actively participated. In the first days of January 1942 in Kharkiv, 12,000 Jews were murdered, but smaller massacres continued in this period on daily basis in countless other locations. In August 1942 in the presence of only a few German SS men over 5,000 Jews were massacred in Polish Zofjówka by the Ukrainian Auxiliary Police leading to the town's complete sweep from existence.

=== Distrikt Galizien ===
Historians find it difficult to determine precisely when the first concerted effort at annihilation of all Jews began in the last weeks of June 1941 during Operation Barbarossa. Dr. Samuel Drix (Witness to Annihilation), Jochaim Schoenfeld (Holocaust Memoirs), and several survivors of the Janowska concentration camp, who were interviewed in the film Janovska Camp at Lvov, among other witnesses, have argued that the Final Solution began in Lwów (Lemberg) in Distrikt Galizien of the General Government during the German advance across Soviet-occupied Poland. Statements and memoirs of survivors emphasize that, when Ukrainian nationalists and ad hoc Ukrainian People's Militia (soon reorganized as the Ukrainian Auxiliary Police) began to murder women and children, rather than only male Jews, the "Final Solution" had begun. Witnesses have said that such murders happened both prior to and during the pogroms reportedly triggered by the NKVD prisoner massacre. The question of whether there was some coordination between the Lithuanian and Ukrainian militias remains open (i.e. collaborating for a joint assault in Kovno, Wilno, and Lwów).

The murders continued uninterrupted. On 12 October 1941, in Stanisławów, some 10,000–12,000 Jewish men, women, and children were shot at the Jewish cemetery by the German uniformed SS-men and Ukrainian Auxiliary Police during the so-called "Bloody Sunday" (de). The shooters began firing at 12 noon and continued without stopping by taking turns. There were picnic tables set up on the side with bottles of vodka and sandwiches for those who needed to rest from the deafening noise of gunfire. It was the single largest massacre of Polish Jews in Generalgouvernement prior to mass gassings of Aktion Reinhard, which commenced at Bełżec in March 1942. Notably, the extermination operations in Chełmno had begun on 8 December 1941, one-and-a-half months before Wannsee, but Chełmno—located in Reichsgau Wartheland—was not a part of Reinhard, and neither was Auschwitz-Birkenau functioning as an extermination center until November 1944 in Polish lands annexed by Hitler and added to Germany proper.

The conference at Wannsee gave impetus to the so-called second sweep of the Holocaust by the bullet in the east. Between April and July 1942 in Volhynia, 30,000 Jews were murdered in death pits with the help of dozens of newly formed Ukrainian Schutzmannschaft. Owing to good relations with the Ukrainian Hilfsverwaltung, these auxiliary battalions were deployed by the SS also in Russia Center, Russia South, and in Byelorussia; each with about 500 soldiers divided into three companies. They participated in the extermination of 150,000 Volhynian Jews alone, or 98 percent of the Jewish inhabitants of the entire region. In July 1942 the Completion of the Final Solution in the General Government territory which included Distrikt Galizien, was ordered personally by Himmler. He set the initial deadline for 31 December 1942.

== Phase two: deportations to extermination camps ==
Nazi extermination camps marked with black and white skulls. General Government territory: centre, Distrikt Galizien: lower–right. Death camp at Auschwitz: lower–left (in Provinz Oberschlesien), Nazi-Soviet line in red

When the Wehrmacht invaded the Soviet Union in June 1941, the area of the General Government was enlarged by the inclusion of regions that had been annexed by the Soviet Union since the 1939 invasion. The murders of Jews from the Łódź Ghetto in the Warthegau district began in early December 1941 with the use of gas vans (approved by Heydrich) at the Kulmhof extermination camp. Victims were misled under the deceptive guise of "Resettlement in the East", organised by SS Commissioners, which was also tried and tested at Chełmno. By the time the European-wide Final Solution was formulated two months later, Heydrich's RSHA had already confirmed the effectiveness of industrial murder by exhaust fumes, and the strength of deception.

Construction work on the first killing centre at Bełżec in occupied Poland began in October 1941, three months before the Wannsee Conference. The new facility was operational by March the following year. By mid-1942, two more death camps had been built on Polish lands: Sobibór operational by May 1942, and Treblinka operational in July. From July 1942, the mass murder of Polish and foreign Jews took place at Treblinka as part of Operation Reinhard, the deadliest phase of the Final Solution. More Jews were murdered at Treblinka than at any other Nazi extermination camp apart from Auschwitz. By the time the mass killings of Operation Reinhard ended in 1943, roughly two million Jews in German-occupied Poland had been murdered. The total number of people murdered in 1942 in Lublin/Majdanek, Bełżec, Sobibór, and Treblinka was 1,274,166 by Germany's own estimation, not counting Auschwitz II Birkenau nor Kulmhof. Their bodies were buried in mass graves initially. Both Treblinka and Bełżec were equipped with powerful crawler excavators from Polish construction sites in the vicinity, capable of most digging tasks without disrupting surfaces. Although other methods of extermination, such as the cyanic poison Zyklon B, were already being used at other Nazi killing centres such as Auschwitz, the Aktion Reinhard camps used lethal exhaust gases from captured tank engines.

The Holocaust by bullets (as opposed to the Holocaust by gas) went on in the territory of occupied Poland in conjunction with the ghetto uprisings, irrespective of death camps' quota. In two weeks of July 1942, the Słonim Ghetto revolt, crushed with the help of Latvian, Lithuanian, and Ukrainian Schutzmannschaft, cost the lives of 8,000–13,000 Jews. The second largest mass shooting (to that particular date) took place in late October 1942 when the insurgency was suppressed in the Pińsk Ghetto; over 26,000 men, women and children were shot with the aid of Belarusian Auxiliary Police before the ghetto's closure. During the suppression of the Warsaw Ghetto Uprising (the largest single revolt by Jews during World War II), 13,000 Jews were killed in action before May 1943. Numerous other uprisings were quelled without impacting the pre-planned Nazi deportations actions.

About two-thirds of the overall number of victims of the Final Solution were murdered before February 1943, which included the main phase of the extermination programme in the West launched by Eichmann on 11 June 1942 from Berlin. The Holocaust trains run by the Deutsche Reichsbahn and several other national railway systems delivered condemned Jewish captives from as far as Belgium, Bulgaria, France, Greece, Hungary, Italy, Moravia, the Netherlands, Romania, Slovakia, and even Scandinavia. The cremation of exhumed corpses to destroy any evidence left behind began in early spring and continued throughout summer. The nearly completed clandestine programme of murdering all deportees was explicitly addressed by Heinrich Himmler in his Posen speeches made to the leadership of the Nazi Party on 4 October and during a conference in Posen (Poznań) of 6 October 1943 in occupied Poland. Himmler explained why the Nazi leadership found it necessary to murder Jewish women and children along with the Jewish men. The assembled functionaries were told that the Nazi state policy was "the extermination of the Jewish people" as such.

We were faced with the question: what about the women and children?–I have decided on a solution to this problem. I did not consider myself justified to exterminate the men only—in other words, to kill them or have them killed while allowing the avengers, in the form of their children, to grow up in the midst of our sons and grandsons. The difficult decision had to be made to have this people disappear from the earth.

— Heinrich Himmler, 6 October 1943

On 19 October 1943, five days after the prisoner revolt in Sobibór, Operation Reinhard was terminated by Odilo Globocnik on behalf of Himmler. The camps responsible for the murder of nearly 2,700,000 Jews were soon closed. Bełżec, Sobibór, and Treblinka were dismantled and ploughed over before spring. The operation was followed by the single largest German massacre of Jews in the entire war carried out on 3 November 1943; with approximately 43,000 prisoners shot one-by-one simultaneously in three nearby locations by the Reserve Police Battalion 101 hand-in-hand with the Trawniki men from Ukraine. Auschwitz alone had enough capacity to fulfill the Nazis' remaining extermination needs.

=== Auschwitz II Birkenau ===
Unlike Belzec, Sobibor, Treblinka, and Lublin-Majdanek, which were built in the occupied General Government territory inhabited by the largest concentrations of Jews, the killing centre at Auschwitz subcamp of Birkenau operated directly in Polish areas annexed by Nazi Germany. The new gas chambers at Bunker I were finished around March 1942 when the Final Solution was officially launched at Belzec. Until mid June, around 20,000 Silesian Jews were murdered there using Zyklon B. In July 1942, Bunker II became operational. In August, another 10,000–13,000 Polish Jews from Silesia were murdered, along with 16,000 French Jews declared 'stateless', and 7,700 Jews from Slovakia.

The infamous 'Gate of Death' at Auschwitz II for the incoming freight trains was built of brick and cement mortar in 1943, and the three-track rail spur was added. Until mid-August, 45,000 Thessaloniki Jews were murdered in a mere six months, including over 30,000 Jews from Sosnowiec (Sosnowitz) and Bendzin Ghettos. The spring of 1944 marked the beginning of the last phase of the Final Solution at Birkenau. The new big ramps and sidings were constructed, and two freight elevators were installed inside Crematoria II and III for moving the bodies faster. The size of the Sonderkommando was nearly quadrupled in preparation for the Special Operation Hungary (Sonderaktion Ungarn). In May 1944, Auschwitz-Birkenau became the site of one of the two largest mass murder operations in modern history, after the Großaktion Warschau deportations of the Warsaw Ghetto inmates to Treblinka in 1942. It is estimated that until July 1944 approximately 320,000 Hungarian Jews were gassed at Birkenau in less than eight weeks. The entire operation was photographed by the SS. In total, between April and November 1944, Auschwitz II received over 585,000 Jews from over a dozen regions as far as Greece, Italy, and France, including 426,000 Jews from Hungary, 67,000 from Łódź, 25,000 from Theresienstadt, and the last 23,000 Jews from the General Government. Auschwitz was liberated by the Red Army on 27 January 1945, when the gassing had already stopped.

== Historiographic debate about the decision ==
Historians disagree as to when and how the Nazi leadership decided that the European Jews should be exterminated. The controversy is commonly described as the functionalism versus intentionalism debate which began in the 1960s, and subsided thirty years later. In the 1990s, the attention of mainstream historians moved away from the question of top executive orders triggering the Holocaust and focused on factors that were overlooked earlier, such as personal initiative and ingenuity of countless functionaries in charge of the killing fields. No written evidence of Hitler ordering the Final Solution has ever been found to serve as a "smoking gun", and therefore, this one particular question remains unanswered.

Hitler made numerous predictions regarding the Holocaust of the Jews of Europe prior to the beginning of World War II. During a speech given on 30 January 1939, on the sixth anniversary of his accession to power, Hitler said:

Today I will once more be a prophet: If the international Jewish financiers in and outside Europe should succeed in plunging the nations once more into a world war, then the result will not be the Bolshevization of the earth, and thus the victory of Jewry, but the annihilation of the Jewish race in Europe!

— Adolf Hitler, 1939

Raul Hilberg, in his 1961book The Destruction of the European Jews, was the first historian to systematically document and analyse the Nazi project to murder every Jew in Europe. Hilberg's analysis of the steps that led to the destruction of European Jews revealed that it was "an administrative process carried out by bureaucrats in a network of offices spanning a continent". Hilberg divides this bureaucracy into four components or hierarchies: the Nazi Party, the civil service, industry, and the Wehrmacht armed forces—but their cooperation is viewed as "so complete that we may truly speak of their fusion into a machinery of destruction". For Hilberg, the key stages in the destruction process were: definition and registration of the Jews; expropriation of property; concentration into ghettoes and camps; and, finally, annihilation. Hilberg gives an estimate of 5.1 million as the total number of Jews murdered. He breaks this figure down into three categories: Ghettoization and general privation: over 800,000; open-air shootings: over 1,300,000; extermination camps: up to 3,000,000.

With respect to the "functionalism versus intentionalism" debate about a master plan for the Final Solution, or the lack thereof, Hilberg posits what has been described as "a kind of structural determinism". Hilberg argues that "a destruction process has an inherent pattern" and the "sequence of steps in a destruction process is thus determined". If a bureaucracy is motivated "to inflict maximum damage upon a group of people", it is "inevitable that a bureaucracy—no matter how decentralized its apparatus or how unplanned its activities—should push its victims through these stages", culminating in their annihilation.

In his monograph, The Origins of the Final Solution: The Evolution of Nazi Jewish Policy, September 1939 – March 1942, Christopher Browning argues that Nazi policy toward the Jews was radicalized twice: in September 1939, when the invasion of Poland implied policies of mass expulsion and massive loss of Jewish lives; and in spring 1941, when preparation for Operation Barbarossa involved the planning of mass execution, mass expulsion, and starvation—to dwarf what had happened in Jewish Poland.

Browning believes that the "Final Solution as it is now understood—the systematic attempt to murder every last Jew within the German grasp" took shape during a five-week period, from 18 September to 25 October 1941. During this time, the sites of the first extermination camps were selected, different methods of murder were tested, Jewish emigration was forbidden, and 11 transports departed for Łódź as a temporary holding station. Of this period, Browning writes, "The vision of the Final Solution had crystallised in the minds of the Nazi leadership, and was being turned into reality." This was the peak of Nazi victories against the Soviet Army on the Eastern Front, and, according to Browning, the stunning series of German victories led to both an expectation that the war would soon be won, and the planning of the final destruction of the "Jewish-Bolshevik enemy".

Browning describes the creation of the extermination camps, which were responsible for the largest number of murders in the Final Solution, as bringing together three separate developments within Nazi Germany: the concentration camps which had been established in Germany since 1933; an expansion of the gassing technology of the Nazi euthanasia programme to provide a murder technique of greater efficiency and psychological detachment; and the creation of "factories of death" to be fed endless streams of victims by mass uprooting and deportation that utilized the experience and personnel from earlier population resettlement programmes—especially the HSSPF and Adolf Eichmann's RSHA for "Jewish affairs and evacuations".

Peter Longerich argues that the search for a finite date on which the Nazis embarked upon the extermination of the Jews is futile, in his book Holocaust: The Nazi Persecution and Murder of the Jews (2011). Longerich writes: "We should abandon the notion that it is historically meaningful to try to filter the wealth of available historical material and pick out a single decision" that led to the Holocaust.

Timothy Snyder writes that Longerich "grants the significance of Greiser's murder of Jews by gas at Chełmno in December 1941", but also detects a significant moment of escalation in spring 1942, which includes "the construction of the large death factory at Treblinka for the destruction of the Warsaw Jews, and the addition of a gas chamber to the concentration camp at Auschwitz for the murder of the Jews of Silesia". Longerich suggests that it "was only in the summer of 1942, that mass killing was finally understood as the realization of the Final Solution, rather than as an extensively violent preliminary to some later program of slave labor and deportation to the lands of a conquered USSR". For Longerich, to see mass-murder as the Final Solution was an acknowledgement by the Nazi leadership that there would not be a German military victory over the USSR in the near future.

David Cesarani emphasises the improvised, haphazard nature of Nazi policies in response to changing war time conditions in his overview, Final Solution: The Fate of the European Jews 1933–49 (2016). "Cesarani provides telling examples", wrote Mark Roseman, "of a lack of coherence and planning for the future in Jewish policy, even when we would most expect it. The classic instance is the invasion of Poland in 1939, when not even the most elementary consideration had been given to what should happen to Poland's Jews either in the shorter or longer term. Given that Poland was home to the largest Jewish population in the world, and that, in a couple of years, it would house the extermination camps, this is remarkable."

Whereas Browning places the Nazi plan to exterminate the Jews in the context of the Wehrmacht victories on the Eastern front, Cesarani argues that the German subsequent realisation that there would be no swift victory over the Soviet Union "scuppered the last territorial 'solution' still on the table: expulsion to Siberia". Germany's declaration of war on the United States on 11 December 1941, "meant that holding European Jews hostage to deter the US from entering the conflict was now pointless". Cesarani concludes, the Holocaust "was rooted in anti-Semitism, but it was shaped by war". The fact that the Nazis were, ultimately, so successful in murdering between five and six million Jews was not due to the efficiency of Nazi Germany or the clarity of their policies. "Rather, the catastrophic rate of killing was due to German persistence ... and the duration of the murderous campaigns. This last factor was largely a consequence of allied military failure."

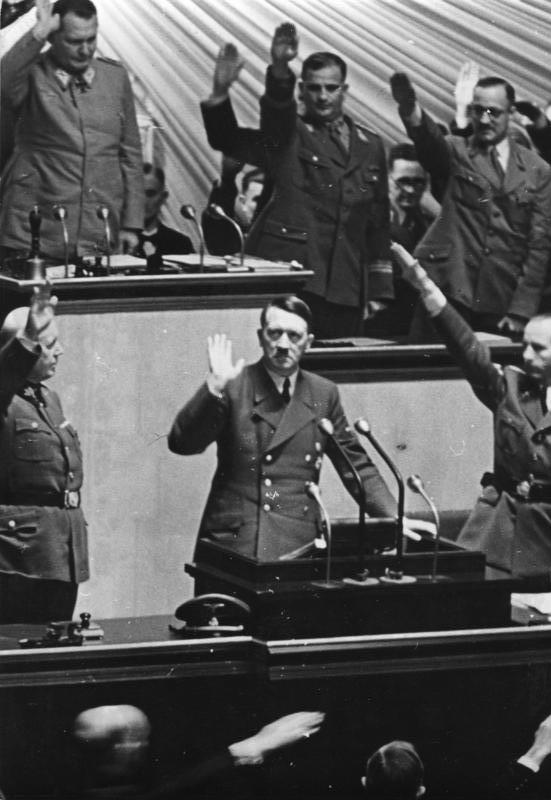
Berlin, Reichstag session of 11 December 1941: Adolf Hitler declares war on the United States of America.

The entry of the U.S. into the War is also crucial to the time-frame proposed by Christian Gerlach, who argued in his 1997 thesis that the Final Solution decision was announced on 12 December 1941, when Hitler addressed a meeting of the Nazi Party (the Reichsleiter) and of regional party leaders (the Gauleiter). (Note: Commenting on Gerlach, Christopher Browning writes: "What he interprets as Hitler's basic decision, I see as an official initiation of party leaders to a decision taken several months earlier.") The day after Hitler's speech, on 13 December 1941, Joseph Goebbels wrote in his diary:

With respect of the Jewish Question, the Führer has decided to make a clean sweep. He prophesied to the Jews that if they again brought about a world war, they would see their annihilation in it. That wasn't just a catch-word. The world war is here and the annihilation of the Jews must be the necessary consequence.

Cesarani notes that by 1943, as the military position of the German forces deteriorated, the Nazi leadership became more openly explicit about the Final Solution. In March, Goebbels confided to his diary: "On the Jewish question especially, we are in it so deeply that there is no getting out any longer. And that is a good thing. Experience teaches that a movement and a people who have burned their bridges fight with much greater determination and fewer constraints than those that have a chance of retreat."

When Himmler addressed senior SS personnel and leading members of the regime in the Posen speeches on 4 October 1943, he used "the fate of the Jews as a sort of blood bond to tie the civil and military leadership to the Nazi cause".

Today, I am going to refer quite frankly to a very grave chapter. We can mention it now among ourselves quite openly and yet we shall never talk about it in public. I'm referring to the evacuation of the Jews, the extermination of the Jewish people. Most of you will know what it's like to see 100 corpses side by side or 500 corpses or 1,000 of them. To have coped with this and—except for cases of human weakness—to have remained decent, that has made us tough. This is an unwritten—never to be written—and yet glorious page in our history.

== See also ==
- Höfle telegram with arrivals for the camps of Einsatz Reinhardt
- History of the Jews during World War II
- Korherr Report written in 1943 on the progress of the Final Solution
- Never again
- Porajmos, Romani genocide during World War II
- Timeline of the Holocaust – The genocide of Jewish people by Nazi Germany, under the rule of Adolf Hitler

== Bibliography ==
- Arad, Yitzhak (1987). Belzec, Sobibor, Treblinka. The Operation Reinhard Death Camps. Bloomington: Indiana University Press. ISBN 0-253-21305-3.
- Baumslag, Naomi (2005). Murderous Medicine: Nazi Doctors, Human Experimentation, and Typhus. Praeger Publishers. ISBN 0-275-98312-9.
- Breitman, Richard (1991). The Architect of Genocide: Himmler and The Final Solution. New York: Alfred A. Knopf. ISBN 0-394-56841-9.
- Browning, Christopher R. (1998) [1992]. Ordinary Men: Reserve Police Battalion 101 and the Final Solution in Poland (PDF). Penguin Books. Archived from the original (PDF) on 19 October 2013.
- ——— (2004). The Origins of the Final Solution : The Evolution of Nazi Jewish Policy, September 1939 – March 1942. Comprehensive History of the Holocaust. With contributions by Jürgen Matthäus. London: Random House / William Heinemann. ISBN 0803203926. Newer edition by Univ. of Nebraska Press / Yad Vashem 2007.
- Cesarani, David (2005) [2004]. Eichmann: His Life and Crimes. London: Vintage. ISBN 978-0-099-44844-0.
- ——— (2016). Final Solution: The Fate of the Jews 1933–1949. London: Macmillan. ISBN 978-0-330-53537-3.
- Dawidowicz, Lucy (1975). The War Against the Jews. Holt, Rinehart and Winston. ISBN 0-03-013661-X.
- Fleming, Gerald (1984). Hitler and the Final Solution. Berkeley: University of California Press. ISBN 978-0-520-05103-4.
- Gerlach, Christian (December 1998). "The Wannsee Conference, the Fate of German Jews, and Hitler's decision in principle to exterminate all European Jews" (PDF). The Journal of Modern History. 70 (4). Chicago: 759–812. doi:10.1086/235167. S2CID 143904500.
- Głowacka-Penczyńska, Anetta; Kawski, Tomasz; Mędykowski, Witold; Horev, Tuvia, eds. (2015). The First to be Destroyed: The Jewish Community of Kleczew and the Beginning of the Final Solution. Boston: Academic Studies Press. ISBN 978-1-61811-284-2.
- Grossmann, Kurt R. (1954). "Reitlinger, Gerald. 'The Final Solution' (Book Review)". Annals of the American Academy of Political and Social Science: 211. doi:10.1177/000271625429200190. S2CID 143630900.
- Herf, Jeffrey (2005). "The "Jewish War": Goebbels and the Antisemitic Campaigns of the Nazi Propaganda Ministry". Holocaust and Genocide Studies. 19 (1): 51–80. doi:10.1093/hgs/dci003.
- Hilberg, Raul (1985). The Destruction of the European Jews: The Revised and Definitive Edition. New York: Holmes and Meier. ISBN 0-8419-0832-X – via Archive.org search inside. "The deportations ... were the work of a much larger apparatus that had to deal with a host of constraints and requirements. The effort, as we shall see, was deemed necessary to accomplish the Final Solution on a European-wide scale.^{[p. 273]}"
- Laqueur, Walter; Baumel, Judith Tydor (2001). The Holocaust Encyclopedia. New Haven and London: Yale University Press. ISBN 978-0-30008-432-0.
- Longerich, Peter (2003). The Unwritten Order: Hitler's Role in The Final Solution. Stroud: Tempus Publishing. ISBN 978-075242564-1.
- ——— (2010). Holocaust: The Nazi Persecution and Murder of the Jews. Oxford University Press. ISBN 978-0192804365.
- ——— (2012). Heinrich Himmler. Translation by Jeremy Noakes and Lesley Sharpe. Oxford University Press. ISBN 978-019959232-6.
- Mędykowski, Witold Wojciech (2018). Macht Arbeit Frei?: German Economic Policy and Forced Labor of Jews in the General Government, 1939–1943. Brighton: Academic Studies Press. ISBN 978-1-61811-956-8.
- Niewyk, Donald; Nicosia, Francis (2000). The Columbia Guide to the Holocaust. New York: Columbia University Press. ISBN 978-0-23111-201-7.
- Reitlinger, Gerald Roberts. 1953. The Final Solution: The Attempt to Exterminate the Jews of Europe 1939–1945. London: Valentine Mitchell.
- Roseman, Mark (2002). The Villa, The Lake, The Meeting: Wannsee and the Final Solution. Allen Lane. ISBN 0-713-99570-X.
- Schultheis, Herbert; Wahler, Isaac E. (1988). Bilder und Akten der Gestapo Wuerzburg ueber die Judendeportationen 1941–1943 (German-English ed.). Bad Neustadt a. d. Saale. ISBN 978-3-9800482-7-9.
