= Jacob Shatzky =

- Yaakov Shatski
- Born: 1893; Warsaw, Congress Poland
- Died: 1956 (aged 62–63)
- Other names: Yankev Shatski; Szacki
- Education: University of Warsaw
- Occupation: Historian
- Employer: New York State Psychiatric Institute

Jacob Shatzky (also: Yaakov, or Yankev Shatski; in Polish: Szacki) (1893–1956) was a distinguished Jewish historian.

Shatzky was born in Warsaw. He received a traditional Jewish education and went on to study at universities in Lwów, Vienna, Berlin, and Warsaw. He earned his Ph.D. from the University of Warsaw in 1922 with a thesis on "The Jewish Question in the Kingdom of Poland During the Paskiewicz Era." Historians who studied under Shatzky include Lucy Dawidowicz.

Shatzky enlisted in Pilsudski's Legion and fought with distinction in the First World War; he was promoted to the rank of lieutenant. He was sent by the Polish Foreign Ministry in 1918 to report on a pogrom in Vilna. He resigned from his post when it became clear that the government would not act to punish the perpetrators of the pogroms.

Shatzky emigrated to the United States in 1923. He served as Chief Librarian of the New York State Psychiatric Institute from 1930 to 1956. He acquired the personal library of Sigmund Freud for the collection.

== Books (in Yiddish) ==
- Gzeyres Ta"kh [The Chmielnicki Massacres of 1648] (Vilnius: YIVO, 1938)
- Yidishe bildungs-politik in Poyln fun 1806 biz 1866 [Jewish Educational Policy in Poland from 1806 to 1866] (New York: YIVO, 1943)
- Geshikhte fun Yidn in Varshe [The History of the Jews in Warsaw] (3 volumes; New York: YIVO, 1947–1953)
