= Michael Thomson =

Michael Thomson may refer to:

- Michael Thomson (footballer) (born 1961), Essendon and Richmond VFL/AFL footballer
- Michael Thomson (journalist), Australian television presenter for Nine News
- Mick Thomson (born 1973), American musician
- Michael Thomson (actor), Scottish actor
- Michael Thomson (cyclist) (born 1983), South African track cyclist
- Mike Thomson (sport shooter) (born 1954), Scottish sport shooter

== See also ==
- Mike Thomson (born 1946), member of the Missouri House of Representatives
- Michael Thompson (disambiguation)
