= Lucy Dawidowicz =

American historian and writer (1915–1990)

- Born: Lucy Schildkret; June 16, 1915; New York City, U.S.
- Died: December 5, 1990 (aged 75); New York City, U.S.
- Education: Hunter College
- Occupations: Historian; author

Lucy Dawidowicz (née Schildkret; June 16, 1915 – December 5, 1990) was an American historian and writer. She wrote books about modern Jewish history, in particular, about the Holocaust.

== Life ==
Dawidowicz was born in New York City as Lucy Schildkret. Her parents, Max and Dora (née Ofnaem) Schildkret, Jewish immigrants from Poland, were secular-minded with little interest in religion. Dawidowicz did not attend a service at a synagogue until 1938.

Dawidowicz's first interests were poetry and literature. She attended Hunter College from 1932 to 1936 and obtained a B.A. in English. She went on to study for a M.A. at Columbia University, but abandoned her studies because of concerns over events in Europe. At the encouragement of her mentor, the historian Jacob Shatzky, Dawidowicz decided to focus on history, especially Jewish history. Dawidowicz made the decision to learn Yiddish, and at Shatzky's urging, she relocated to Wilno, Poland (present-day Vilnius, Lithuania) in 1938 to work at the Yiddish Scientific Institute (known by its Yiddish acronym as the YIVO). With the help of Shatzky she became a research fellow there.

Dawidowicz lived in Wilno until August 1939 when she returned to the United States just weeks before the war broke out. During her time at the YIVO, she became close to three of the leading scholars there, namely Zelig Kalmanovich, Max Weinreich and Zalmen Reisen. Weinreich escaped the Holocaust because he went to New York to establish a branch of the YIVO there before World War II, but Kalmanovich and Reisen perished. Dawidowicz had been close to Kalmanovich and his family, whom she reportedly described as being her real parents. From 1940 until 1946, Dawidowicz worked as an assistant to a research director at the New York City office of the YIVO. During the war, like most Americans, she was aware of the Nazi persecution of the Jewish people in Europe, although it was not until after the war that she became aware of the full extent of the Holocaust.

=== Following World War II ===
In 1946, Dawidowicz traveled back to Europe, where she worked for the American Jewish Joint Distribution Committee as an aid worker among the Jewish survivors in the Displaced Persons (DP) camps. She helped the survivors to re-create schools and libraries. Over a period of months in Frankfurt, she examined books that had been looted from Jewish institutions by the Nazis and identified those to be returned to the YIVO headquarters in New York, recovering in this way vast collections of books.

In 1947, she returned to the U.S. and on January 3, 1948, she married a Polish Jew, Szymon Dawidowicz. Upon her return to the U.S. she worked as a researcher for the novelist John Hersey's book The Wall, a dramatization of the 1943 Warsaw Ghetto Uprising. From 1948 until 1960, Dawidowicz worked as a historical researcher for the American Jewish Committee. During the same period, Dawidowicz wrote frequently for Commentary, the New York Times and the New York Times Book Review.

An enthusiastic fan of the New York Mets, Dawidowicz lived the rest of her life in New York. In 1985, she founded the Fund for the Translation of Jewish Literature from Yiddish and Hebrew into English. A fierce anti-Communist, Dawidowicz campaigned for the right of Soviet Jews to emigrate to Israel. She died in New York City in 1990, aged 75, from undisclosed causes.

== Holocaust study and historiography ==
Dawidowicz’s major interests were the Holocaust and Jewish history. A passionate Zionist, Dawidowicz believed that had the Mandate for Palestine been implemented as intended, establishing the Jewish State of Israel before the Holocaust, "the terrible story of six million dead might have had another outcome". Dawidowicz took an Intentionalist line on the origins of the Holocaust, contending that, beginning with the end of World War I on November 11, 1918, Hitler conceived his master plans, and everything he did from then on was directed toward the achievement of his goal, and that he had "openly espoused his program of annihilation" when he wrote Mein Kampf in 1924.

Dawidowicz's conclusion was: "Through a maze of time, Hitler's decision of November 1918 led to Operation Barbarossa. There never had been any ideological deviation or wavering determination. In the end only the question of opportunity mattered."

In her view, the overwhelming majority of Germans subscribed to the völkische antisemitism from the 1870s onward, and it was this morbid antisemitism that attracted support for Hitler and the Nazis. Dawidowicz maintained that from the Middle Ages onward, German Christian society and culture were suffused with antisemitism and there was a direct link from medieval pogroms to the Nazi death camps of the 1940s.

Citing Fritz Fischer, Dawidowicz argued that there were powerful lines of continuity in German history and there was a Sonderweg (Special Path), which inevitably led Germany to Nazism.

Dawidowicz criticized what she considered to be revisionist historians as incorrect and/or sympathetic to the Nazis, as well as German historians who sought to minimize German complicity in the Nazi era attempt to annihilate Europe's Jews.

For Dawidowicz, Nazism was the essence of total evil, and she wrote that the Nazi movement was the "... daemon let loose in society, Cain in corporate embodiment." Regarding foreign policy questions, she sharply disagreed with A.J.P. Taylor over his book The Origins of the Second World War. In even stronger terms, she condemned the American neo-Nazi historian David Hoggan for his book War Forced on Germany as well as David Irving's revisionist Hitler's War, which suggested Hitler was unaware of the Holocaust.

In her view, historians who took a functionalist line on the origins of the Holocaust question were guilty of ignoring their responsibility to historical truth.

=== Disputes with Arno Mayer ===
Dawidowicz was a leading critic of the American historian Arno J. Mayer's account of the Holocaust in his 1988 book Why Did the Heavens Not Darken? arguing that Mayer played up anti-communism at the expense of antisemitism as an explanation for the Holocaust.

Dawidowicz titled her review of Why Did the Heavens Not Darken? in the October 1989 edition of Commentary as "Perversions of the Holocaust". Dawidowicz argued against Mayer that the historical evidence undoubtedly shows that Hitler never believed that the war was lost as early as December 1941 and that Mayer's theory is anachronistic.

Dawidowicz commented that the Einsatzgruppen had been massacring Jews since the beginning of Operation Barbarossa in June 1941 and that Mayer's claim that the Jews were only surrogate victims due to Germany's inability to defeat the Soviet Union was, in her opinion, rubbish.

Dawidowicz attacked Mayer for saying that more Jews died at Auschwitz from disease than from mass gassing and for supporting Holocaust denial by writing that Holocaust survivor testimony was highly unreliable as a historical source.

Dawidowicz questioned Mayer's motives in listing the works of Arthur Butz and Paul Rassinier in his bibliography.

Dawidowicz ended her review of Why Did the Heavens Not Darken? by accusing Mayer of excusing German racism, rationalizing the Nazi dictatorship, of portraying Soviet Jews as better off than they were under the Soviet dictatorship, and by presenting the Holocaust as due to reasonable political goals instead of, as she believed, being an ideological decision fueled by fanatical antisemitism.

=== Other ===
She criticized the British historian Norman Davies, the author of God's Playground: A History of Poland, for "his virtuosity in erasing Polish antisemitism from the history books he writes" and for peppering some of his writing "with anti-Semitic tidbits." Ronald Hilton, professor emeritus at Stanford University replied: "Davies is not anti-Semitic, his reputation for fairness is recognized internationally." He also added: "People are frightened to speak up about this." Davies "absolutely" denied being antisemitic.

During the same period, Dawidowicz denounced the work of the philosopher Ernst Nolte, whom she accused of seeking to justify the Holocaust. In her The War Against the Jews (1975), she writes that antisemitism has had a long history within Christianity.

In her opinion, the line of "anti-Semitic descent" from Martin Luther to Adolf Hitler was "easy to draw". She wrote that both Hitler and Luther were obsessed by the "demonologized universe" inhabited by Jews and that the similarities between Luther's anti-Jewish writings and modern antisemitism are no coincidence because they derived from a common history of Judenhass.

Raul Hilberg's 1961 The Destruction of the European Jews has a detailed breakdown that reveals a total estimated death toll of 5.1 million Jews. In her book The War Against the Jews (1975), Dawidowicz researched birth and death records in many cities of prewar Europe to come up with a death toll of 5,933,900 Jews.

=== Criticism of Dawidowicz ===
Raul Hilberg criticized Dawidowicz for her work The War Against the Jews, stating that it builds "largely on secondary sources and conveying nothing whatever that could be called new," and then going on to say in regards to Dawidowicz's portrayal of Jewish resistance and resisters that she included "soup ladlers and all others in the ghettos who staved off starvation and despair." Hilberg suggests that "nostalgic Jewish readers [would find here] vaguely consoling words, [which] could be easily clutched by all those who did not wish to look deeper." He then lists over 20 key authors on the subjects that Dawidowicz covers, that she did not use as references in her own work. Hilberg ends on the subject of Dawidowicz stating "To be sure, Dawidowicz has not been taken all that seriously by historians".

== Books by Dawidowicz ==
Her books include The War Against the Jews, her best-selling 1975 history of the Holocaust, and The Holocaust and the Historians, a study of Holocaust historiography. Her major work suggest that the destruction of Jews was a central element in Nazi ideology, reflecting a principle war aim of Hitler. Just as important as his military conquest of Europe, the Nazi regime believed the Holocaust served as a necessary component of the program, which Dawidowicz analyzed.

A collection of her essays relating to Jewish history, What Is the Use of Jewish History?, was published posthumously in 1992. Dawidowicz wrote The Golden Tradition: Jewish Life and Thought in Eastern Europe to document Jewish civilization in Eastern Europe before its destruction during the Holocaust.

In On Equal Terms: Jews in America, 1881–1981, Dawidowicz wrote an account of Jews in the United States that reflected an appreciation for her American citizenship, which saved her from being a victim herself in the Holocaust.

== Awards ==
- 1976 Anisfield-Wolf Book Award, for The War Against the Jews: 1933–1945
- 1990 National Jewish Book Award for From That Place and Time: A Memoir, 1938-1947

== Bibliography ==
- Politics in a Pluralist Democracy; studies of voting in the 1960 election, with a foreword by Richard M. Scammon, New York, Institute of Human Relations Press, 1963 (co-written with Leon J. Goldstein)
- The Golden Tradition: Jewish Life and Thought in Eastern Europe, Boston, MA: Beacon Press, 1967 (editor)
- Reviews of The German Dictatorship by Karl Dietrich Bracher & The Foreign Policy of Hitler's Germany by Gerhard Weinberg, pgs. 91–93 from Commentary, Volume 52, Issue # 2, August 1971.
- The War Against the Jews, 1933-1945, New York: Holt, Rinehart and Winston: 1975; ISBN 0-03-013661-X
- A Holocaust Reader, New York: Behrman House, 1976; ISBN 0-87441-219-6
- The Jewish Presence: Essays on Identity And History, New York: Holt, Rinehart and Winston, 1977; ISBN 0-03-016676-4
- Spiritual Resistance: Art from Concentration Camps, 1940-1945: a selection of drawings and paintings from the collection of Kibbutz Lohamei Haghetaot, Israel, with essays by Miriam Novitch, Lucy Dawidowicz, Tom L. Freudenheim, Philadelphia: The Jewish Publication Society of America, 1981; ISBN 0-8074-0157-9
- The Holocaust and the Historians, Harvard University Press, Cambridge, Massachusetts: 1981; ISBN 0-674-40566-8
- On Equal Terms: Jews in America, 1881-1981, New York: Holt, Rinehart and Winston, 1982; ISBN 0-03-061658-1
- From That Place and Time: A Memoir, 1938-1947, New York: W.W. Norton, 1989; ISBN 0-393-02674-4
- What Is the Use of Jewish history? : Essays, edited and with an introduction by Neal Kozodoy, New York: Schocken Books, 1992 ISBN 0-8052-4116-7
- Nancy Sinkoff, From Left to Right: Lucy S. Dawidowicz, the New York Intellectuals, and the Politics of History, Wayne State University Press, 2020 ISBN 9780814345108

== Sources ==
- Bessel, Richard, review of The Holocaust and Historians, Times Higher Education Supplement, March 19, 1982, page 14.
- Eley, Geoff "Holocaust History", London Review of Books, March 3–17, 1982, page 6.
- Marrus, Michael The Holocaust In History, Toronto: Lester & Orpen Dennys, 1987 ISBN 0-88619-155-6.
- Rosenbaum, Ron Explaining Hitler: The Search For The Origins Of His Evil, New York: Random House, 1998 ISBN 0-679-43151-9.
