= Raul Hilberg =

Austrian-born American Holocaust researcher (1926–2007)

- Born: June 2, 1926; Vienna, Austria
- Died: August 4, 2007 (aged 81); Williston, Vermont, US
- Spouses: Christine Hemenway (div.); Gwendolyn Montgomery (m. 1980)

Academic background
- Education: Brooklyn College (BA); Columbia University (MA, PhD)
- Doctoral advisor: William T. R. Fox; Franz Neumann

Academic work
- Discipline: History; political science
- Institutions: University of Vermont
- Notable works: The Destruction of the European Jews (1961)

Raul Hilberg (June 2, 1926 – August 4, 2007) was a Jewish Austrian-born American political scientist, historian, and Holocaust researcher. He was widely considered to be the preeminent scholar on the Holocaust.

Christopher R. Browning has called him the founding father of Holocaust studies and his three-volume, 1,273-page magnum opus, The Destruction of the European Jews, is regarded as seminal for research into the Nazi Final Solution.

== Life and career ==
Hilberg was born in Vienna, Austria, to a Polish-speaking Jewish family. His father, a small-goods salesman, was born in a Galician village, moved to Vienna in his teens, was decorated for bravery on the Russian front in World War I, and married Hilberg's mother who was from Buczacz, now in Ukraine.

The young Hilberg was a loner, pursuing solitary hobbies such as geography, music and train spotting. Though his parents attended a synagogue on occasion, he personally found the irrationality of religion repellent and developed an aversion to it.

He did, however, attend a Zionist school in Vienna, which inculcated in him the necessity of defending against, rather than surrendering to, the rising menace of Nazism.

Following the March 1938 German annexation of Austria, his family was evicted from their home at gunpoint and his father was arrested by the Nazis; he was later released because of his service record as a combatant during World War I.

One year later, on April 1, 1939, at age 13, Hilberg fled Austria with his family; after reaching France, they embarked on a ship bound for Cuba. Following a four-month stay in Cuba, his family arrived in Miami, Florida, on September 1, 1939, the day the Second World War broke out in Europe. During the ensuing war in Europe, 26 members of Hilberg's family were murdered in the Holocaust.

The Hilbergs settled in Brooklyn, New York, where Raul attended Abraham Lincoln High School and Brooklyn College. He intended to make a career in chemistry but found that it did not suit him, and he left his studies to work in a factory. He served in the United States Army from 1944 to 1946.

As early as 1942, Hilberg, after reading scattered reports of what would later become known as the Nazi genocide, went so far as to call Stephen Samuel Wise and ask him what he planned to do with regard to "the complete annihilation of European Jewry". According to Hilberg, Wise hung up.

Hilberg served first in the 45th Infantry Division during World War II, but, given his native fluency in German and academic interests, he was soon attached to the War Documentation Department, charged with examining archives throughout Europe. While in Munich, he stumbled upon Hitler's crated private library. This discovery, together with learning that 26 close members of his family had been exterminated, prompted Hilberg's research into the Holocaust, a term which he personally disliked, though in later years he himself used it.

=== Academic career ===
After returning to civilian life, Hilberg chose to study political science, earning his Bachelor of Arts degree at Brooklyn College in 1948. He was deeply impressed by the importance of elites and bureaucracies while attending Hans Rosenberg's lectures on the Prussian civil service.

In 1947, at one particular point in Rosenberg's course, Hilberg was taken aback when his teacher remarked: "The most wicked atrocities perpetrated on a civilian population in modern times occurred during the Napoleonic occupation of Spain." The young Hilberg interrupted the lecture to ask why the recent murder of six million Jews did not figure in Rosenberg's assessment.

Rosenberg replied that it was a complicated matter, but that the lectures dealt only with history down to 1930, adding, "History doesn't reach down into the present age." Hilberg was amazed by this highly educated, German-Jewish emigrant passing over the genocide of European Jews in order to expound on Napoleon and the occupation of Spain. Hilberg recalled, it was an almost taboo topic in the Jewish community, and he pursued his research as a kind of "protest against silence".

Hilberg went on to first complete a Master of Arts degree (1950) and then a Doctor of Philosophy (Ph.D.) degree (1955) at Columbia University, where he entered the graduate program in public law and government. In 1951, he obtained a temporary appointment to work on the War Documentation Project under the direction of Fritz T. Epstein. Hilberg was undecided under whom he should carry out his doctoral research. Having attended a course on international law, he was also attracted to the lectures of Salo Baron, the leading authority on Jewish historiography at the time, with particular expertise in the field of laws pertaining to the Jewish people.

According to Hilberg, to attend Baron's lectures was to enjoy the rare opportunity of observing "a walking library, a monument of incredible erudition", active before his classroom of students. Baron asked Hilberg whether he was interested in working under him on the annihilation of Europe's Jewish population. Hilberg demurred on the grounds that his interest lay in the perpetrators, and thus he would not begin with the Jews who were their victims, but rather with what was done to them.

Hilberg decided to write the greater part of his Ph.D. under the supervision of Franz Neumann, the author of an influential wartime analysis of the German totalitarian state. Neumann was initially reluctant to take Hilberg on as his doctoral student. He had already read Hilberg's master's thesis, and found, as both a deeply patriotic German and a Jew, that certain themes sketched there were unbearably painful.

In particular, he had asked that the section on Jewish cooperation be removed, to no avail. (Note: "Streichen Sie das!" – "Stimmt das nicht?", entgegnete ich. Darauf er: "Nein, too much to take – das ist zu viel." (Aly 2002)) Neumann nonetheless relented, warning his student, however, that such a dissertation was professionally imprudent and might well prove to be his academic funeral.

Undeterred by the prospect, Hilberg pressed on without regard for the possible consequences. Neumann himself contacted Nuremberg prosecutor Telford Taylor directly, to facilitate Hilberg's access to the appropriate archives. After Neumann's death in a traffic accident in 1954, Hilberg completed his doctoral requirement under the supervision of William T. R. Fox.

His dissertation won him the university's prestigious Clark F. Ansley Award in 1955, which carried with it the right to have his thesis published by his alma mater. He taught the first college-level course in the United States dedicated to the Holocaust, when the subject was finally introduced into his university's curriculum in 1974.

Hilberg obtained his first academic position at the University of Vermont in 1955, and took up residence there in January 1956. Most of his teaching career was spent there, where he was a member of the Department of Political Science. He was appointed emeritus professor upon his retirement in 1991.

In 2006, the university established the Raul Hilberg Distinguished Professorship of Holocaust Studies. Each year the University of Vermont's Carolyn and Leonard Miller Center for Holocaust Studies hosts the Raul Hilberg Memorial Lecture. Hilberg was appointed to the President's Commission on the Holocaust by Jimmy Carter in 1979. He later served for many years on its successor, the United States Holocaust Memorial Council, which is the governing body for the United States Holocaust Memorial Museum.

Following his death, the Museum established the Raul Hilberg Fellowship, intended to support the development of new generations of Holocaust scholars. For his seminal and profound services to the historiography of the Holocaust, he was honored with Germany's Order of Merit, the highest recognition that can be paid to a non-German.

In 2002, he was awarded the Geschwister-Scholl-Preis for Die Quellen des Holocaust (Sources of the Holocaust). He was elected a Fellow of the American Academy of Arts and Sciences in 2005 (AAAS).

== The Destruction of the European Jews ==
Front cover of the 2005 edition of The Destruction of the European Jews

Hilberg is best known for his influential study of the Holocaust, The Destruction of the European Jews. His approach assumed that the event of the Shoah was not "unique". He said in a late interview:

For me the Holocaust was a vast, single event, but I am never going to use the word unique, because I recognize that when one starts breaking it into pieces, which is my trade, one finds completely recognizable, ordinary ingredients.

His final doctoral supervisor, Professor Fox, worried that the original study was far too long. Hilberg therefore suggested submitting a mere quarter of the research he had written up, and his proposal was accepted. His Ph.D. dissertation was awarded the prestigious Clark F. Ansley prize, which entitled it to be published by Columbia University Press in a print run of 850 copies.

However, Hilberg was firm in desiring that the whole work be published, not just the doctoral version. To obtain this, two opinions in favor of full publication were required. Yad Vashem as early as 1958, declined to participate in its projected publication, fearing that it would encounter "hostile criticism".

The work was duly submitted to two additional academic authorities in the field, but both judgments were negative, viewing Hilberg's work as polemical: one rejected it as anti-German, the other rejected it as anti-Jewish.

=== Struggle for publication ===
Hilberg, unwilling to compromise, submitted the complete manuscript to several major publishing houses over the following six years, without luck. Princeton University Press turned down the manuscript, on Hannah Arendt's advice, after quickly vetting it in a mere two weeks.

After successive rejections from five prominent publishers, it finally went to press in 1961 under a minor imprint, the Chicago-based publisher, Quadrangle Books. Yad Vashem also reneged on an initial agreement to publish the manuscript, since it treated as marginal the armed Jewish resistance central to the Zionist narrative.

By good fortune, a wealthy patron, Frank Petschek, a German-Czech Jew whose family coal business had suffered from the Nazi Aryanization program, laid out $15,000, a substantial sum at the time, to cover the costs of a print run of 5,500 volumes, of which some 1,300 copies were set aside for distribution to libraries.

Resistance to Hilberg's work, the difficulties he encountered in finding a US editor, and subsequent delays with the German edition, owed much to the Cold War atmosphere of the times, according to Norman Finkelstein. Finkelstein observed in a 2007 article for CounterPunch:

It is hard now to remember that the Nazi holocaust was once a taboo subject. During the early years of the Cold War, mention of the Nazi holocaust was seen as undermining the critical U.S.–West German alliance. It was airing the dirty laundry of the barely de-Nazified West German elites and thereby playing into the hands of the Soviet Union, which didn't tire of remembering the crimes of the West German "revanchists."

The German rights to the book were acquired by the German publishing firm Droemer Knaur in 1963. Droemer Knaur, however, after dithering over it for two years, decided against publication, due to the work's documentation of certain episodes of cooperation by Jewish authorities with the executioners of the Holocaust – material which the editors said would only play into the hands of the antisemitic right wing in Germany. Hilberg dismissed this fear as "nonsense".

Some two decades were to pass before it finally came out in a German edition in 1982, under the imprint of a Berlin publishing house. Hilberg – a life-long Republican voter, according to both Norman Finkelstein and Michael Neumann – seemed to be somewhat bemused by the prospect of being published under such an imprint, and asked its director, Ulf Wolter, what on earth his massive treatise on the Holocaust had in common with some of the firm's staple themes, socialism and women's rights.

Wolter replied succinctly: "Injustice!" In a letter of July 14, 1982, Hilberg had written to director Ulf Wolter the partner of Werner Olle in the firm Olle & Wolter, "Everything you said to me during this brief visit has impressed me very much and has given me a good feeling about our joint venture. I am glad that you are my publisher in Germany." He spoke about a "second edition" of his work, "solid enough for the next century".

=== Approach and structure of book ===
The Destruction of the European Jews provided "the first clear description of (the) incredibly complicated machinery of destruction" (Hannah Arendt) set up under Nazism. For Hilberg there was deep irony in the judgement since Arendt, asked to give an opinion of his manuscript in 1959, had advised against publication. Her judgement influenced the rejection slip he received from Princeton University Press following its submission, thus denying him a mainstream academic publishing house.

With a clear writing that ranged, with careful details, over the huge archives of Nazism, Hilberg delineated the history of the mechanisms, political, legal, administrative and organizational, whereby the Holocaust was perpetrated, as it was seen through German eyes, often by the anonymous clerks whose perceived strong dedication to their duties was central to the efficacy of the industrial project of genocide.

Hilberg refrained from laying emphasis on the suffering of the victims of the Holocaust or their lives in concentration camps. The Nazi program entailed the destruction of all peoples whose existence was deemed incompatible with the world-historical destiny of a pure master race – and to accomplish this project, they had to develop techniques, muster resources, make bureaucratic decisions, organize fields and camps of extermination and recruit cadres capable of executing the Final Solution.

He traced the detailed communication and documentation in the archival records to demonstrate how the operation was carried out. His analysis examined the bureaucratic procedures involved in implementing genocide, allowing the structure of the process to illustrate its consequences.

In this he differed radically from those who had focused on final responsibilities, as for example in the case of his predecessor Gerald Reitlinger's groundbreaking history of the subject. Because of this layered, departmentalized structure of the bureaucracy overseeing the intricate policies of classifying, mustering and deporting victims, individual functionaries saw their roles as distinct from the actual "perpetration" of the Holocaust. Thus, for these reasons, an administrator, clerk or uniformed guard never referred to himself as a "perpetrator".

Hilberg made it clear that such functionaries were quite aware of their involvement in what was a process of destruction. Hilberg's minute documentation constructed a functional analysis of the machinery of genocide, while leaving unaddressed any questions of historical antisemitism, and possible structural elements in Germany's historical-social tradition which might have conduced to the unparalleled industrialization of the European Jewish catastrophe by that country.

Yehuda Bauer, a life-long adversary and friend of Hilberg, – he had assisted him in finally getting access to Yad Vashem's archives – who often clashed polemically with the man he considered "without fault" over what Bauer saw as the latter's failure to deal with the complex dilemmas of Jews caught up in this machinery, recalls often prodding Hilberg on his exclusive focus on the how of the Holocaust rather than the why.

According to Bauer, Hilberg "did not ask the big questions for fear that the answers would be too little" or, as Hilberg says in Claude Lanzmann's film Shoah, "I have never begun by asking the big questions, because I was always afraid that I would come up with small answers".

Hilberg's empirical, descriptive approach to the Holocaust, though it exercised a not fully acknowledged but pervasive influence on the far better-known work of Hannah Arendt, Eichmann in Jerusalem, in turn aroused considerable controversy, not least because of its details concerning the cooperation of Jewish councils in the procedures of evacuation to the camps. (Note: Hilberg counted up to 80 passages in Arendt's book taken verbatim or indirectly from his own work. In reviewing her book, Hugh Trevor-Roper concluded that "behind the whole of Miss Arendt's book stands the overshadowing bulk of Mr. Hilberg's" (Popper 2010).) Hilberg responded graciously to Isaiah Trunk's path-finding research on the Judenräte, which was critical of Hilberg's assessment of the issue.

=== Critical reception ===
Hilberg's study was praised by scholars and the American press. His findings that all of German society was involved in the "destruction process" drew attention. Some scholars argued that Hilberg overlooked Nazi ideology and the nature of the regime. Hilberg's claim that Jews abetted their own persecutors sparked a debate among Jewish scholars and in Jewish press. According to a 2021 study, "the reception of Hilberg's work marks a crucial step in the formation of the Holocaust as part of historical consciousness."

At the time, most historians of the phenomenon subscribed to what would today be called the extreme intentionalist position, where sometime early in his career, Hitler developed a master plan for the genocide of the Jewish people and that everything that happened was the unfolding of the plan. This clashed with the lesson Hilberg had absorbed under Neumann, whose Behemoth: The Structure and Practice of National Socialism (1942/1944) described the Nazi regime as a virtually stateless political order characterized by chronic bureaucratic infighting and turf disputes.

The task Hilberg set for himself was to analyze the way the overall policies of genocide were engineered within the otherwise conflicting politics of Nazi factions. It helped that the Americans classifying the huge number of Nazi documents used, precisely, the categories his future mentor Neumann had employed in his Behemoth study.

Hilberg came to be considered as the foremost representative of what a later generation has called the functionalist school of Holocaust historiography, of which Christopher Browning, whose life was changed by reading Hilberg's book, is a prominent member. (Note: "He read it during a long convalescence from mononucleosis, and it changed his life. 'Some people have religious conversion experiences,' Browning said at a memorial service for Hilberg; 'upon reading Hilberg I had a life-changing academic conversion experience'." (Popper 2010))

The debate is that Intentionalists see "the Holocaust as Hitler's determined and premeditated plan, which he implemented as the opportunity arose," while functionalists see "the Final Solution as an evolution that occurred when other plans proved untenable." Intentionalists argue that the initiative for the Holocaust came from above, while functionalists contend it came from lower ranks within the bureaucracy.

It has often been observed that Hilberg's magnum opus begins with an intentionalist thesis but gradually shifts towards a functionalist position. At the time, this approach raised a few eyebrows but only later did it actually attract pointed academic discussion. (Note: "While in the 1960s and 1970s the stream of historical publications grew steadily, there was still almost no scholarly debate on the Holocaust. Hilberg certainly had sparked a stormy controversy, which was particularly vehement in Israel but his interpretation, derived from Franz Neumann, was not discussed profoundly by his fellow historians." (Jäckel 1998, p. 24)) A further move towards a functionalist interpretation occurred in the revised 1985 edition, in which Hitler is portrayed as a remote figure hardly involved in the machinery of destruction.

The terms functionalist and intentionalist were coined in 1981 by Timothy Mason but the debate goes back to 1969 with the publication of Martin Broszat's The Hitler State in 1969 and Karl Schleunes's The Twisted Road to Auschwitz in 1970. Since most of the early functionalist historians were West German, it was often enough for intentionalist historians, especially for those outside Germany, to note that men such as Broszat and Hans Mommsen had spent their adolescence in the Hitler Youth and then to say that their work was an apologia for National Socialism.

Hilberg was Jewish and an Austrian who had fled to the United States to escape the Nazis and had no Nazi sympathies, which helps explain the vehemence of the attacks by intentionalist historians that greeted the revised edition of The Destruction of the European Jews in 1985.

Hilberg's understanding of the relationship between the leadership of Nazi Germany and the implementers of the genocide evolved from an interpretation based on orders to the Reich Security Main Office (RSHA) and proclaimed by Hermann Göring, to a thesis consistent with Christopher Browning's The Origins of the Final Solution, an account in which initiatives were undertaken by mid-level officials in response to general orders from senior ones.

Such initiatives were broadened by mandates from senior officials and propagated by increasingly informal channels. The experience gained in fulfilling the initiatives fed an understanding in the bureaucracy that radical goals were attainable, progressively reducing the need for direction. As Hilberg put it,

As the Nazi regime developed over the years, the whole structure of decision-making was changed. At first there were laws. Then there were decrees implementing laws. Then a law was made saying, "There shall be no laws." Then there were orders and directives that were written down, but still published in ministerial gazettes. Then there was government by announcement; orders appeared in newspapers. Then there were the quiet orders, the orders that were not published, that were within the bureaucracy, that were oral. Finally, there were no orders at all. Everybody knew what he had to do.

In earlier editions of Destruction, in fact, Hilberg discussed an "order" given by Hitler to have Jews killed, while more recent editions do not refer to a direct command. In a 1999 interview with D.D. Guttenplan, Hilberg commented that he "made this change in the interest of precision about the evidence." Notwithstanding Hilberg's focus on bureaucratic momentum as an indispensable force behind the Holocaust, he maintained that extermination of Jews was one of Hitler's aims: "The primary notion in Germany is that Hitler did it. As it happens, this is also my notion, but I'm not wedded to it" (qtd. in —Guttenplan 2002, p. 303).

This contradicts the thesis advanced by Daniel Goldhagen that the ferocity of German antisemitism is sufficient as an explanation for the Holocaust; Hilberg noted that antisemitism was more vicious in Eastern Europe than in Nazi Germany. Hilberg criticized Goldhagen's scholarship, which he called poor ("his scholarly standard is at the level of 1946") and he was even harsher concerning the lack of primary sources or secondary literature competence at Harvard by those who oversaw the research for Goldhagen's book. Hilberg said, "This is the only reason why Goldhagen could obtain a PhD in political science at Harvard. There was nobody on the faculty who could have checked his work." This remark has been echoed by Yehuda Bauer.

What is most contentious about Hilberg's work, the controversial implications of which influenced the decision by Israeli authorities to deny him access to the Yad Vashem's archives, was his assessment that elements of Jewish society, such as the Judenräte (Jewish Councils), were complicit in the genocide. (Note: "The Germans controlled the Jewish leadership, and that leadership in turn controlled the Jewish community. This system was foolproof. Truly, the Jewish communal organizations had become a self-destructive machine" (Hilberg 1973, pp. 122–125).) (Note: "In Amsterdam as in Warsaw, in Berlin as in Budapest, Jewish officials could be trusted to compile the lists of persons and of their property, to secure money from the deportees to defray the expenses of their deportation and extermination, to keep track of vacated apartments, to supply police forces to help seize Jews and get them on trains, until, as a last gesture, they handed over the assets of the Jewish community in good order for final confiscation." (Arendt 1964, p. 118)) and that this was partly rooted in long-standing attitudes of European Jews, rather than attempts at survival or exploitation. In his own words:

I had to examine the Jewish tradition of trusting God, princes, laws and contracts. ... Ultimately I had to ponder the Jewish calculation that the persecutor would not destroy what he could economically exploit. It was precisely this Jewish strategy that dictated accommodation and precluded resistance.

This part of his work was criticized harshly by many Jews as impious, and a defamation of the dead. His master's thesis sponsor persuaded him to remove this idea from his thesis, though he was determined to restore it. Even his father, on reading his manuscript, was disconcerted.

The result of his approach, and the sharp criticism it aroused in certain quarters, was such, as he records in the same book, that:

It has taken me some time to absorb what I should always have known, that in my whole approach to the study of the destruction of the Jews I was pitting myself against the main current of Jewish thought, that in my research and writing I was pursuing not merely another direction but one which was the exact opposite of a signal that pulsated endlessly through the Jewish community... The philistines in my field are everywhere. I am surrounded by the commonplace, platitudes, and clichés.

== Public role ==
Hilberg was the only scholar interviewed for Claude Lanzmann's Shoah that actually made it into the film (interviews of other scholars, such as theologian Richard L. Rubenstein, remained as outtakes; they can be viewed at the U.S. Holocaust Museum). According to Guy Austin, Hilberg was "a key influence on Lanzmann" in depicting the logistics of the genocide.

He was a strong supporter of the research of Norman Finkelstein during the latter's unsuccessful attempt to secure tenure; of Finkelstein's book The Holocaust Industry, which Hilberg endorsed "with specific regard" to his demonstration that the money claimed to be owed by Swiss banks to Holocaust survivors was greatly exaggerated; and of his critique of Daniel Goldhagen's Hitler's Willing Executioners. Hilberg also made a posthumous appearance in the 2009 film, American Radical: The Trials of Norman Finkelstein.

In regard to claims that a New anti-Semitism was emerging, Hilberg, speaking in 2007, was dismissive. Comparing incidents in recent times with the socially entrenched structural anti-Semitism of the past was like "picking up a few pebbles from the past and throwing them at windows."

== Personal life ==
Hilberg had two children, David and Deborah, by his first wife, Christine Hemenway. After his divorce, in 1980 he married Gwendolyn Montgomery. Deborah moved to Israel when she was 18, acquired dual citizenship, and became a specialist teacher of children with learning disabilities. She wrote about her father's approach to rearing in an article composed on the occasion of the publication of the Hebrew translation of The Destruction of the European Jews, in 2012.

Hilberg was not religious and in his autobiographical reflections stated, "The fact is that I have had no God." In a 2001 interview that addressed the issue of Holocaust denial, he said, "I am an atheist. But there is ultimately, if you don't want to surrender to nihilism entirely, the matter of a [historical] record."

After his second wife's decision, 12 years into their marriage, to convert from Episcopalianism to Judaism, in 1993, Hilberg began to attend services at Ohavi Zedek, a Conservative synagogue in Burlington. What he most esteemed, and identified with in his own tradition, was the ideal of the Jew as "pariah." As he put it in a 1965 essay, "Jews are iconoclasts. They will not worship idols... The Jews are the conscience of the world. They are the father figures, stern, critical, and forbidding."

Though a non-smoker, Hilberg died following a recurrence of lung cancer on August 4, 2007, aged 81, in Williston, Vermont.

== Works ==
- Hilberg, Raul (1971). Documents of Destruction: Germany and Jewry, 1933–1945. Chicago: Quadrangle Books. ISBN 978-0-8129-0192-4.
- — (1988). The Holocaust Today. B.G. Rudolph Lectures in Judaic Studies. Syracuse University Press.
- — (1992). Perpetrators, Victims, Bystanders: The Jewish Catastrophe, 1933–1945. Aaron Asher Books. ISBN 0-06-019035-3.
- — (1995). "The Fate of the Jews in the Cities". In Rubenstein, Richard L.; Rubenstein, Betty Rogers; Berenbaum, Michael (eds.). What kind of God? Essays in honor of Richard L. Rubenstein. University Press of America. pp. 41–50. ISBN 978-0-7618-0036-1.
- — (1996). The Politics of Memory: The Journey of a Holocaust Historian. Chicago: Ivan R. Dee. ISBN 1-56663-428-8.
- — (2000). "The Destruction of the European Jews: Precedents". In Bartov, Omer (ed.). Holocaust: Origins, Implementation, Aftermath. London: Routledge. pp. 21–42. ISBN 0-415-15035-3.
- — (2001). Sources of Holocaust Research: An Analysis. Chicago: Ivan R. Dee. ISBN 978-1-56663-379-6.
- — (2003) [First published 1961]. The Destruction of the European Jews (3rd revised ed.). Yale University Press. ISBN 978-0-300-09592-0.
- — (2019). Pehle, Walter H.; Schlott, René (eds.). The Anatomy of the Holocaust: Selected Works from a Life of Scholarship. New York: Berghahn Books. ISBN 978-1-78920-489-6.

=== with other authors/editors ===
- Hilberg, Raul; Browning, Christopher R.; Hays, Peter (2019). German Railroads, Jewish Souls: The Reichsbahn, Bureaucracy, and the Final Solutions. New York: Berghahn Books. ISBN 978-1-78920-276-2.
- Hilberg, Raul; Staron, Stanislav; Kermisz, Josef, eds. (1999) [first published 1979 by Stein & Day]. The Warsaw Diary of Adam Czerniakow: Prelude to Doom (Reprint ed.). Ivan R Dee. ISBN 978-1-56663-230-0.

== See also ==
- Jan T. Gross

== Sources ==
- Aly, Götz (December 10, 2002). "Geschichte reicht in die Gegenwart. Ein Gespräch mit dem Historiker Raul Hilberg" [History reaches into the present. A conversation with the historian Raul Hilberg]. Neue Zürcher Zeitung (in German).
- Arendt, Hannah (1964) [First published 1963]. Eichmann in Jerusalem. A Report on the Banality of Evil (2nd ed.). Viking Press.
- Austin, Guy (1996). Contemporary French Cinema: An Introduction. Manchester University Press. ISBN 978-0-719-04611-7.
- Bauer, Yehuda (September 2, 2007). "A human being without fault". Haaretz. Archived from the original on February 9, 2018.
- Berenbaum, Michael (August 8, 2007). "A Remembrance of Raul Hilberg". Together: The American Gathering of Jewish Holocaust Survivors & Their Descendants. Archived from the original on August 28, 2016.
- Berenbaum, Michael; Peck, Abraham J. (1998). "Probing the Holocaust: Where We Are, Where We Need to Go". In Berenbaum, Michael; Peck, Abraham J. (eds.). The Holocaust and History: The Known, the Unknown, the Disputed, and the Reexamined. Indiana University Press. pp. 1–4. ISBN 978-0-253-21529-1.
- Berger, Ronald J. (2002). Fathoming the Holocaust: A Social Problems Approach. Transaction Publishers. ISBN 978-0-202-36611-1.
- "Book of Members, 1780–2010: Chapter B" (PDF). American Academy of Arts and Sciences.
- Bortz, Olof (March 8, 2021). "Early Reactions to Raul Hilberg's History of the Holocaust, 1961–7". Journal of Contemporary History. 56 (3): 745–765. doi:10.1177/0022009421993921. ISSN 0022-0094. S2CID 233832767.
- Brown, Adam (2013). "Holocaust Historian and His "Thirty-year War": Hilberg's Controversial Persona". Judging 'Privileged' Jews: Holocaust Ethics, Representation, and the 'Grey Zone'. Berghahn Books. pp. 94–108. ISBN 978-0-857-45992-3.
- Browning, Christopher R. (2007). Raul Hilberg. Vol. 9 (2nd ed.). Encyclopedia Judaica. pp. 100–102. ISBN 978-0-028-65937-4.
- Bush, Jonathan A. (Fall 2010). "Raul Hilberg (1926–2007) In Memoriam". The Jewish Quarterly Review. 100 (4): 661–688. doi:10.1353/jqr.2010.a404350. JSTOR 25781010.
- "The Carolyn and Leonard Miller Center for Holocaust Studies". Vermont: University of Vermont.
- Cesarani, David (November 9, 2007). "Raul Hilberg, 1926 – 2007". Journal of Genocide Research. 9 (4): 517–520. doi:10.1080/14623520701643244. S2CID 216137452.
- Daum, Andreas W.; Föhr, Sherry L. (2015). "Biographies". In Daum, Andreas W.; Lehmann, Hartmut; Sheehan, James J. (eds.). The Second Generation: Émigrés from Nazi Germany as Historians. Berghahn Books. pp. 339–452. ISBN 978-1-782-38993-4.
- Daum, Andreas W.; Lehmann, Hartmut; Sheehan, James J., eds. (2016). The Second Generation: Émigrés from Nazi Germany as Historians. With a Biobibliographic Guide. New York: Berghahn Books. pp. 1–52. ISBN 978-1-78238-985-9.
  - Daum, Andreas. "Refugees from Nazi Germany as Historians: Origins and Migrations, Interests and Identities". In Daum, Lehmann & Sheehan (2016).
- Finkelstein, Norman (August 22, 2007). "Remembering Raul Hilberg". CounterPunch. Archived from the original on September 15, 2007.
- Goodman, Amy; Hilberg, Raul; Shlaim, Avi (May 9, 2007). "It Takes an Enormous Amount of Courage to Speak the Truth When No One Else is Out". Democracy Now!. Pacifica Radio.
- Guttenplan, D. D. (March 12, 2001). "The war on truth". The Guardian. Archived from the original on May 13, 2008.
- Guttenplan, D. D. (2002). The Holocaust on Trial. Norton. ISBN 978-0-393-34605-3.
- Hilberg, Deborah (December 6, 2012). "My father, the Holocaust scholar; the man whose message Israelis wouldn't hear". Haaretz.
- Hilberg, Raul (1973) [First published 1961]. The Destruction of the European Jews. New Viewpoints.
- Hilberg, Raul (1982). Die Vernichtung der europäischen Juden [The Destruction of the European Jews] (in German). Olle & Wolter.
- Hilberg, Raul (2001). "The Holocaust". In Woodruff, Paul; Wilmer, Harry A. (eds.). Facing Evil: Confronting the Dreadful Power Behind Genocide, Terrorism, and Cruelty. Open Court Publishing. pp. 99–111. ISBN 978-0-812-69517-5.
- Hilberg, Raul (Winter–Spring 2007). "Is There a New Anti-Semitism? A Conversation with Raul Hilberg". Logos. 8 (1/2). Archived from the original on February 17, 2018.
- "In Memoriam: Raul Hilberg (1926-2007)". Washington, D.C.: United States Holocaust Memorial Museum.
- Jäckel, Eberhard (1998). "The Holocaust: Where We Are, Where We Need to Go". In Berenbaum, Michael; Peck, Abraham J. (eds.). The Holocaust and History: The Known, the Unknown, the Disputed, and the Reexamined. Indiana University Press. pp. 23–. ISBN 978-0-253-21529-1.
- James, Harold (September 1995). "Schwere moralische Schuld". Die Zeit (in German). Archived from the original on June 12, 2008.
- Joffe, Lawrence (September 25, 2007). "Obituary: Raul Hilberg". The Guardian.
- Martin, Douglas (August 7, 2007). "Raul Hilberg: Historian Who Wrote of the Holocaust as a Bureaucracy, Dies". The New York Times.
- Neumann, Franz Leopold (2009) [First published 1942]. Behemoth: The Structure and Practice of National Socialism. Ivan R. Dee. ISBN 978-1-61578-012-9.
- Neumann, Michael (August 15, 2007a). "In Memoriam: Raul Hilberg". CounterPunch. Archived from the original on August 22, 2009.
- Neumann, Michael (August 15, 2007b). "Raul Hilberg: 'A Mind of a Different Order'". History News Network.
- Popper, Nathaniel (March 31, 2010). "A Conscious Pariah". The Nation.
- "Raul Hilberg". The Times. August 8, 2007. p. 48.
- Reitlinger, Gerald (1953). The Final Solution. Vallentine, Mitchell & Co.
- Roth, J. (2005). Ethics During and After the Holocaust: In the Shadow of Birkenau. Springer. ISBN 978-0-230-51310-5.
- Ryan, Susan (2010). "American Radical: The Trials of Norman Finkelstein by David Ridgenand Nicolas Rossier". Cinéaste. 36 (2): 60–61. JSTOR 41690886.
- Snyder, Timothy (2015). Black Earth: The Holocaust as History and Warning. Crown. ISBN 978-1-101-90346-9.
- Tanner, Adam (August 7, 2007). "Raul Hilberg, pioneer scholar of Holocaust, dies". Reuters.
- Trachtenberg, Barry (2018). The United States and the Nazi Holocaust: Race, Refuge, and Remembrance. Bloomsbury Publishing. ISBN 978-1-472-56720-8.
- Trunk, Isaiah (1996). Judenrat: The Jewish Councils in Eastern Europe Under Nazi Occupation. University of Nebraska Press. ISBN 978-0-803-29428-8.
- Van den Berghe, Gie (1990). "The Incompleteness of a Masterpiece - Raul Hilberg and The Destruction of European Jews" (PDF). BTNG-RBHC. XX1 (1/2): 110–124.
- Woo, Elaine (August 7, 2007). "Raul Hilberg, 81; scholar was an authority on the Holocaust". Los Angeles Times.
- Wyman, David (August 11, 1985). "Managing the Death Machine". The New York Times.
