= Michael J. Thompson =

American political theorist

- Born: 1973 (age 52–53)

Academic background
- Education: City University of New York (PhD)
- Thesis: The Politics of Inequality: A Political History of the Idea of Economic Inequality in America (2005)
- Doctoral advisor: Frances Fox Piven
- Other advisor: Marshall Berman

Academic work
- Era: Contemporary philosophy
- Discipline: Political Philosophy
- Region: Western philosophy
- School or tradition: Continental Philosophy
- Institutions: William Paterson University

Michael J. Thompson (born 1973) is a political theorist at the William Paterson University. He founded and edited the academic journal Logos.

== Selected publications ==
=== Monographs ===
- Thompson, Michael J. (2024-06-05). Descent of the Dialectic: Phronetic Criticism in an Age of Nihilism (1 ed.). New York: Routledge. doi:10.4324/9781003179764. ISBN 978-1-003-17976-4.
- Thompson, Michael J. (2022). Twilight of the Self: The Decline of the Individual in Late Capitalism. Stanford University Press. ISBN 978-1-5036-3244-8.
- Thompson, Michael J. (2007). The Politics of Inequality: A Political History of the Idea of Economic Inequality in America. Columbia University Press. JSTOR 10.7312/thom14074.

=== Editorials ===
- Thompson, Michael J., ed. (2018-04-27). Hegel's Metaphysics and the Philosophy of Politics (1 ed.). 1 [edition]. | New York : Taylor & Francis, 2018. | Series: Routledge studies in nineteenth-century philosophy ; 17: Routledge. doi:10.4324/9781315267838. ISBN 978-1-315-26783-8.
- Thompson, Michael J., ed. (2017). The Palgrave Handbook of Critical Theory. doi:10.1057/978-1-137-55801-5. ISBN 978-1-137-55800-8.
