= Logos (journal) =

Academic journal

Logos: A Journal of Modern Society and Culture
- Language: English
- Edited by: Michael J. Thompson

Publication details
- History: 2002–present
- Publisher: Logos International Foundation (United States)
- Frequency: Quarterly

Standard abbreviations
- ISO 4: Logos

Indexing
- ISSN: 1543-0820
- OCLC no.: 50563100

Links
- Journal homepage; Online archive

Logos: A Journal of Modern Society and Culture is an American academic journal established in 2002 and edited by Michael J. Thompson for the first two decades. Gregory Zucker is now the editor. It is published quarterly and features articles that seek to foster critical dialogues on issues ranging from arts, politics, foreign affairs, culture, social sciences, to the humanities, as well as original fiction and poetry.

Logos was launched "to resurrect eroding democratic principles, concerns with social justice, and the broad-minded cosmopolitanism originally associated with The Enlightenment and then with the great progressive movements of modernity."
