= Gerald Reitlinger =

British art historian

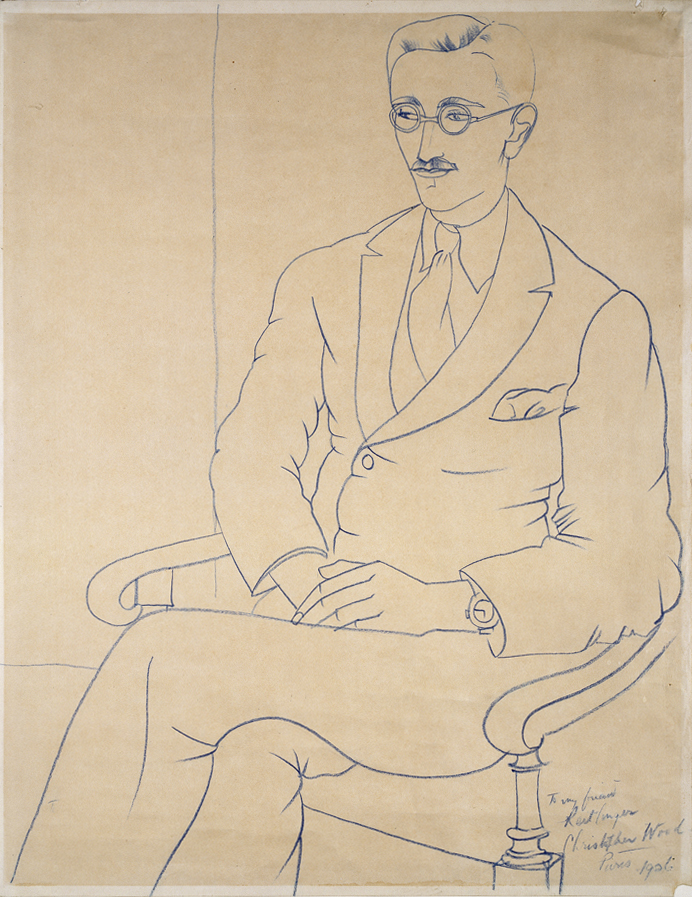
Portrait of Gerald Reitlinger by Christopher Wood, 1926, Ashmolean Museum

Gerald Roberts Reitlinger (1900 – 1978) was a British art historian, especially of Asian ceramics, and a scholar of historical changes in taste in art and their reflection in art prices. After World War II he wrote three large books about Nazi Germany. He was also a painter and collector, mainly of pottery. Reitlinger's major works were The Final Solution (1953), The SS: Alibi of a Nation (1956), and between 1961 and 1970 he published The Economics of Taste in three volumes.

== Career ==
Born in London to the banker Albert Reitlinger and his wife Emma Brunner, Reitlinger was educated at Westminster School in London before a short service with the Middlesex Regiment at the end of World War I. He then studied history, concentrating on art history, at Christ Church, University of Oxford and later at the Slade School and Westminster School of Art, during which time he also edited Drawing and Design, a journal "devoted to art as a national asset" from 1927 to 1929, and exhibited his own paintings in London. He appears under the name of "Reinecker" in Robert Byron's early travel book The Station (1928). In the 1930s he took part in two archaeological excavations in the Near East, one in 1930–31 financed by the Field Museum of Chicago to Kish, now in Iraq, and the second in 1932 to Al-Hirah, financed by Oxford, where he was co-director with David Talbot Rice. These inspired not only his book A Tower of Skulls: a Journey through Persia and Turkish Armenia published in 1932, but also his collecting interest in Islamic pottery.

He travelled extensively and wrote non-fiction works on his trips to China and the Near East. During World War II, he served again as a British soldier, in an anti-aircraft battery and then lectured to troops, before being discharged because of ill-health. Postwar, he wrote articles about art for newspapers and art journals, and with his second wife Eileen Anne Graham Bell he became known for hosting parties for members of London society.

During the 1950s he wrote two books about the Holocaust: The SS: Alibi of a Nation and The Final Solution, both of which achieved large sales. In the latter book, he alleged that Soviet claims of the Auschwitz death toll being 4 million were "ridiculous", and he suggested an alternative figure of 800,000 to 900,000 dead; about 4.2 to 4.5 million was his estimate for the total number of Jewish deaths in the Holocaust. Subsequent scholarship has generally increased Reitlinger's conservative figures for death tolls, though his book was still described in 1979 as being "widely regarded as a definitive account". In January 2020, the BBC gave the Auschwitz death toll as 'at least 1.1 million', of which 'almost one million were Jews'.

In 1961, he published the first of three volumes of The Economics of Taste, a work on the art market from the eighteenth century onwards, mostly in Britain and France, with much detailed information on historic prices, and a very lively commentary, though the reviewer for The Burlington Magazine of Volume III criticised "a tone of provocative flippancy". The tone of the Economics of Taste aroused mixed feelings among reviewers, but they and those reviewing the books on the Nazis found large numbers of points of detail that were incorrect.

Reitlinger was a great fan of the work of London artist Austin Osman Spare, and purchased the sole copy of Spare's 1924 sketchbook of "automatic drawings", The Book of Ugly Ectasy, which contained a series of grotesque creatures. He would later tell Frank Letchford that while he would happily sell his prints by Henri Matisse, he would never part with his Spare drawings.

== Donation and death ==
Reitlinger died of a cerebral hemorrhage at his home, "Woodgate", Beckley in East Sussex. His collection of Islamic pottery, Japanese and Chinese porcelain was donated in 1972 to the Ashmolean Museum at Oxford, where a gallery is named in his honour. The carefully recorded collection had been kept in his house at Beckley, East Sussex, which he also gave to the museum, intending it to be displayed there, and with the condition he lived there for the rest of his life. However the house was severely damaged by fire in February 1978, a few months before his death, though most of the collection was saved.

== Main publications ==
- A Tower of Skulls: a Journey through Persia and Turkish Armenia, London: Duckworth, 1932.
- South of the Clouds: a Winter Ride through Yün-nan, London: Faber & Faber, 1939.
- The Final Solution, the Attempt to Exterminate the Jews of Europe, New York: Beechhurst Press, 1953.
- The SS: Alibi of a Nation, 1922-1945, London: Heinemann, 1956 ISBN 978-0-13-839936-8 reprinted 1981.
- The House Built on Sand, the Conflicts of German Policy in Russia 1939-45, London: Weidenfeld and Nicolson, 1960.
- The Economics of Taste: The Rise and Fall of Picture Prices, 1760-1960, London: Barrie and Rockliffe, 1961.
- The Economics of Taste: The Rise and Fall of Objets D'Art Prices since 1750, London: Barrie and Rockliffe, 1963.
- The Economics of Taste: The Art Market in the 1960's, London: Barrie and Jenkins, 1970.
