= Antisemitism and the New Testament =

Christian views of Judaism in the New Testament

Antisemitism and the New Testament is the discussion of how some Christians' views of Judaism in the New Testament have contributed to discrimination against Jewish people throughout history and in the present day.

The idea that the New Testament is antisemitic is a controversy that has emerged in the aftermath of the Holocaust and is often associated with a thesis put forward by Rosemary Ruether. Debates surrounding various positions partly revolve around how antisemitism is defined, and on scholarly disagreements over whether antisemitism has a monolithic continuous history or is instead an umbrella term covering many distinct kinds of hostility to Jews over history.

Factional agendas underpin the writing of the canonical texts, and the various New Testament documents are windows into the conflict and debates of that period. According to Timothy Johnson, mutual slandering among competing sects was quite strong in the period when these works were composed. The New Testament moreover is an ensemble of texts written over decades and "it is quite meaningless to speak about a single New Testament attitude".

== The New Testament and Christian antisemitism ==
According to Rabbi Michael J. Cook, Professor of Intertestamental and Early Christian Literature at the Hebrew Union College, there are ten themes in the New Testament that have been sources of anti-Judaism and antisemitism:

1. The Jews are culpable for crucifying Jesus — as such they are guilty of deicide.
2. The tribulations of the Jewish people throughout history constitute God's punishment of them for killing Jesus.
3. Jesus originally came to preach only to the Jews, but when they rejected him, he abandoned them for gentiles instead.
4. The Children of Israel were God's original chosen people by virtue of an ancient covenant, but by rejecting Jesus they forfeited their chosenness — and now, by virtue of a New Covenant (or "testament"), Christians have replaced the Jews as God's chosen people, the Church having become the "People of God."
5. The Jewish Bible ("Old" Testament) repeatedly portrays the opaqueness and stubbornness of the Jewish people and their disloyalty to God.
6. The Jewish Bible contains many predictions of the coming of Jesus as the Messiah (or "Christ"), yet the Jews are blind to the meaning of their own Bible.
7. By the time of Jesus' ministry, Judaism had ceased to be a living faith.
8. Judaism's essence is a restrictive and burdensome legalism.
9. Christianity emphasizes love, while Judaism stands for justice and a God of wrath.
10. Judaism's oppressiveness reflects the disposition of Jesus' opponents called "Pharisees" (predecessors of the "rabbis"), who in their teachings and behavior were hypocrites (see Woes of the Pharisees).

Cook believes that both contemporary Jews and contemporary Christians need to reexamine the history of early Christianity, and the transformation of Christianity from a Jewish sect consisting of followers of a Jewish Jesus, to a separate religion often dependent on the tolerance of Rome while proselytizing among gentiles loyal to the Roman Empire, to understand how the story of Jesus came to be recast in an anti-Jewish form as the Gospels took their final form.

Some scholars say that critical verses in the New Testament have been used to incite prejudice and violence against Jewish people. Professor Lillian C. Freudmann, author of Antisemitism in the New Testament (University Press of America, 1994) has published a study of such verses and the effects that they have had in the Christian community throughout history. Similar studies have been made by both Christian and Jewish scholars, including, Professors Clark Williamsom (Christian Theological Seminary), Hyam Maccoby (The Leo Baeck Institute), and Norman A. Beck (Texas Lutheran College).

== New Testament ==
Some verses in the New Testament describe Jews in a positive way, attributing to them salvation and divine love.

According to the New Testament Gospels, Jesus, during the triumphal entry into Jerusalem before Passover, was greeted by a large crowd. Jesus was arrested by Romans and tried by the Sanhedrin. After the trial, Jesus was given over to the Roman authorities, led by Pontius Pilate, who duly tried him again and, at the urging of the people, had him crucified. Mark 14:43–46 records Judas Iscariot betraying Jesus to the Roman authorities, while John 19:11 and Acts 4:27 and 13:27–28 attribute responsibility for Jesus's death to Pilate, the Roman military forces, and the Jewish leadership and populace of Jerusalem at the time.

=== Gospel of Mark ===
According to the Gospel of Mark, the crucifixion of Jesus was authorized by Roman authorities at the insistence of leading Jews (Judeans) from the Sanhedrin. Paul H. Jones writes:

Although Mark depicts all of the Jewish groups united in their opposition to Jesus, his passion narratives are not "overtly" anti-Jewish, since they can be interpreted as falling within the range of "acceptable" intra-Jewish disputes. To some readers, the "cleansing of the Temple" scene (11:15-19) framed by the "withered fig tree" pericopes confirms God's judgment against the Jews and their Temple. Most likely, however, the story explains [to] this small sect of Jesus followers that survived the Roman-Jewish War why God permitted the destruction of the Temple. It is an in-house interpretation and, therefore, not anti-Jewish. Likewise, the parable of the vineyard (12:1-12), by which the traditional allegorical interpretation casts the tenants as the Jews, the murdered heir as Jesus, and the owner as God, must be set within the context of an intra-Jewish dispute.

=== Gospel of Matthew ===
The Gospel of Matthew is often evaluated as the most Jewish of the canonical gospels, and yet it is sometimes said that it is anti-Judaic or antisemitic.

The Gospel of Matthew has given readers the impression that his hostility toward Jews increases as his narrative progresses, culminating in chapter 23. In chapter 21, the parable of the vineyard, which is strikingly similar to Isaiah 5:1-30, is followed by the great "stone" text, an early Christological interpretation of Psalm 118: "The stone that the builders rejected has become the cornerstone". The Old Testament allusions appear to suggest that the author thought God would call to account Israel's leaders for maltreating Christ, and that the covenant will pass to the gentiles who follow Christ, a view that arose in intersectarian polemics in Judaism between the followers of Christ and the Jewish leadership. Then, in chapters 23 and 24, three successive hostile pericopes are recorded. First, a series of "woes" are pronounced against the Pharisees:

you testify against yourselves that you are descendants of those who murdered the prophets...You snakes, you brood of vipers! How can you escape being sentenced to hell?

— Matthew 23:31-33

Certain passages that speak of the destruction of Jerusalem contain elements interpreted as indications of Matthew's anti-Judaic attitudes. Jesus is said to have lamented over the capital: "Jerusalem, Jerusalem, the city that kills the prophets and stones those who are sent to it...See, your house is left to you, desolate". Again, Jesus is made to predict the demise of the Temple: "Truly I tell you, not one stone will be left here upon another; all will be thrown down". Such visions of an end to the old Temple may be read as embodying the replacement theology, according to which Christianity supersedes Judaism.

The culmination of this rhetoric, and arguably the one verse that has caused more Jewish suffering than any other second-Testament passage, is the uniquely Matthean attribution to the Jewish people:

His [Jesus's] blood be on us and on our children!

— Matthew 27:25

Some have interpreted this "blood guilt" text to mean that all Jews, of Jesus' time and forever afterward, accept responsibility for the death of Jesus. Shelly Matthews writes:

In Matthew, as in many books of the New Testament, the idea that Christ followers are persecuted is pervasive. Blessings are pronounced on those who are persecuted for righteousness sake in the Sermon on the Mount; the woes against the Pharisees in Matthew 23 culminate in predictions that they will "kill and crucify, flog in synagogues, and pursue from town to town;" the parable of the banquet in Matthew 22 implies that servants of the king will be killed by those to whom they are sent.

Douglas Hare noted that the Gospel of Matthew avoids sociological explanations for persecution:

Only the theological cause, the obduracy of Israel is of interest to the author. Nor is the mystery of Israel's sin probed, whether in terms of dualistic categories or in terms of predestinarianism. Israel's sin is a fact of history which requires no explanation.

The term "Jews" in the Gospel of Matthew is applied to those who deny the resurrection of Jesus and believe that the disciples stole Jesus's corpse.

=== Gospel of John ===
In the Gospel of John, the word Ἰουδαῖοι, usually translated the Jews, is used 63 times, in a hostile sense 31 times, and no distinctions are made between Jewish groups. The Sadducees, for example, prominent elsewhere, are not distinguished. The enemies of Jesus are described collectively as the "Ioudaioi", in contradistinction to the other evangelists, who do not generally ascribe to the "Ioudaioi" collectively calls for the death of Jesus. In the other three texts, the plot to put Jesus to death is always presented as coming from a small group of priests and rulers, the Sadducees. The Gospel of John is the primary source of the image of "the Jews" acting collectively as the enemy of Jesus, which later became fixed in Christian minds.

In several places, John's gospel also associates the "Ioudaioi" with darkness and with the devil. In John 8:37-39; 44–47, Jesus says, speaking to a group of Pharisees:

I know that you are descendants of Abraham; yet you seek to kill me, because my word finds no place in you. I speak of what I have seen with my Father, and you do what you have heard from your father. They answered him, "Abraham is our father." Jesus said to them, "If you were Abraham's children, you would do what Abraham did. ... You are of your father the devil, and your will is to do your father's desires. He was a murderer from the beginning, and has nothing to do with the truth, because there is no truth in him. When he lies, he speaks according to his own nature, for he is a liar and the father of lies. But, because I tell the truth, you do not believe me. Which of you convicts me of sin? If I tell the truth, why do you not believe me? He who is of God hears the words of God; the reason why you do not hear them [that] is you are not of God.

Although the modern consensus is that the term "Ioudaioi" (Jews) in John refers exclusively to religious authorities, the basis for this statement has been challenged, and John's use of the term "Ioudaioi" remains a complex and debated area of biblical scholarship, though it is accepted that it is not a case of antisemitism. New Testament scholar J.G. Dunn writes:

The Fourth Evangelist is still operating within a context of intra-Jewish factional dispute, although the boundaries and definitions themselves are part of that dispute. It is clear beyond doubt that once the Fourth Gospel is removed from that context, and the constraints of that context, it was all too easily read as an anti-Jewish polemic and became a tool of anti-semitism. But it is highly questionable whether the Fourth Evangelist himself can fairly be indicted for either anti-Judaism or anti-semitism.

Reflecting the consensus that John's use of the term refers strictly to Jewish religious authorities, some modern translations, such as Today's New International Version, remove the term "Jews" and replace it with more specific terms to avoid antisemitic connotations. For example, Messianic Bibles, as well as the Jesus Seminar, often translate this as "Judeans” (residents of Judea) in contrast to residents of Galilee.

==== Later commentary ====
Successive generations of Christians read in the Gospel of John the collective guilt of Jews, universally and in all generations, in the death of Christ. John's use of the collective expression "the Jews" is likely explained by the historical circumstances and audience for which he wrote. With the destruction of the Temple in 70 AD, the Jewish priesthood, and thus the class of the Sadducees, was massacred and thus ceased to exist, due to its role in the First Jewish–Roman War. As John wrote his Gospel after these events for a Gentile audience, he spoke generically of Jews rather than specifying a group within Judaism that no longer existed and would have been unfamiliar to his readers.

=== First Epistle to the Thessalonians ===
Paul writes in 1 Thessalonians 2:14-16 as follows:

For you, brothers and sisters, became imitators of the churches of God in Christ Jesus that are in Judea, for you suffered the same things from your own compatriots as they did from the Jews, who killed both the Lord Jesus and the prophets, and drove us out; they displease God and oppose everyone by hindering us from speaking to the Gentiles so that they may be saved. Thus they have constantly been filling up the measure of their sins; but God's wrath has overtaken them at last.

The text appears somewhat anomalous compared to the general tone of thanksgiving, in that there is a diatribe against persecutors identified as Jews. The text appears to flagrantly contradict what Paul writes in chapters 9 to 11 of his Epistle to the Romans. This has led several scholars to question its authenticity and suggest that it is a interpolation. According to Pieter Willem van der Horst, there is an instance of antisemitic statements in one of the Pauline epistles; David Luckensmeyer maintains that it was not written with the intent to condemn all Jews, Paul's letters reveal someone who lived his life within Judaism, but did at the same time have an antisemitic effect. F. F. Bruce called it an 'indiscriminate anti-Jewish polemic' mirroring Graeco-Roman pagan attitudes to the Jews. Gene Green, Ernest Best, T. Holtz, Amy Downey variously say that it resonates with Old Testament themes, plays on Jewish fears of being the "privileged people of God" and typical of an argumentative style shared by Greeks and Jews alike and thus, in Downey's words, exemplifying an intracultural clash between Paul the Jew and Jewish leaders opposing the propagation of Gospel ideas in both Judea and Thessalonia.

=== Epistle to the Hebrews ===
Most scholars consider the Epistle to the Hebrews to have been written for Christians who were tempted to return to Judaism. Lillian Freudmann thinks that it in trying to argue the superiority of Christianity to Judaism, it twisted Old Testament passages in a way that transmitted an anti-Torah antisemitism. John Gager reads it as a polemic against Judaism, not the Jewish people, and regards it as the most important anti-Judaizing text of early Christianity. Samuel Sandmel says that rather than vilifying Judaism or the Jews of that age, the Epistle to the Hebrews is an argument for the supersessionist notion that Christianity is the pinnacle of ancient Judaism. William L. Lane dismissed the idea that it contains an anti-Judaic polemic, its primary concern being simply to say that the Old Testament prophecies had been fulfilled. Those who see in its discontinuities antisemitism are wrong. William Hagner said: There may be anti-Judaism, but no antagonism for Jews. While it promotes supersessionism, it venerates the Hebrew saints, for Donald Bloesch, and therefore what it is exhorting is the replacement of Jewish institutions, not Jews. For Timothy Johnson, Christianity had to struggle to survive amid a majority of sects that were not Messianic, and whatever slander there is, is to be understood as the rhetoric of a marginal group against the majority of Jews. Such rhetorical vehemence was common in antiquity in religious and philosophical disputes.

=== Book of Revelation ===
In Revelation 2:9 and 3:9, Jesus refers to a "synagogue of Satan" (συναγωγή τοῦ Σατανᾶ). Revelation 2:9 states:

I know your tribulation and your poverty (but you are rich) and the slander of those who say that they are Jews and are not, but are a synagogue of Satan. (Note: Revelation 2:9: Οἶδά σου τὴν θλῖψιν καὶ τὴν πτωχείαν, ἀλλὰ πλούσιος εἶ, καὶ τὴν βλασφημίαν ἐκ τῶν λεγόντων Ἰουδαίους εἶναι ἑαυτούς, καὶ οὐκ εἰσίν ἀλλὰ συναγωγὴ τοῦ Σατανᾶ.)

At 3:9 one reads:

Behold, I will make those of the synagogue of Satan, who say that they are Jews and are not, but lie—behold, I will make them come and bow down before your feet, and learn that I have loved you. (Note: Revelation 3:9: ἰδοὺ διδῶ ἐκ τῆς συναγωγῆς τοῦ Σατανᾶ, τῶν λεγόντων ἑαυτοὺς Ἰουδαίους εἶναι, καὶ οὐκ εἰσὶν ἀλλὰ ψεύδονται· ἰδοὺ ποιήσω αὐτοὺς ἵνα ἥξουσιν καὶ προσκυνήσουσιν ἐνώπιον τῶν ποδῶν σου, καὶ γνῶσιν ὅτι ἐγὼ ἠγάπησά σε.)

There is no certainty about who are those claiming falsely to be Jews: whether they are Jews hostile to gentiles, Jewish Christians persecuted by a Jewish majority, Jews who are practicing a "false" form of Judaism or gentiles feigning to be Jews. The traditional interpretation upheld until recently by a majority of scholars took this to denote Jews hostile to Christians, and specifically to the Jewish communities of Smyrna (2:9) and Philadelphia (3:9). In the Smyrna passage, according to Koester, those claiming to be Jews probably bore in their traits the usual markers of kinship, circumcision, dietary restriction, and Sabbath observance, but are taken to task for denouncing the Christian community to the Roman authorities to get them arrested.

This has recently been questioned by Elaine Pagels, David Frankfurter, Heinrich Kraft and John W. Marshall. Pagels, reviewing the literature, says that the author of Revelation, John of Patmos, saw himself as a Jew, not a Christian. Unlike the other evangelists who blame Jews for Christ's death, the author of Revelation, drawing on old patterns of late Jewish eschatological imagery, assigns responsibility for his death to Romans and says they are abetted by an internal enemy who feign to be God's people while acting as agents of Satan, a theme also present in the literature of the Qumran sectaries. Pagels identifies most of these internal enemies as converts to the Pauline doctrine and teachings prevailing among gentiles. Taking the passage in Revelation literally, 3:9 would refer to Gentiles upstaging Jewish followers of Jesus, feigning to be more Jewish than Jews themselves. Paul Duff, on the other hand, assumes they are Jews, like John himself, but Jews who are hostile to the Jesus movement. David Frankfurter has revived the old argument of Ferdinand Baur by endorsing the view that, in fact, the members of Satan's synagogue are mostly gentiles, claiming Israel's legacy while rebuffing religious practices that are obligatory for Jews. Even those who, like David Aune, consider that the phrase indicates Jews, not Gentiles, allow that the Book of Revelation is virtually devoid of traces of the polemics between Christians and Jews typical of those times. Pagels concludes that the evidence weighs in favour of reading the 'synagogue of Satan' as referring to gentile converts to the Pauline version of the Jesus movement, who denominate themselves as 'those of Christ/Christians', a terminology never used by John of Patmos.

It has been said that the idea of a Jewish Antichrist developed from these verses.

== Modern responses ==
In the decree Nostra aetate in 1965, Pope Paul VI declared that

True, the Jewish authorities and those who followed their lead pressed for the death of Christ; still, what happened in His passion cannot be charged against all the Jews, without distinction, then alive, nor against the Jews of today. Although the Church is the new people of God, the Jews should not be presented as rejected or accursed by God, as if this followed from the Holy Scriptures.

Norman A. Beck, professor of theology and classical languages at Texas Lutheran University, has proposed that Christian lectionaries remove what he calls "... the specific texts identified as most problematic ...". Beck identifies what he deems to be offensive passages in the New Testament and indicates the instances in which these texts or portions thereof are included in major lectionary series.

Daniel Goldhagen, former associate professor of political science at Harvard University, also suggested in his book A Moral Reckoning that the Roman Catholic Church should change its doctrine and the accepted Biblical canon to excise statements he labels as antisemitic — he counts some 450 such passages in the Synoptic Gospels and Acts of the Apostles alone — to indicate that "The Jews' way to God is as legitimate as the Christian way".

The Church of England Faith and Order Commission document God's Unfailing Word: Theological and Practical Perspectives on Christian-Jewish Relations addresses the matter of New Testament texts and connection to antisemitism: "Varying theological emphases within the Church of England regarding the doctrine of scriptural interpretation and authority may have a bearing on how such concerns are addressed."

James Dunn has said that the New Testament contributed toward subsequent antisemitism in the Christian community.

== Academic views ==
A. Roy Eckardt, a writer in the field of Jewish-Christian relations, said that the foundation of antisemitism and responsibility for the Holocaust lies ultimately in the New Testament. Eckardt insisted that Christian repentance must include a reexamination of basic theological attitudes toward Jews and the New Testament in order to deal effectively with antisemitism.

According to Louis Feldman, the term "antisemitism" is an "absurdity which the Jews took over from the Germans." He thinks the proper term is anti-Judaism. The distinction between anti-Judaism and antisemitism is often made, or challenged, with regard to early Christian hostility to Jews: some, notably Gavin I. Langmuir, prefer anti-Judaism, which implies a theological enmity. They say that the concept of antisemitism "makes little sense" in the nascent days of the Christian religion and that it would not emerge until later. In this context, the term antisemitism implies the secular biological race theories of modern times. Amy-Jill Levine says that the New Testament is not antisemitic based on the usual definitions of the term, and to what extent the New Testament is anti-Jewish remains debated, though it has historically been interpreted as such. Peter Schäfer prefers the word Judaeophobia for pagan hostility to Jews, but considers the word antisemitism, even if anachronistic, synonymous with this term, while adding that Christian anti-Judaism eventually was crucial to what later became antisemitism. Dunn says that the various New Testament expressions of anger and hurt by a minority puzzled by the refusal of a majority to accept their claims about Jesus the Jew reflect inner tensions between Jewish communities not yet unified by rabbinical Judaism, and a Christianity not yet detached from Judaism. The Greek word Ioudaioi (Ancient Greek: Ἰουδαῖοι) used throughout the New Testament translates to "Jews", more specifically to "Judeans". The term Hellenistes (Greek: Ελληνιστές) (Note: Hellenes on the other hand (Greek: Έλληνες) is the ethnonym for ethnic Greeks or Gentiles in general (non-Jewish people).) refers to the Hellenized Jews.

== See also ==
- Anti-Judaism in early Christianity
- Christian–Jewish reconciliation
- Christianity and Judaism
- Origins of Christianity
