= A Moral Reckoning =

2002 book by Daniel Jonah Goldhagen

- Cover of the first edition
- Author: Daniel Jonah Goldhagen
- Language: English
- Subject: The Holocaust
- Publisher: Knopf (1st edition, hardcover)
- Publication date: October 29, 2002 (1st edition, hardcover)
- Publication place: United States
- Media type: Print (Hardcover and Paperback)
- Pages: 384 pages (1st edition, hardcover)
- ISBN: 0-375-41434-7 (1st edition, hardcover)
- OCLC: 49525719
- Dewey Decimal: 940.53/18/08822 21
- LC Class: BX1378 .G57 2002

A Moral Reckoning: The Role of the Catholic Church in the Holocaust and Its Unfulfilled Duty of Repair is a 2003 book by the political scientist Daniel Jonah Goldhagen, previously the author of Hitler's Willing Executioners (1996). Goldhagen examines the Roman Catholic Church's role in the Holocaust and offers a review of scholarship in English addressing what he argues is antisemitism throughout the history of the Church, which he claims contributed substantially to the persecution of the Jews during World War II.

Goldhagen recommends several significant steps that might be taken by the Church to make reparation for its alleged role. A Moral Reckoning received mixed reviews and was the subject of considerable controversy regarding allegations of inaccuracies and anti-Catholic bigotry.

== Background ==
Goldhagen, the son of a Holocaust survivor, first engaged in serious academic discourse concerning the Holocaust following a lecture he attended as a student at Harvard University in 1983. He gained prominence in the field with the publication of 1996's Hitler's Willing Executioners, which met acclaim and controversy, particularly in Germany. The Journal for German and International Politics awarded him the Democracy Prize in 1997. In awarding the prize for the first time since 1990, the Journal wrote "Because of the penetrating quality and the moral power of his presentation, Daniel Goldhagen has greatly stirred the consciousness of the German public."

Invited by The New Republic to review several books concerning Pope Pius XII and the Holocaust, Goldhagen was inspired to write a review of the literature concerning the question of the "culture of antisemitism" in the Catholic Church prior to Vatican II and its impact on the Holocaust. His impressions first appeared as a lengthy essay in the January 21, 2002, edition of The New Republic entitled "What Would Jesus Have Done? Pope Pius XII, the Catholic Church, and the Holocaust" before their publication by Knopf in extended book form as A Moral Reckoning.

== Overview ==
In The New York Times, book reviewer Geoffrey Wheatcroft said that A Moral Reckoning (2003) presents an indictment of the Roman Catholic Church comparable to Goldhagen's indictment of Germany in Hitler's Willing Executioners (1996), saying: "both as an international institution under the leadership of Pope Pius XII (1939–58), and at national levels in many European countries, the Church was deeply implicated in the appalling genocide.... Just as Germans had been carefully taught to hate the Jews, to the point that they could readily torment and kill them, so had Catholics"; that author Goldhagen "sees a deep vein of Jew-hatred ingrained within Catholic tradition; and he does not think that there was any difference of kind, between that old religious Jew-hatred and the murderous racial antisemitism of the twentieth century".

In 2003, in The Atlantic magazine, interviewer Jennie Rothenberg Gritz quoted Goldhagen saying that "moral issues" are the "principal substance" of A Moral Reckoning, that his concern was a "consideration of culpability and repair". In a letter to the editor of The New York Times, Goldhagen said that "the book's real content" is in "setting forth general principles for moral repair from which I derive concrete proposals for the Church". Donald Dietrich, author of God and Humanity in Auschwitz: Jewish-Christian Relations and Sanctioned Murder, and a Boston College professor of Theology specializing in Holocaust studies, said that Goldhagen "asks the Catholic Church a question: 'What must a religion of love and goodness do to confront its history of hatred and harm, to make amends with its victims, and to right itself so that it is no longer the source of hatred and harm that, whatever its past, it would no longer endorse?' He has attempted to analyze the moral culpability of Catholics and their leaders, to judge the actors, and to discern how today's Catholics can make material, political and moral restitution."

Goldhagen's book suggests that the Church owes financial reparation and support to Jews and the State of Israel and should change its doctrine and the accepted Biblical canon to excise statements he labels as antisemitic and to indicate that "The Jews' way to God is as legitimate as the Christian way." Failing this, the author proposes disclaimers in every Christian Bible to annotate antisemitic passages and acknowledge them as having led to injury against Jews.

== Legal controversy ==
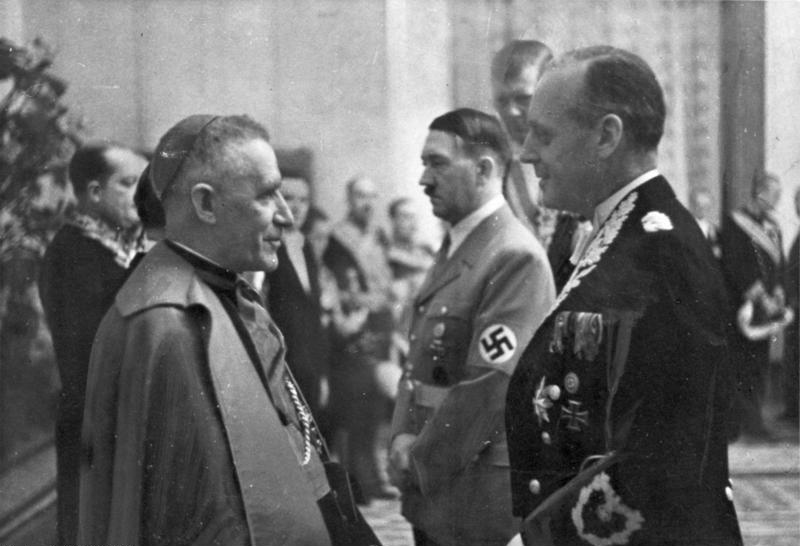
Apostolic Nuncio to Germany Cesare Orsenigo with Adolf Hitler and Joachim von Ribbentrop

In 2002, the book's German publisher—Siedler Verlag, a sister company of Random House—was sued by the archdiocese of Munich as a result of the misidentification of a photograph, falsely asserting the presence of Michael Cardinal von Faulhaber, whom Rabbi David G. Dalin calls "a famous opponent of the Nazis", at a Nazi rally. The picture actually depicted Apostolic Nuncio to Germany Cesare Orsenigo participating in a May Day labor parade in Munich—not a Nazi rally in Berlin.

In October 2002, the district court of Munich required the publisher to withdraw the book or correct the copies, but in spite of the disclosure of the error in Germany, the book was released in English by Knopf with the error intact. A representative of the archdiocese said with regards to the mislabeled photograph that "The implication is that Cardinal Faulhaber was an associate of the Nazis. When one writes about these things, one should be more precise about the truth."

Goldhagen, who acknowledged that the photo wrongly identified the figure and location, described the lawsuit as a crude diversionary tactic to displace focus from the real issues. Goldhagen stated that the photograph was misidentified by the United States Holocaust Memorial Museum, from which the picture was obtained. Religious commentator and former priest Paul Collins characterized the mislabeling of the photograph as inexcusable, while The New York Times reported that most historians agreed that "a single mislabeled photo in a 346-page book is a minor error."

== Critical reception ==
Although A Moral Reckoning was favorably reviewed in The Spectator, Kirkus Reviews, and the San Francisco Chronicle, and given a generally favorable overview ahead of an interview in The Atlantic, it was also subject to substantial criticism, even among some of those reviewers who found aspects of the work praiseworthy. The International Social Science Review, which described the book as a "seminal work" and a "valuable introduction to and synthesis of the literature on church and state during the Holocaust", also indicated that the message of the book is "diluted by stylistic problems". The New York Times reviewer Geoffrey Wheatcroft praised Goldhagen's assembly of "an impressive body of evidence" but criticized his repetitiveness, his "misinterpreting the record" and his use of it to promote a particular view, which Wheatcroft deems appropriate for an advocate but reprehensible in a historian. Dietrich, whose review lauded Goldhagen for asking "many of the proper seminal questions", mirrored Wheatcroft's concerns about repetitiveness, misunderstandings and polemics, specifically stating: "The careful reader must closely read the footnotes since in many cases he contextually and theologically nuances his book's claims only there."

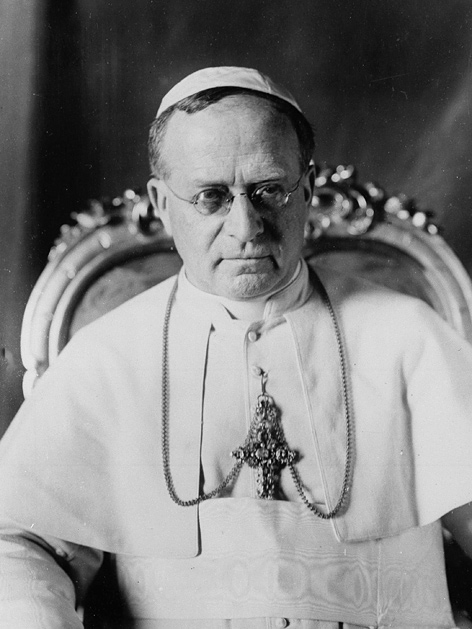
Pope Pius XI

John Cornwell, author of Hitler's Pope: The Secret History of Pius XII (1999), praised Daniel Goldhagen's "excellent job in exposing the propagandistic hagiography of recent defenders of Pius XII, especially their tendency to confuse diplomatic eulogy with historical fact", but said that Goldhagen errs in identifying a key Vatican figure as an antisemite, a misrepresentation he thinks "can only provide ammunition for the Pius XII lobby". The journalist Gritz noted that "[Goldhagen] does not cushion his criticisms of the Church in diplomatic language", and that "even philosophy professor John K. Roth, who favorably reviewed A Moral Reckoning in the Los Angeles Times, said that the adjectives "unpretentious ... indecisive ... moderate ... patient" do not come to mind when reading Goldhagen. Another book review in The New York Times said that A Moral Reckoning is an "impressive and disturbing bill of indictment against" the Roman Catholic Church, yet its imbalanced perspective results in "turning history into a kind of cudgel".

In summer of 2002, before its publication, Ronald Rychlak, author of Hitler, the War, and the Pope, decried it as factually incorrect, releasing a lengthy catalog of corrections to Goldhagen's essay "What Would Jesus Have Done?" After the book's publication, Rychlak published a review in the journal Totalitarian Movements and Political Religions, again pointing out factual errors and criticizing the book's tone and conclusions. Following the book's publication, Rabbi Dalin and Joseph Bottum, later co-authors along with William Doino of The Pius War: Responses to the Critics of Pius XII, in separate articles for The Weekly Standard denounced it as failing "to meet even the minimum standards of scholarship" and "filled with factual errors". In his review, Paul Collins indicated that the purpose of the book was undermined by poor editing, incoherence and redundancy. Mark Riebling of National Review, who described himself as an admirer of Goldhagen's first book, called A Moral Reckoning "a 352-page exercise in intellectual bad manners" and "a spree of intellectual wilding".

In reply to the charge of historical inaccuracy, Daniel Goldhagen said that the "central contours" of A Moral Reckoning: The Role of the Catholic Church in the Holocaust and its Unfulfilled Duty of Repair (2002) are accurate, because the book's title and first page communicate its purpose of moral analysis, not historical analysis. He stated that he has invited to no avail European Church representatives to present their own historical account in discussing morality and reparation.

Opponents labelled Goldhagen as an "anti-Catholic", as promoting an anti-Catholic agenda. Bottum wrote that its "errors of fact combine to create a set of historical theses about the Nazis and the Catholic Church so tendentious that not even Pius XII's most determined belittlers have dared to assert them. And, in Goldhagen's final chapters, the bad historical theses unite to form a complete anti-Catholicism the likes of which we haven't seen since the elderly H. G. Wells decided Catholicism was the root of all evil". In the Catholic News Service, Eugene J. Fisher, the Associate Director of the Secretariat for Ecumenical and Interreligious Affairs of the U.S. Conference of Catholic Bishops, said that Goldhagen avoided original research, as "such methodological and factual considerations would definitely get in the way of the demonic portrait of the Church that he seeks to paint".

In the book The New Anti-Catholicism: The Last Acceptable Prejudice, Philip Jenkins said that A Moral Reckoning, along with anti-Catholic conspiracy theories and other "anti-Church historical polemic", belongs to the pseudohistory category of books about anti-Catholic "mythic history", historical manipulation, and national demonization, such as the Black Legend about Spain, and said that publishers publish such books because they sell many copies, not because they mean to "destroy or calumniate Catholicism". Furthermore, the Catholic League for Religious and Civil Rights president William A. Donohue said that Daniel Goldhagen "hasn't a clue about Catholicism", and that he "separates himself" from other critics of Pope Pius XII "by demanding that the Catholic Church implode: he wants the Church to refigure its teachings, liturgy, and practices to such an extent that no one would recognize a trace of Catholicism in this new construction. That is why Goldhagen is not simply against Pope Pius XII: he is an inveterate anti-Catholic bigot." Moreover, Rabbi Dalin accused Goldhagen of engaging in a "misuse of the Holocaust to advance [his] ... anti-Catholic agenda".

== Partial publication history ==
- Goldhagen, Daniel Jonah (October 29, 2002). A Moral Reckoning. Alfred A. Knopf. p. 384. ISBN 0-375-41434-7. 1st edition hardcover.
- Goldhagen, Daniel Jonah (November 3, 2002). A Moral Reckoning. Little, Brown. p. 384. ISBN 0-349-11693-8. Hardcover.
- Goldhagen, Daniel Jonah (December 11, 2003). A Moral Reckoning. Abacus. p. 496. ISBN 0-316-72446-7. Paperback.
- Goldhagen, Daniel Jonah (December 30, 2003). A Moral Reckoning. Vintage Books. p. 416. ISBN 0-375-71417-0. Paperback.

== See also ==
- Antisemitism in the New Testament
- Pope Pius XII and the Holocaust
