= David Schoenbaum =

American historian

- Born: 1935 (age 90–91); Milwaukee, Wisconsin
- Education: University of Wisconsin–Madison (B.A.); Oxford University (D.Phil., 1965)
- Occupations: Social scientist, historian, author, professor

David Schoenbaum (born 1935) is an American historian writing on a wide range of subjects, including German political history (in the periods of World War I, Nazism, the 1960s, and contemporary politics), European and global cultural history, and U.S. diplomatic history.

== Life and work ==
Schoenbaum, for many years a professor of history at the University of Iowa, is best known for his 1966 book, Hitler's Social Revolution. He received his BA from the University of Wisconsin–Madison, and, in 1965, his D.Phil. from Oxford University. During his tenure at the University of Iowa, he published additional books on German history and US-Israeli relations. He retired from the University of Iowa in 2008. His most recent book is The Violin: A Social History of the World's Most Versatile Instrument, published by W. W. Norton and Company in December 2012.

In Hitler's Social Revolution Schoenbaum challenged the then prevailing notion that the National Socialist regime was a backwards looking, reactionary anti-modernizing dictatorship, and instead argued that, in effect at least, the Nazi regime was a modernizing dictatorship. Schoenbaum argued that the Nazi revolution was a "double revolution...of means and ends". In order to accomplish its foreign policy goals, namely war, the Nazi regime was forced to encourage modernization and industrialization, despite the anti-modernist nature of Nazi ideology. Schoenbaum wrote that "The revolution of ends was ideological—war against bourgeois and industrial society. The revolution of means was its reciprocal. It was bourgeois and industrial, since in an industrial age even a war against industrial society must be fought with industrial means and bourgeois are necessary to fight the bourgeoise."

In Schoenbaum's view, there were two sorts of social realities, namely "objective" and "interpreted social reality". By "objective social reality", Schoenbaum argued the Nazi regime had achieved greater degree of industrialization and urbanization, while by "interpreted social reality", the Nazi regime was able to break down the traditional lines of class, religion and regional loyalties to achieve an unparalleled degree of unity amongst the German people. In particular, Schoenbaum argued that the Nazi regime was able to destroy the traditional class barriers that had divided German society, and for most Germans, the increased social mobility offered by the Nazi regime was sufficient compensation for the destruction of democracy. Schoenbaum's book proved to be highly influential, and set off an important debate about both the intentions and the effects of Nazi social policies, and the nature of social change during the Nazi period. Some historians such as Ian Kershaw have criticized Schoenbaum's work for placing too much reliance on what Kershaw considers to be subjective and impressionistic evidence.

Schoenbaum has written books about other aspects of modern German history. In 1968, Schoenbaum published a book about the Spiegel Affair scandal of 1962, in which he sought to set the affair into the context of the history of the Federal Republic and the wider context of German history. His 1982 book Zabern 1913 concerned the political fall-out from the Saverne Affair in 1913. Schoenbaum argued that the affair revealed different aspects of the German Empire, and argued that the Zabern Affair was the exception that proved that the rule that Imperial Germany was no more or less liberal or illiberal then other Western nations. In 1996, Schoenbaum wrote a highly critical book review in the National Review of Daniel Goldhagen's bestseller Hitler's Willing Executioners where he charged Goldhagen with grossly simplifying the question of the degree and virulence of German antisemitism, and of only selecting evidence that supported his thesis. Furthermore, Schoenbaum complained that Goldhagen did not take a comparative approach with Germany placed in isolation, thereby falsely implying that Germans and Germans alone were the only nation that saw widespread antisemitism. Finally, Schoenbaum argued that Goldhagen failed to explain why the anti-Jewish boycott of April 1, 1933 was relatively ineffective or why the Kristallnacht needed to be organized by the Nazis as opposed to being a spontaneous expression of German popular antisemitism. Using an example from his family history, Schoenbaum wrote that his mother-in-law, a Polish Jew who lived in Germany between 1928 and 1947, never considered the National Socialists and the Germans synonymous, and expressed regret that Goldhagen could not see the same.

One of Schoenbaum's few works outside of German history is The United States and the State of Israel, a diplomatic history of relations between Israel and the United States from 1948 to 1993.

== Selected publications ==
- The Lives of Isaac Stern. New York, New York: W.W.Norton & Co, 2020. ISBN 978-0-393-63461-7
- The Violin: A Social History of the World's Most Versatile Instrument, New York, New York: W. W. Norton & Company, December 2012. ISBN 9780393084405
- with Elizabeth Pond, The German Question and Other German Questions, New York: St. Martin's Press, Oxford: In association with St. Antony's College, 1996, ISBN 0-312-16048-8.
- The United States and the State of Israel, New York: Oxford University Press, 1993, ISBN 0-19-504577-7.
- Zabern 1913: Consensus Politics in Imperial Germany, London: George Allen & Unwin, 1982, ISBN 0-04-943025-4.
- The Spiegel Affair, Garden City, New York: Doubleday, 1968.
- Hitler's Social Revolution: Class and Status in Nazi Germany, 1933–1939, Garden City, NY Doubleday, 1966.
- Another Ovation for Joachim (Who?). The New York Times, 2007-8-12
