= Christoph Dieckmann =

Christoph Dieckmann may refer to:

- Christoph Dieckmann (beach volleyball) (born 1976), German beach volleyball player
- Christoph Dieckmann (writer) (born 1956), German journalist, commentator and author
- Christoph Dieckmann (historian) (born 1960), German historian and author
