= Wlodzimierz Ksiazek =

Polish artist (1951–2011)

- Born: 1951; Warsaw, Poland
- Died: May 2011 (aged 59–60); Pawtucket, Rhode Island
- Education: Academy of Fine Arts in Warsaw
- Known for: Abstract painting
- Movement: Process art
- Website: http://www.ksiazek.org

Włodzimierz Książek (1951 in Warsaw, Poland – body found May 18, 2011 in Pawtucket, USA) was a Polish-born contemporary artist based in New England, and since 2001 worked from a 6000 sq. ft. studio in Rhode Island. He was best known for his large-scale abstract paintings.

== Life ==
Ksiazek studied at the Warsaw Academy of Fine Arts, where he received a Master of Fine Arts degree in Painting and Art in Architecture in 1975. He emigrated to the United States in 1982 as a political refugee, escaping martial law in Poland. During next few years he had received numerous grants and fellowships, including Yaddo artist-in-resident 1983 grant, Virginia Center for the Creative Arts at Sweet Briar College (1984), Millay Colony for the Arts(1984), Ragdale Foundation (1984), Dorland Mountain Colony, Altos de Chavon (1985), Montalvo Arts Center (1985), Djerassi Artists Residency (1986), Artists Space (1987), Adolph and Esther Gottlieb Foundation (1991), and artist-in-residence at Loughborough University, England, and Dartmouth College. He became part of a community of visual artists, poets, and writers working on the Eastern seaboard. He had been a permanent resident of the United States since 1988. Wlodzimierz Ksiazek was visiting lecturer/Visiting artists at a numerous colleges and universities, including Marlboro College, Rhode Island School of Design, and the School of the Museum of Fine Arts in Boston,

He died in mysterious circumstances in his studio in Pawtucket, RI, where his body was discovered on May 18, 2011. Wlodzimierz Ksiazek was married to Sarah Williams Goldhagen, with whom he had one daughter, Veronica Goldhagen.

== Work ==
The oil paint seems at times hewn with a palette knife, either roughly or in clean lines, in the case of the latter to formally oppose the chaotic nature of the gradations of color and unexpected buildups of texture. The play of somewhat straight strokes with roughness results in what Ksiazek says could evoke "particular images, for example, archeological sites, floor plans of artifacts such as cathedrals or quotations from architecture." The under-colors, which are tones placed as previous layerings, mix in myriad fashions with successive layers on top.

— ArtsEditor

His works are abstract. Ksiazek used oil paints and encaustic painting on large canvasses to build up layers with thin washes and impastos, then scratches, splatters, gouges and picks at the paint to create incised geometric forms and lines. His works took up to six months to complete, and were usually untitled. He, personally, disliked to call his paintings abstract. If forced to label his work, he would use the term, "Constructionist."

Donald Kuspit, a professor of art history and philosophy noted that "The hard work that Ksiazek puts into his paintings ... in a constant effort to strike a new balance between two dimensions and three dimensions ... is what makes Ksiazek's paintings creative "advances" in the history of painting."

Wlodzimierz Ksiazek exhibited at Marisa Del Re Gallery and John Gibson Gallery in New York. He had numerous solo exhibitions at the Kouros Gallery in New York, and the Alpha Gallery in Boston., as well as throughout the United States, Europe and Asia. His other solo exhibition record includes venues such as the Consulate General of the Republic of Poland in New York,. His work resides in numerous public and private collections in the United States and abroad.
