= Hitler's Willing Executioners =

Book by Daniel Goldhagen

Hitler's Willing Executioners: Ordinary Germans and the Holocaust
- Author: Daniel Goldhagen
- Language: English
- Subject: The Holocaust
- Publisher: Alfred A. Knopf
- Publication date: 1996
- Publication place: United States
- Media type: Print
- Pages: 622
- ISBN: 0-679-44695-8
- OCLC: 33103054
- Dewey Decimal: 940.5318
- LC Class: D804.3 .G648

Hitler's Willing Executioners: Ordinary Germans and the Holocaust is a 1996 book by American writer Daniel Goldhagen, in which he argues for collective guilt: that the vast majority of ordinary Germans were "willing executioners" in the Holocaust because of a unique and virulent "eliminationist antisemitism" in German political culture which had developed in the preceding centuries. Goldhagen argues that eliminationist antisemitism was the cornerstone of German national identity, was unique to Germany, and that as a result ordinary German conscripts killed Jews willingly. Goldhagen asserts that this mentality grew out of medieval attitudes rooted in religion and was later secularized.

The book challenges several common ideas about the Holocaust that Goldhagen believes to be myths. These "myths" include the idea that most Germans did not know about the Holocaust; that only the Schutzstaffel (SS), and not average members of the Wehrmacht, participated in murdering Jews; and that genocidal antisemitism was a uniquely Nazi ideology without historical antecedents.

The book, which began as a Harvard doctoral dissertation, was written largely as an answer to Christopher Browning's 1992 book Ordinary Men: Reserve Police Battalion 101 and the Final Solution in Poland. Much of Goldhagen's book focuses on the actions of the same Reserve Battalion 101 of the Nazi German Ordnungspolizei. His narrative challenges various points of Browning's book. Goldhagen had already indicated his opposition to Browning's thesis in a review of Ordinary Men in the July 13, 1992, edition of The New Republic titled "The Evil of Banality". His doctoral dissertation, The Nazi Executioners: A Study of Their Behavior and the Causation of Genocide, won the American Political Science Association's 1994 Gabriel A. Almond Award for the best dissertation in the field of comparative politics.

Goldhagen's book stoked controversy and debate in Germany and the United States. Some historians have characterized its reception as an extension of the Historikerstreit, the German historiographical debate of the 1980s that sought to explain Nazi history. The book was a "publishing phenomenon", achieving fame in both the United States and Germany, despite its "mostly scathing" reception among historians, who were unusually vocal in condemning it as ahistorical and, in the words of Holocaust historian Raul Hilberg, "totally wrong about everything" and "worthless". Hitler's Willing Executioners won the Democracy Prize of the Journal for German and International Politics. The Harvard Gazette asserted that the selection was the result of Goldhagen's book having "helped sharpen public understanding about the past during a period of radical change in Germany".

== "The Evil of Banality" ==
In 1992, the American historian Christopher Browning published a book titled Ordinary Men: Reserve Police Battalion 101 and the Final Solution in Poland about the Reserve Police Battalion 101, which had been used in 1942 to massacre and round up Jews for deportation to the Nazi death camps in German-occupied Poland. The conclusion of the book, which was much influenced by the Milgram experiment on obedience, was that the men of Unit 101 were not demons or Nazi fanatics but ordinary middle-aged men of working-class background from Hamburg, who had been drafted but found unfit for military duty. In the course of the murderous Operation Reinhard, these men were ordered to round up Jews, and if there was not enough room for them on the trains, to shoot them. In other, more chilling cases, they were ordered simply to kill a specified number of Jews in a given town or area. In one instance, the commander of the unit gave his men the choice of opting out of this duty if they found it too unpleasant; the majority chose not to exercise that option, resulting in fewer than 15 men out of a battalion of 500 opting out. Browning argued that the men of Unit 101 agreed willingly to participate in massacres out of a basic obedience to authority and peer pressure, not bloodlust or primal hatred.

In his 1992 review of Ordinary Men entitled "The Evil of Banality", Goldhagen expressed agreement with several of Browning's findings, namely, that the killings were not, as many people believe, done entirely by SS men, but also by Trawnikis; that the men of Unit 101 had the option not to kill, and – a point Goldhagen emphasizes – that no German was ever punished in any serious way for refusing to kill Jews. But Goldhagen disagreed with Browning's "central interpretation" that the killing was done in the context of the ordinary sociological phenomenon of obedience to authority. Goldhagen instead contended that "for the vast majority of the perpetrators a monocausal explanation does suffice". They were not ordinary men as we usually understand men to be, but "ordinary members of extraordinary political culture, the culture of Nazi Germany, which was possessed of a hallucinatory, lethal view of the Jews. That view was the mainspring of what was, in essence, voluntary barbarism." Goldhagen stated that he would write a book that would rebut Ordinary Men and Browning's thesis and prove instead that it was the murderous antisemitic nature of German culture that led the men of Reserve Battalion 101 to murder Jews.

== Goldhagen's thesis ==
In Hitler's Willing Executioners Goldhagen argued that Germans possessed a unique form of antisemitism, which he called "eliminationist antisemitism," a virulent ideology stretching back through centuries of German history. Under its influence, the vast majority of Germans wanted to eliminate Jews from German society, and the perpetrators of the Holocaust did what they did because they thought it was "right and necessary." For Goldhagen the Holocaust, in which so many Germans participated, must be explained as a result of the specifically German brand of antisemitism.

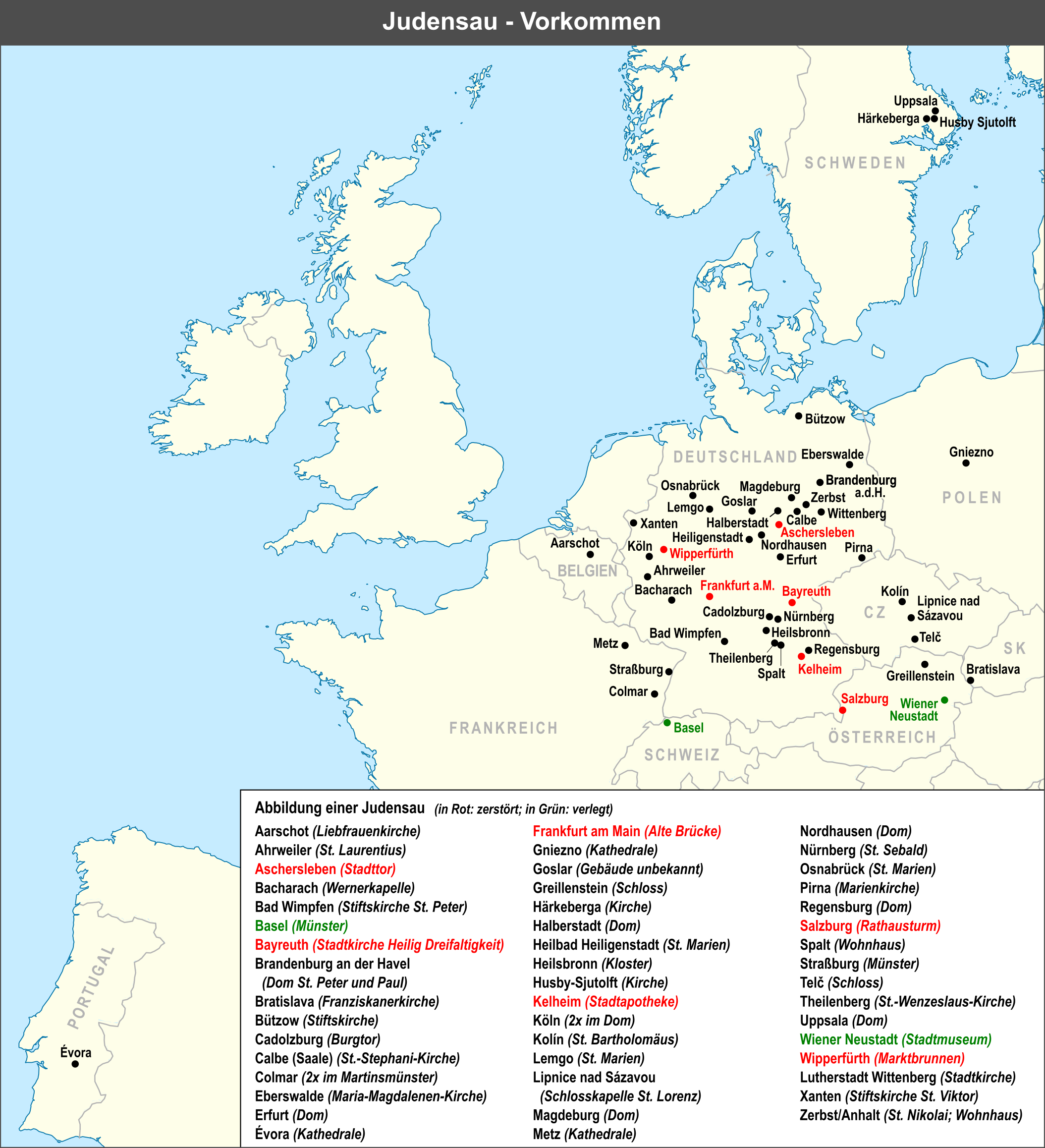
Map listing (in German) the presence of Judensau images on churches of central Europe; the ones that were removed marked in red

Goldhagen charged that every other book written on the Holocaust was flawed by the fact that historians had treated Germans in the Third Reich as "more or less like us," wrongly believing that "their sensibilities had remotely approximated our own." Instead, Goldhagen argued that historians should examine ordinary Germans of the Nazi period, in the same way that they examined the Aztecs who believed in the necessity of human sacrifice to appease the gods, and ensure that the Sun would rise every day. His thesis, he said, was based on the assumption that Germans were not a "normal" Western people influenced by the values of the Enlightenment. His approach would be anthropological, treating Germans the same way that an anthropologist would describe preindustrial people who believed in absurd things such as trees having magical powers.

Goldhagen's book was meant to be an anthropological "thick description" in the manner of Clifford Geertz. The violent antisemitic "cultural axiom" held by Martin Luther in the 16th century and expressed in his 1543 book On the Jews and Their Lies, according to Goldhagen, were the same as those held by Adolf Hitler in the 20th century. He argued that such was the ferocity of German "eliminationist antisemitism" that the situation in Germany had been "pregnant with murder" regarding the Jews since the mid-19th century and that all Hitler did was merely to unleash the deeply rooted murderous "eliminationist antisemitism" that had been brooding within the German people since at least Luther's time, if not earlier.

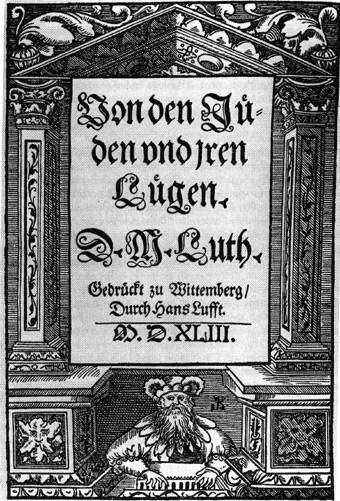
Title page of Martin Luther's On the Jews and Their Lies. Wittenberg, 1543. Goldhagen used Luther's book to argue for the deep-rooted unique "eliminationist" antisemitism of German culture.

Hitler's Willing Executioners marked a revisionist challenge to the prevailing orthodoxy surrounding the question of German public opinion and the Final Solution. The British historian Sir Ian Kershaw, a leading expert in the social history of the Third Reich, wrote, "The road to Auschwitz was built by hate, but paved with indifference," that is, that the progress leading up to Auschwitz was motivated by a vicious form of antisemitism on the part of the Nazi elite, but that it took place in a context where the majority of German public opinion was indifferent to what was happening. In several articles and books, most notably his 1983 book Popular Opinion and Political Dissent in the Third Reich, Kershaw argued that most Germans were at a minimum at least vaguely aware of the Holocaust, but did not much care about what their government was doing to the Jews. Other historians, such as the Israeli historian Otto Dov Kulka, the Israeli historian David Bankier, and the American historian Aron Rodrigue, while differing from Kershaw over many details about German public opinion, arguing that the term "passive complicity" is a better description than "indifference", have largely agreed with Kershaw that there was a chasm of opinion about the Jews between the Nazi "true believers" and the wider German public, whose views towards Jews seemed to have expressed more of a dislike than a hatred. Goldhagen, in contrast, declared the term "indifference" to be unacceptable, contending that the vast majority of Germans were active antisemites who wanted to kill Jews in the most "pitiless" and "callous" manner possible.

As such, to prove his thesis Goldhagen focused on the behavior of ordinary Germans who killed Jews, especially the behavior of the men of Order Police Reserve Battalion 101 in Poland in 1942 to argue ordinary Germans possessed by "eliminationist antisemitism" chose to willingly murder Jews. The 450 or so men of Battalion 101 were mostly middle-aged, working-class men from Hamburg who showed little interest in National Socialism and who had no special training to prepare them for genocide. Despite their very different interpretations of Battalion 101, both Browning and Goldhagen have argued that the men of the unit were a cross-sample of ordinary Germans.

Using Geertz's anthropological methods, Goldhagen argued by studying the men of Battalion 101 one could engage in a "thick description" of the German "eliminationist antisemitic" culture. Contra Browning, Goldhagen argued that the men of Battalion 101 were not reluctant killers, but instead willingly murdered Polish Jews in the cruelest and sadistic manner possible, that "brutality and cruelty" were central to the ethos of Battalion 101. In its turn, the "culture of cruelty" in Battalion 101 was linked by Goldhagen to the culture of "eliminationist antisemitism". Goldhagen noted that the officers in charge of Battalion 101 led by Major Wilhem Trapp allowed the men to excuse themselves from killing if they found it too unpleasant, and Goldhagen used the fact that the vast majority of the men of Battalion 101 did not excuse themselves to argue that this proved the murderous antisemitic nature of German culture. Goldhagen argued for the specific antisemitic nature of Battalion 101's violence by noting that in 1942 the battalion was ordered to shoot 200 Gentile Poles, and instead shot 78 Polish Catholics while shooting 180 Polish Jews later that same day. Goldhagen used this incident to argue the men of Battalion 101 were reluctant to kill Polish Catholics, but only too willing to murder Polish Jews. Goldhagen wrote the men of Battalion 101 felt "joy and triumph" after torturing and murdering Jews. Goldhagen used antisemitic statements by Cardinal Adolf Bertram as typical of what he called the Roman Catholic Church's support for genocide. Goldhagen was later to expand on what he sees as the Catholic Church's institutional antisemitism and support for the Nazi regime in Hitler's Willing Executioners's sequel, 2002's A Moral Reckoning. Goldhagen argued that it "strains credibility" to imagine that "ordinary Danes or Italians" could have acted as he claimed ordinary Germans did during the Holocaust to prove that "eliminationist" antisemitism was uniquely German.

== Reception ==
What some commentators termed "The Goldhagen Affair" began in late 1996, when Goldhagen visited Berlin to participate in the debate on television and in lecture halls before capacity crowds, on a book tour. Although Hitler's Willing Executioners was sharply criticized in Germany at its debut, the intense public interest in the book secured the author much celebrity among Germans, so much so that Harold Marcuse characterizes him as "the darling of the German public". Many media commentators observed that, while the book launched a passionate national discussion about the Holocaust, this discussion was carried out civilly and respectfully. Goldhagen's book tour became, in the opinion of some in the German media, "a triumphant march", as "the open-mindedness that Goldhagen encountered in the land of the perpetrators" was "gratifying" and something of which Germans ought to be proud, even in the context of a book which sought, according to some critics, to "erase the distinction between Germans and Nazis".

Goldhagen was awarded the Democracy Prize in 1997 by the German Journal for German and International Politics, which asserted that "because of the penetrating quality and the moral power of his presentation, Daniel Goldhagen has greatly stirred the consciousness of the German public." The laudatio, awarded for the first time since 1990, was given by Jürgen Habermas and Jan Philipp Reemtsma. Elie Wiesel praised the work as something every German schoolchild should read.

Debate about Goldhagen's theory has been intense. Detractors have contended that the book is "profoundly flawed" or "bad history". Some historians have criticized or simply dismissed the text, citing among other deficiencies Goldhagen's "neglect of decades of research in favour of his own preconceptions", which he proceeds to articulate in an "intemperate, emotional, and accusatory tone". In 1997, the German historian Hans Mommsen gave an interview in which he said that Goldhagen had a poor understanding of the diversities of German antisemitism, that he construed "a unilinear continuity of German anti-semitism from the medieval period onwards" with Hitler as its end result, whereas, said Mommsen, it is obvious that Hitler's antisemitic propaganda had no significant impact on the election campaigns between September 1930 and November 1932 and on his coming to power, a crucial phenomenon ignored by Goldhagen. Goldhagen's one-dimensional view of German antisemitism also ignores the specific impact of the völkisch antisemitism as proclaimed by Houston Stuart Chamberlain and the Richard Wagner movement which directly influenced Hitler as well as the Nazi party. Finally, Mommsen criticizes Goldhagen for errors in his understanding of the internal structure of the Third Reich. In the interview, Mommsen distinguished three varieties of German antisemitism. "Cultural antisemitism," directed primarily against the Eastern Jews, was part of the "cultural code" of German conservatives, who were mainly found in the German officer corps and the high civil administration. It stifled protests by conservatives against persecutions of the Jews, as well as Hitler's proclamation of a "racial annihilation war" against the Soviet Union. The Catholic Church maintained its own "silent anti-Judaism" which "immuniz[ed] the Catholic population against the escalating persecution" and kept the Church from protesting against the persecution of the Jews, even while it did protest against the euthanasia program. Third was the so-called völkisch antisemitism or racism, the most vitriolic form, the foremost advocate of using violence.

Christopher Browning wrote in response to Goldhagen's criticism of him in the 1998 "Afterword" to Ordinary Men published by HarperCollins:

Goldhagen must prove not only that Germans treated Jewish and non-Jewish victims differently (on which virtually all historians agree), but also that the different treatment is to be explained fundamentally by the antisemitic motivation of the vast majority of the perpetrators and not by other possible motivations, such as compliance with different government policies for different victim groups. The second and third case studies of Hitler's Willing Executioners are aimed at meeting the burden of proof on these two points. Goldhagen argues that the case of the Lipowa and Flughafen Jewish labor camps in Lublin demonstrates that in contrast to other victims, only Jewish labor was treated murderously by the Germans without regard for and indeed counter to economic rationality. And the Helmbrechts death march case, he argues, demonstrates that Jews were killed even when orders have been given to keep them alive, and hence the driving motive for the killing was not compliance to government policy or obedience to orders, but the deep personal hatred of the perpetrators for their Jewish victims that had been inculcated by German culture.

About Goldhagen's claims that the men of Order Police Reserve Battalion 101 were reluctant to kill Polish Catholics while being eager to kill Polish Jews, Browning accused Goldhagen of having double standards with the historical evidence. Browning wrote:

Goldhagen cites numerous instances of gratuitous and voluntaristic killing of Jews as relevant to assessing the attitudes of the killers. But he omits a similar case of gratuitous, voluntaristic killing by Reserve Police Battalion 101 when the victims were Poles. A German police official was reported killed in the village of Niezdów, whereupon policemen about to visit the cinema in Opole were sent to carry out a reprisal action. Only elderly Poles, mostly women, remained in the village, as the younger Poles had all fled. Word came, moreover, that the ambushed German policeman had been only wounded, not killed. Nonetheless, the men of Reserve Police Battalion 101 shot all the elderly Poles and set the village on fire before returning to the cinema for an evening of casual and relaxing entertainment. There is not much evidence of "obvious distaste and reluctance" to kill Poles to be seen in this episode. Would Goldhagen have omitted this incident if the victims had been Jews and an anti-Semitic motivation could have easily been inferred?

About the long-term origins of the Holocaust, Browning argued that by the end of the 19th century, antisemitism was widely accepted by most German conservatives and that virtually all German conservatives supported the Nazi regime's antisemitic laws of 1933–34 (and the few who did object like President Hindenburg only objected to the inclusion of Jewish war veterans in the antisemitic laws that they otherwise supported) but that left to their own devices, would not have gone further and that for all their fierce antisemitism, German conservatives would not have engaged in genocide. Browning also contended that the antisemitism of German conservative elites in the military and the bureaucracy long prior to 1933 meant that they made few objections, moral or otherwise to the Nazi/völkisch antisemitism. Browning was echoing the conclusions of the German conservative historian Andreas Hillgruber who once presented at a historians' conference in 1984 a counter-factual scenario whereby, had it been a coalition of the German National People's Party and Der Stahlhelm that took power in 1933 without the NSDAP, all the antisemitic laws in Germany that were passed between 1933 and 1938 would still have occurred but there would have been no Holocaust.

The Israeli historian Yehuda Bauer wrote that Goldhagen's thesis about a murderous antisemitic culture applied better to Romania than to Germany and murderous antisemitism was not confined to Germany as Goldhagen had claimed. Bauer wrote of the main parties of the Weimar Coalition that dominated German politics until 1930, the leftist SPD and the liberal DDP were opposed to antisemitism while the right-of-the-centre Catholic Zentrum was "moderately" antisemitic. Bauer wrote of the major pre-1930 political parties, the only party that could be described as radically antisemitic was the conservative German National People's Party, who Bauer called "the party of the traditional, often radical anti-Semitic elites" who were "a definite minority" while the NSDAP won only 2.6% of the vote in the Reichstag elections in May 1928. Bauer charged that it was the Great Depression, not an alleged culture of murderous antisemitism that allowed the NSDAP to make its electoral breakthrough in the Reichstag elections of September 1930.

Formally, at least, the Jews had been fully emancipated with the establishment of the German Empire, although they were kept out of certain influential occupations, enjoyed extraordinary prosperity ... Germans intermarried with Jews: in the 1930s some 50,000 Jews were living in mixed German-Jewish marriages, so at least 50,000 Germans, and presumably parts of their families, had familial contact with the Jews. Goldhagen himself mentions that a large proportion of the Jewish upper classes in Germany converted to Christianity in the nineteenth century. In a society where eliminationist norms were universal and in which Jews were rejected even after they had converted, or so he argues, the rise of this extreme form of assimilation of Jews would hardly have been possible.

Despite having a generally critical view of Goldhagen, Bauer wrote that the final chapters of Hitler's Willing Executioners dealing with the death marches were "the best part of the book. Little is new in the overall description, but the details and the way he analyzes the attitude of the murderers is powerful and convincing". Finally Bauer charged "that the anti-German bias of his book, almost a racist bias (however much he may deny it) leads nowhere".

Concerning Order Police Reserve Battalion 101, the Australian historian Inga Clendinnen wrote that Goldhagen's picture of Major Trapp, the unit's commander as an antisemitic fanatic was "far-fetched" and "there is no indication, on that first day or later that he found the murdering of Jewish civilians a congenial task". Clendinnen wrote that Goldhagen's attempt to "blame the Nazis' extreme and gratuitous savagery" on the Germans was "unpersuasive", and the pogroms that killed thousands of Jews committed by Lithuanian mobs in the summer of 1941, shortly after the arrival of German troops, suggested murderous antisemitism was not unique to Germany. Clendinnen ended her essay by stating she found Browning's account of Battalion 101 to be the more believable.

The Israeli historian Omer Bartov wrote that to accept Goldhagen's thesis would also have to mean accepting that the entire German Jewish community was "downright stupid" from the mid-19th century onwards because it is otherwise impossible to explain why they chose to remain in Germany, if the people were so murderously hostile or why so many German Jews wanted to assimilate into an "eliminationist anti-Semitic" culture. In a 1996 review in First Things, the American Catholic priest Father Richard John Neuhaus took issue with Goldhagen's claim that the Catholic and Lutheran churches in Germany were genocidal towards the Jews, arguing that there was a difference between Christian and Nazi antisemitism. Neuhaus argued that Goldhagen was wrong to claim that Luther had created a legacy of intense, genocidal antisemitism within Lutheranism, asking why, if that were the case, would so many people in solidly Lutheran Denmark act to protect the Danish Jewish minority from deportation to the death camps in 1943. The Canadian historian Peter Hoffmann accused Goldhagen of maligning Carl Friedrich Goerdeler, arguing that Goldhagen had taken wildly out of context the list of Jewish doctors forbidden to practice that Goerdeler as Lord Mayor of Leipzig had issued in April 1935. Hoffmann contended that what happened was that on April 9, 1935, the Deputy Mayor of Leipzig, the National Socialist Rudolf Haake, banned all Jewish doctors from participating in public health insurance and advised all municipal employees not to consult Jewish doctors, going beyond the existing antisemitic laws then in place. In response, the Landesverband Mitteldeutschland des Centralvereins deutscher Staatsbürger jüdischen Glaubens e. V (Middle German Regional Association of the Central Association of German Citizens of Jewish Faith) complained to Goerdeler about Haake's actions and asked him to enforce the existing antisemitic laws, which at least allowed some Jewish doctors to practice. On 11 April 1935, Goerdeler ordered the end of Haake's boycott, and provided a list of "non-Aryan" physicians permitted to operate under the existing laws and those who were excluded.

Others have contended that, despite the book's "undeniable flaws", it "served to refocus the debate on the question of German national responsibility and guilt", in the context of a re-emergence of a German political right, which may have sought to "relativize" or "normalize" Nazi history.

Goldhagen's assertion that almost all Germans "wanted to be genocidal executioners" has been viewed with skepticism by most historians, a skepticism ranging from dismissal as "not valid social science" to a condemnation, in the words of the Israeli historian Yehuda Bauer, as "patent nonsense". Common complaints suggest that Goldhagen's primary hypothesis is either "oversimplified", or represents "a bizarre inversion of the Nazi view of the Jews" turned back upon the Germans. One German commentator suggested that Goldhagen's book "pushes us again and again headfirst into the nasty anti-Semitic mud. This is his revenge." Eberhard Jäckel wrote a very hostile book review in the Die Zeit newspaper in May 1996 that called Hitler's Willing Executioners "simply a bad book". The British historian Sir Ian Kershaw wrote that he fully agreed with Jäckel on the merits of Hitler's Willing Executioners". Kershaw wrote in 2000 that Goldhagen's book would "occupy only a limited place in the unfolding, vast historiography of such a crucially important topic-probably at best as a challenge to historians to qualify or counter his 'broad-brush' generalisations".

In 1996, the American historian David Schoenbaum wrote a highly critical book review in the National Review of Hitler's Willing Executioners where he charged Goldhagen with grossly simplifying the question of the degree and virulence of German Antisemitism, and of only selecting evidence that supported his thesis. Furthermore, Schoenbaum complained that Goldhagen did not take a comparative approach with Germany placed in isolation, thereby falsely implying that Germans and Germans alone were the only nation that saw widespread antisemitism. Finally, Schoenbaum argued that Goldhagen failed to explain why the anti-Jewish boycott of April 1, 1933, was relatively ineffective or why the Kristallnacht needed to be organized by the Nazis as opposed to being a spontaneous expression of German popular antisemitism. Using an example from his family history, Schoenbaum wrote that his mother in law, a Polish Jew who lived in Germany between 1928–47, never considered the National Socialists and the Germans synonymous, and expressed regret that Goldhagen could not see the same.

Hitler's Willing Executioners also drew controversy with the publication of two critical articles: "Daniel Jonah Goldhagen's 'Crazy' Thesis", by the American political science professor Norman Finkelstein and initially published in the UK political journal New Left Review, and "Historiographical review: Revising the Holocaust", written by the Canadian historian Ruth Bettina Birn and initially published in the Historical Journal of Cambridge. These articles were later published as the book A Nation on Trial: The Goldhagen Thesis and Historical Truth. In response to their book, Goldhagen sought a retraction and apology from Birn, threatening at one point to sue her for libel and according to Salon declaring Finkelstein "a supporter of Hamas". The force of the counterattacks against Birn and Finkelstein from Goldhagen's supporters was described by Israeli journalist Tom Segev as "bordering on cultural terrorism ... The Jewish establishment has embraced Goldhagen as if he were Mr Holocaust himself ... All this is absurd, because the criticism of Goldhagen is backed up so well."

The Austrian-born American historian Raul Hilberg has stated that Goldhagen is "totally wrong about everything. Totally wrong. Exceptionally wrong." Hilberg also wrote in an open letter on the eve of the book launch at the U.S. Holocaust Memorial Museum that "The book is advertised as something that will change our thinking. It can do nothing of the sort. To me it is worthless, all the hype by the publisher notwithstanding". Yehuda Bauer was similarly condemnatory, questioning how an institute such as Harvard could award a doctorate for a work which so "slipped through the filter of critical scholarly assessment". Bauer also suggested that Goldhagen lacked familiarity with sources not in English or German, which thereby excluded research from Polish and Israeli sources writing in Hebrew, among others, all of whom had produced important research in the subject that would require a more subtle analysis. Bauer also argued that these linguistic limitations substantially impaired Goldhagen from undertaking broader comparative research into European antisemitism, which would have demanded further refinements to his analysis.

Goldhagen replied to his critics in an article Motives, Causes, and Alibis: A Reply to My Critics:

What is striking among some of those who have criticized my book—against whom so many people in Germany are openly reacting—is that much of what they have written and said has either a tenuous relationship to the book's contents or is patently false. Some of the outright falsehoods include: that little is new in the book; that it puts forward a monocausal and deterministic explanation of the Holocaust, holding it to have been the inevitable outcome of German history; that its argument is ahistorical; and that it makes an "essentialist," "racist" or ethnic argument about Germans. None of these is true.

Ruth Bettina Birn and Volker Riess recognised the need to examine the primary sources (the Police Battalion investigation records) Goldhagen had cited and determine if Goldhagen had applied the historical method in his research. Their task was complicated by the way that "Goldhagen's book [had] neither a bibliography nor a listing of archival sources". Their conclusions were that Goldhagen's analysis of the records:

seems to follow no stringent methodological approach whatsoever. This is the problem. He prefers instead to use parts of the statements selectively, to re-interpret them according to his own point of view, or to take them out of context and make them fit into his own interpretative framework. [...] Using Goldhagen's method of handling evidence, one could easily find enough citations from the Ludwigsburg material to prove the exact opposite of what Goldhagen maintains. [...] Goldhagen's book is not driven by sources, be they primary or secondary ones. He does not allow the witness statements he uses to speak for themselves. He uses material as an underpinning for his pre-conceived theory.

Historian Richard J. Evans was highly critical, saying of Goldhagen's work:

...a book which argued in a crude and dogmatic fashion that virtually all Germans had been murderous antisemites since the middle ages, had been longing to exterminate the Jews for decades before Hitler came to power, and actively enjoyed participating in the extermination when it began. The book has since been exposed as a tissue of misrepresentation and misinterpretation, written in shocking ignorance of the huge historical literature on the topic and making numerous elementary mistakes in its interpretation of the documents.

=== Accusations of racism ===
Several critics, including David North, have characterized Goldhagen's text as adopting Nazi concepts of identity and utilizing them to slur Germans. Hilberg, to whom Browning dedicated his monograph, wrote that "Goldhagen has left us with the image of a medieval-like incubus, a demon latent in the German mind ... waiting for the opportunity for the chance to strike out". The American columnist D.D. Guttenplan, author of The Holocaust on Trial (about the David Irving libel case), also dedicated to Hilberg, wrote that the only difference between Goldhagen's claims of an eliminationist culture and those of Meir Kahane was that Goldhagen's targets were the Germans, whereas Kahane's targets were the Arabs. Guttenplan charged that Goldhagen's remarks about the deaths of three million Soviet POWs in German custody in World War II as "incidental" to the Holocaust were factually wrong, stating that the first people gassed at Auschwitz in August 1941 were Soviet POWs. Influenced by the thesis about the Jews and Soviets as equal victims of the Holocaust presented in the American historian Arno J. Mayer's 1988 book Why Did the Heavens Not Darken? Guttenplan argued that the Nazi theories about "Judo-Bolshevism" made for a more complex explanation for the Holocaust than the Goldhagen thesis about an "eliminationist anti-Semitic" culture.

Goldhagen has said that there is no racist or ethnic argument about Germans in his text. Some of his critics have agreed with him that his thesis is "not intrinsically racist or otherwise illegitimate", including Ruth Bettina Birn and Norman Finkelstein (A Nation on Trial).

=== Popular response ===
When the English edition of Hitler's Willing Executioners was published in March 1996, numerous German reviews ensued. In April 1996, before the book had appeared in German translation, Der Spiegel ran a cover story on Hitler's Willing Executioners under the title "Ein Volk von Dämonen?". The phrase ein Volk von Dämonen (translated "a people/nation of demons") was often used by the Nazis to describe Jews, and the title of the cover story was meant by Rudolf Augstein and the editors of Der Spiegel to suggest a moral equivalence between the Nazi view of Jews and Goldhagen's view of Germans. The most widely read German weekly newspaper Die Zeit published an eight-part series of opinions of the book before its German publication in August 1996. Goldhagen arrived in Germany in September 1996 for a book tour, and appeared on several television talk shows, as well as a number of sold-out panel discussions.

The book had a "mostly scathing" reception among historians, who were vocal in condemning it as ahistorical. "Why does this book, so lacking in factual content and logical rigour, demand so much attention?" Raul Hilberg wondered. The pre-eminent Jewish-American historian Fritz Stern denounced the book as unscholarly and full of racist Germanophobia. Hilberg summarised the debates: "by the end of 1996, it was clear that in sharp distinction from lay readers, much of the academic world had wiped Goldhagen off the map."

Steve Crawshaw writes that although the German readership was keenly aware of certain "professional failings" in Goldhagen's book,

[T]hese perceived professional failings proved almost irrelevant. Instead, Goldhagen became a bellwether of German readiness to confront the past. The accuracy of his work was, in this context, of secondary importance. Millions of Germans who wished to acknowledge the (undeniable and well-documented) fact that ordinary Germans participated in the Holocaust welcomed his work; his suggestion that Germans were predestined killers was accepted as part of the uncomfortable package. Goldhagen's book was treated as a way of ensuring that Germany came to terms with its past.

Crawshaw further asserts that the book's critics were partly historians "weary" of Goldhagen's "methodological flaws", but also those who were reluctant to concede that ordinary Germans bore responsibility for the crimes of Nazi Germany. In Germany, the leftist general public's insistence on further penitence prevailed, according to most observers. American historian Gordon A. Craig and Der Spiegel have argued that whatever the book's flaws, it should be welcomed because it will reinvigorate the debate on the Holocaust and stimulate new scholarship.

=== Journalism ===
In May 1996, Goldhagen was interviewed about Hitler's Willing Executioners by the American journalist Ron Rosenbaum. When Rosenbaum asked Goldhagen about scholarly literature that contends that Austrian antisemitism was far more virulent and violent than German antisemitism, and if the fact that Hitler was an Austrian had any effect on his thesis, Goldhagen replied:

There were regional variations in anti-Semitism even within Germany. But Hitler's exemplified and brought to an apotheosis the particular form of eliminationist anti-Semitism that came to the fore in the latter part of the nineteenth century. Whatever the variations, I think Austrian and German anti-Semitism can be seen of a piece, where there was a central model of Jews and a view that they needed to be eliminated.

Rosenbaum inquired about Goldhagen's "pregnant with murder" metaphor, which suggested that the Shoah was something inevitable that would have happened without Hitler and Milton Himmelfarb's famous formulation "No Hitler, no Holocaust". Rosenbaum asked "So you would agree with Himmelfarb's argument?" Goldhagen replied: "If the Nazis had never taken power, there would not have been a Hitler. Had there not been a depression in Germany, then in all likelihood the Nazis wouldn't have come to power. The anti-Semitism would have remained a potential, in the sense of the killing form. It required a state." Rosenbaum asked Goldhagen about Richard Levy's 1975 book The Downfall of the Anti-Semitic Political Parties in Imperial Germany which traced the decline of the völkisch parties in the early 20th century until they were all but wiped out in the 1912 Reichstag election. Goldhagen replied that voting for or against the wildly antisemitic völkisch parties had nothing to do with antisemitic feeling, and that people could still hate Jews without voting for the völkisch parties.

In 2006, Jewish American conservative columnist Jonah Goldberg argued that "Goldhagen's thesis was overstated but fundamentally accurate. There was something unique to Germany that made its fascism genocidal. Around the globe, there have been dozens of self-declared fascist movements (and a good deal more that go by different labels), and few of them have embraced Nazi-style genocide. Indeed, fascist Spain was a haven for Jews during the Holocaust." Goldberg went on to state that Goldhagen was mistaken in believing that "eliminationist antisemitism" was unique to Germany, and Goldberg charged "eliminationist antisemitism" was just as much a feature of modern Palestinian culture as it was of 19th-20th-century German culture, and that in all essentials Hamas today was just as genocidal as the NSDAP had been. In 2011, in an apparent reference to Hitler's Willing Executioners, the American columnist Jeffrey Goldberg wrote the leaders of the Islamic Republic of Iran were all "eliminationist anti-Semites". From a different angle, the American political scientist Norman Finkelstein charged that the book was Zionist propaganda meant to promote the image of a Gentile world forever committed to the destruction of the Jews, thus justifying the existence of Israel, and as such, Goldhagen's book was more concerned with the politics of the Near East and excusing what Finkelstein claimed was Israel's poor human rights record rather than European history. In turn during a review of A Nation On Trial, the American journalist Max Frankel wrote that Finkelstein's anti-Zionist politics had led him to "get so far afield from the Goldhagen thesis that it is a relief to reach the critique by Ruth Bettina Birn".

== See also ==
- Collective guilt
- Sonderweg
