= Beyond Tolerance =

Book

- Author: Philip Jenkins
- Language: English
- Publisher: New York University Press
- Publication date: 2001
- Pages: 260

Beyond Tolerance: Child Pornography on the Internet is a book about moral panics by Pennsylvania State University historian Philip Jenkins. It was published by the New York University Press in 2001.
