= Yad Vashem International Book Prize for Holocaust Research =

Annual award in recognition of high scholarly research and writing on the Holocaust

The Yad Vashem International Book Prize for Holocaust Research is an annual award by Yad Vashem, the State of Israel's Holocaust authority, in recognition of high scholarly research and writing on the Holocaust or its antecedents and aftermath published two years preceding the year of the award. It was established in 2011 in memory of Abraham Meir Schwartzbaum, Holocaust survivor, and his family who was murdered in the Holocaust.

== 2018 ==
Awarded to Ion Popa for his book The Romanian Orthodox Church and the Holocaust (2017) and to Daniel Reiser for Rabbi Kalonymus Kalmish Shapira: Sermons from the Years of Rage.

== 2014 ==
Hunt for the Jews, by Jan Grabowski, won the 2014 award. The book chronicles the role of local Polish citizens in locating and killing hiding Jews. According to the prize committee: it "found Jan Grabowski’s study groundbreaking and exemplary in its approach and methodology, in its analytical quality and in its contribution to the better understanding of the multi-facetedness of the Shoah".

== 2013 ==
The 2013 call for prize is to consider the works published between January 2011 and December 2013.

== 2012 ==
On December 10, 2012, the award was presented to Christoph Dieckmann, of Keele University (UK), for his 2-volume book Deutsche Besatzungspolitik in Litauen 1941-1944 (German Occupation Policy in Lithuania 1941-1944).

== 2011 ==
The first award ceremony was at Yad Vashem on January 8, 2012.

- Christopher R. Browning, for his book Remembering Survival: Inside a Nazi Slave-Labor Camp, 2010
- Daniel Blatman, for his book, The Death Marches: The Final Phase of Nazi Genocide, 2010, ISBN 0674050495.
