= Christopher R. Browning =

American historian of the Holocaust (born 1944)

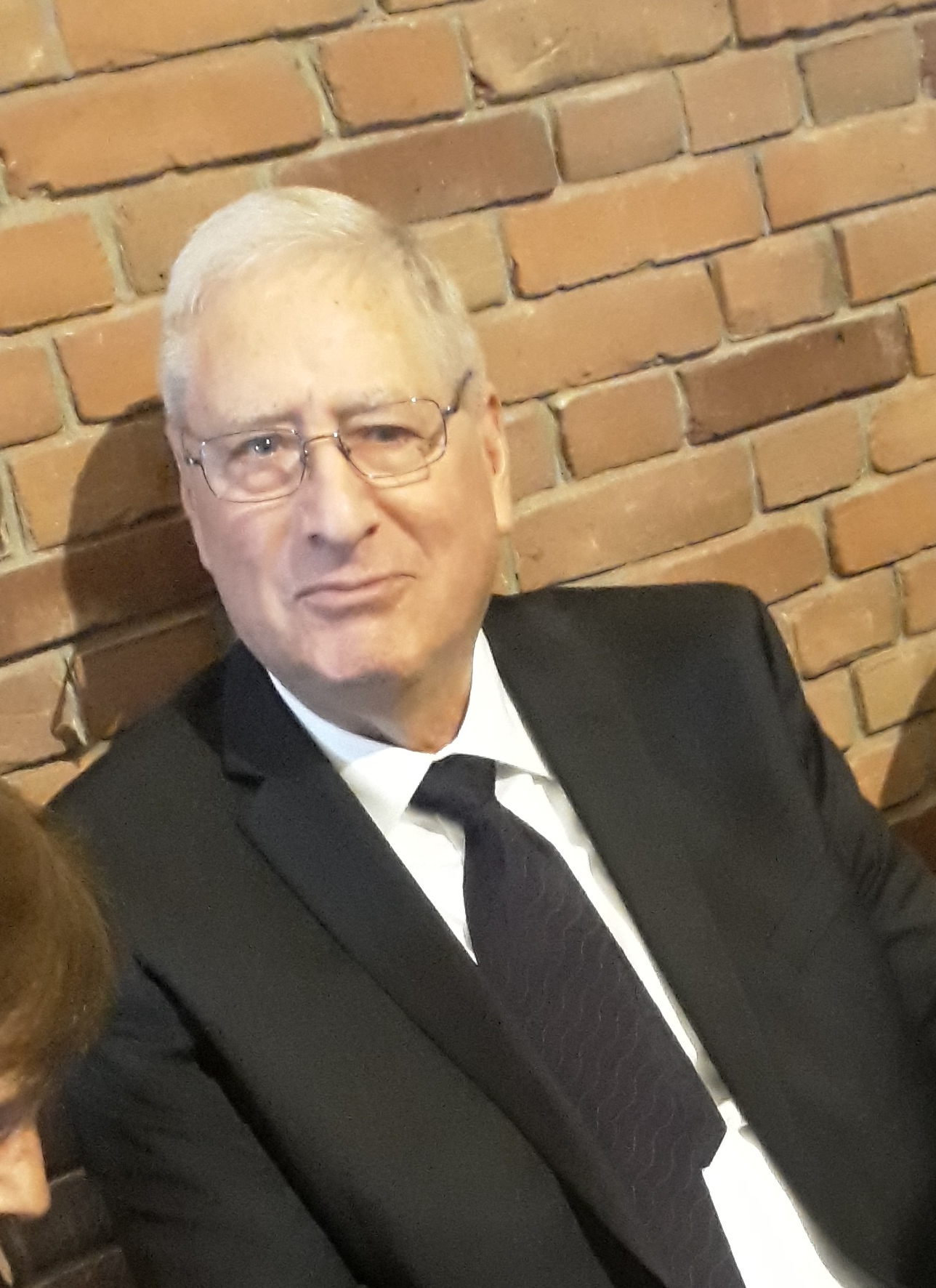
- Browning in 2019
- Born: Christopher Robert Browning; May 22, 1944 (age 82); Durham, North Carolina, U.S.
- Occupation: Historian

Academic background
- Education: Oberlin College (BA); University of Wisconsin-Madison (MA, PhD)
- Thesis: "Referat D III of Abteilung Deutschland and the Jewish Policy of the German Foreign Office 1940–1943" (1975)

Academic work
- Era: The Holocaust
- Notable works: Ordinary Men: Reserve Police Battalion 101 and the Final Solution in Poland (1992)
- Website: Christopher R. Browning, University of North Carolina at Chapel Hill.

Christopher Robert Browning (born May 22, 1944) is an American historian and professor emeritus of history at the University of North Carolina at Chapel Hill (UNC). A specialist on the Holocaust, Browning is known for his work documenting the Final Solution, the behavior of those implementing Nazi policies, and the use of survivor testimony. He is the author of nine books, including Ordinary Men (1992) and The Origins of the Final Solution (2004).

Browning taught at Pacific Lutheran University from 1974 to 1999 and eventually became a distinguished professor. In 1999, he moved to UNC to accept the appointment as Frank Porter Graham Professor of History, and in 2006 he was elected a Fellow of the American Academy of Arts and Sciences. After retiring from UNC in 2014, he became a visiting professor at the University of Washington in Seattle.

Browning has acted as an expert witness at several Holocaust-related trials, including the second trial of Ernst Zündel (1988) and Irving v Penguin Books Ltd (2000).

== Early life and education ==
Born in Durham, North Carolina, Browning was raised in Chicago, where his father was professor of philosophy at Northwestern University and his mother was a nurse. He received his BA in history from Oberlin College in 1967 and his MA, also in history, from the University of Wisconsin–Madison (UW) in 1968. He then taught for a year at St. John's Military Academy and for two years at Allegheny College. He was awarded his PhD from UW in 1975 for the thesis "Referat D III of Abteilung Deutschland and the Jewish Policy of the German Foreign Office 1940–1943." That became his first book, The Final Solution and the German Foreign Office: A study of Referat D III of Abteilung Deutschland, 1940–43 (1978).

Browning married Jennifer Jane Horn on September 19, 1970 and had two children: Kathryn Elizabeth and Anne DeSilvey.

== Work ==
=== Ordinary Men ===
Browning is best known for his 1992 book Ordinary Men: Reserve Police Battalion 101 and the Final Solution in Poland, a study of German Ordnungspolizei (Order Police) Reserve Unit 101. The battalion committed massacres and round-ups of Jews for deportations to Nazi death camps in German-occupied Poland in 1942. The conclusion of the book, influenced in part by the famous Milgram experiments popularized in the 1970s, was that the men of Unit 101 killed out of obedience to authority and peer pressure.

As presented in the study, the men of Reserve Police Battalion 101 were not ardent Nazis but ordinary middle-aged men of working class background from Hamburg, who had been drafted but found to be ineligible for regular military duty. After their return to occupied Poland in June 1942, the men were ordered to terrorize Jews in the ghettos during Operation Reinhard and carry out massacres of Polish Jews (men, women, and children) in the towns of Józefów and Łomazy. In other cases, they were ordered to kill a certain number of Jews in a town or area, usually helped by Trawnikis. The commander of the unit once gave his men the choice of opting out if they found it too hard, but fewer than 12 men did so in a battalion of 500. Browning provides evidence to support the notion that not all of the men were hateful antisemites. He includes the testimony of men who said that they begged to be released from the task and to be placed elsewhere. In one instance, two fathers claimed that they could not kill children and so asked to be given other work. Browning also tells of a man who demanded his release, obtained it, and was promoted once he had returned to Germany.

Ordinary Men achieved much acclaim but was criticized by Daniel Goldhagen for missing what he called a specifically German political culture, characterized by "eliminationist anti-semitism" in causing the Nazi genocides. In a review in The New Republic in July 1992, Goldhagen called Ordinary Men a book that fails in its central interpretation. Goldhagen's controversial 1996 book Hitler's Willing Executioners was largely written to rebut Browning but ended up being criticized much more.

In 2017, Browning published a Revised Edition with a new afterword titled "Twenty-Five Years Later", where he analyzed photographs of Unit 101's activities and discussed research by other scholars on other Order Police battalions, the Luxembourger members of Unit 101, and the motivations of the battalion's members.

In addition to Ordinary Men, Browning has made extensive contributions to Holocaust historiography through works such as Nazi Policy, Jewish Workers, German Killers and numerous articles and chapters examining Nazi Jewish policy, forced labor, and ghetto administration, which have been widely cited in academic research and translated into multiple languages.

=== Irving v. Lipstadt ===
When David Irving sued Deborah Lipstadt for libel in 1996, Browning was one of the leading witnesses for the defense. Another historian, Robert Jan van Pelt, wrote a report on the gas chambers at the Auschwitz concentration camp, and Browning wrote a report on the evidence for the extermination of Jews. During his testimony and a cross-examination by Irving, Browning countered Irving's suggestion that the last chapter of the Holocaust had yet to be written (implying there were grounds for doubting its reality) by saying, "We are still discovering things about the Roman Empire. There is no last chapter in history."

Browning countered Irving's argument that the absence of a written Führer order from Adolf Hitler to carry out the genocide of the European Jews constituted evidence against the standard Holocaust history. Browning maintained that such an order need never have been written since Hitler had almost certainly made statements to his leading subordinates indicating his wishes regarding the Jews, which rendered irrelevant the question of an extant written order. Browning testified that several experts on Nazi Germany believe there was no written Führer order for the "Final Solution of the Jewish Question" but that no historian doubts the reality of the Nazi genocide. Browning noted that Hitler's secret speech to his Gauleiters on December 12, 1941 alluded to genocide as the "Final Solution."

Browning rejected Irving's claim that there was no reliable statistical information on the size of the prewar Jewish population in Europe or on the killing processes. Browning asserted that the only reason that historians debate whether five or six million Jews were killed in the Holocaust was a lack of access to archives in the former Soviet Union.

=== Browning's interpretation of the Holocaust ===
Browning is a "moderate functionalist" in the debate about the origins of the Holocaust and focuses on the structure and institution of the Third Reich, rather than Hitler's intentions and orders. Functionalism sees the extermination of Jews as the improvisation and radicalization of a polycratic regime. Browning has argued that the Final Solution was the result of the "cumulative radicalization" (to use Hans Mommsen's phrase) of the German state, especially when it was faced with the self-imposed "problem" of three million (mostly Polish) Jews, whom the Nazis had imprisoned in ghettos between 1939 and 1941. The intention was to have those and other Jews resident in the Third Reich expelled eastward once a destination was selected. Browning argued that the phrase "Final Solution to the Jewish Question," which was first used in 1939, meant until 1941 a "territorial solution." The military developments of the Second World War and the turf wars within the German bureaucracy made expulsion lose its viability such that by 1941, members of the bureaucracy were willing to countenance the mass murder of Jews.

Browning divides the officials of the General Government of occupied Poland into two factions. The "productionists" favored using Jews of the ghettos as a source of slave labor to help with the war effort. The "attritionists" favored letting them starve and die of disease. At the same time, there were struggles between the Schutzstaffel (SS) and Hans Frank, the Governor-General of occupied Poland. The SS favored "The Nisko/Lublin Plan" to create a "Jewish reservation" in Lublin, in occupied Poland, into which all the Jews of Greater Germany, Poland and the former Czechoslovakia would be expelled. Frank was opposed to the "Lublin Plan" on the ground that the SS were "dumping" Jews into his territory. Frank and Hermann Göring wished for the General Government to become the "granary" of the Reich and opposed the ethnic cleansing schemes of Heinrich Himmler and Arthur Greiser as economically disruptive.

An attempt to settle the difficulties at a conference between Himmler, Göring, Frank and Greiser at Göring's Karinhall estate on February 12, 1940 was scuttled in May, when Himmler showed Hitler a memo, "Some Thoughts on the Treatment of Alien Population in the East," on May 15, 1940, which Hitler called "good and correct." Himmler's memo, which called for expelling all of the Jews of German-ruled Europe to Africa, reducing Poles to a "leaderless laboring class" and Hitler's approval of the memo led, as Browning noted, to a change in German policy in occupied Poland along the lines suggested by Himmler. Browning called the Göring-Frank–Himmler-Greiser dispute a perfect example of how Hitler encouraged his subordinates to engage in turf battles with one another without deciding for one policy or another but hinting at the policy he wanted.

== Awards ==
- 1994: National Jewish Book Award for Ordinary Men : Reserve Police Battalion 101 and the Final Solution in Poland
- 2004: National Jewish Book Award for The Origins of the Final Solution: The Evolution of Nazi Jewish Policy, September 1939 – March 1942
- 2010: National Jewish Book Award for Remembering Survival. Inside a Nazi Slave-labor Camp
- 2011: Yad Vashem International Book Prize for Holocaust Research for Remembering Survival.

== Selected works ==
- (1978). The Final Solution and the German Foreign Office: A study of Referat D III of Abteilung Deutschland, 1940–43. New York: Holmes & Meier. ISBN 978-0841904033
- (1981). "Zur Genesis der "Endlösung" Eine Antwort an Martin Broszat" pages 96–104 from Vierteljahrshefte für Zeitgeschichte, Volume 29.
- (1985). Fateful Months: Essays on the Emergence of the Final Solution. New York: Holmes & Meier.
- (1992). Ordinary Men: Reserve Police Battalion 101 and the Final Solution in Poland. New York: HarperCollins.
- (1992). The Path to Genocide: Essays on launching the Final Solution. Cambridge: Cambridge University Press.
- (2000). Nazi policy, Jewish workers, German killers. Cambridge and New York: Cambridge University Press.
- (2003). Collected memories: Holocaust History and Postwar Testimony, Madison, Wis. and London: University of Wisconsin Press.
- (2004). The Origins of the Final Solution: The Evolution of Nazi Jewish Policy, September 1939 – March 1942 (with contributions by Jürgen Matthäus). Lincoln: University of Nebraska Press. ISBN 0-803-25979-4 OCLC 52838928
- (2007). Every Day Lasts a Year: A Jewish Family's Correspondence from Poland. Cambridge : Cambridge University Press.
- (2010). Remembering Survival: Inside a Nazi Slave-Labor Camp. New York: W.W. Norton & Co. ISBN 0-393-07019-0 OCLC 317919861. This book earned Browning the 2011 Yad Vashem International Book Prize for Holocaust Research.
- (2015), with Michael Marrus, Susannah Heschel and Milton Shain, eds. Holocaust Scholarship: Personal Trajectories and Professional Interpretations. Basingstoke and New York: Palgrave Macmillan. ISBN 978-1137514189
- (2018). "The Suffocation of Democracy". The New York Review of Books. 65 (16). October 25, 2018.
