= Sarah Williams Goldhagen =

American author and architecture critic (born 1959)

Sarah Williams Goldhagen (born September 5, 1959) is an American author and architecture critic. She sits on the board of the Academy of Neuroscience for Architecture and the Advisory Committee for the Intentional Spaces summit convened by the International Arts+ Mind Lab at Johns Hopkins Medical School. Her advocacy for science-informed, human-centered design, her scholarship on modern architecture, her criticism for the New Republic and Architectural Record, and her writings on the perceptual and social psychology of built environmental experience call for improved architectural and urban design practices and recognition of their profound social impact. She is the author of Louis Kahn's Situated Modernism (2001), and Welcome to Your World: How the Built Environment Shapes Our Lives (2017), which the Salk Institute's Terrence Sejnowski says lays "the groundwork for a cognitive neuroscience of architecture."

== Biography ==
Sarah Williams Goldhagen was born in Princeton, New Jersey to Jeanne Tedesche Williams and Norman Williams, Jr. She grew up in Princeton and in Woodstock, Vermont. In 1985, she married the Polish artist Włodzimerz Książek and published for a decade under the name Sarah Ksiazek. Since 1999, Goldhagen has been married to author Daniel Jonah Goldhagen; Joan C. Williams, the feminist legal scholar, is her sister.

Goldhagen's father, Norman Williams Jr., a scholar of urban land planning and law, served as Chief of Master Planning and Director of the New York City Department of City Planning, and helped to establish the notion of exclusionary zoning through his publications from the mid-1950s onward. Williams’ American Land Planning Law (Chicago, 1975) was cited repeatedly in the landmark Mount Laurel case in New Jersey, for which he filed an amicus curiae brief on the part of the plaintiffs. Goldhagen often expresses her debt to her father for having introduced her to the historical, political and economic forces that shape the built environment.

Her undergraduate degree in English and American Literature (minor in Art History) is from Brown University (class of 1982), where she studied with William Jordy, and Johanna E. Ziegler, both of whom became important mentors. She did her graduate work (M.A. 1987, PhD. 1995) at the Department of Art History and Archeology at Columbia University in the City of New York, and taught at the University of Texas at Austin and Vassar College before her decade as assistant professor and then lecturer in History and Theory at the Harvard Graduate School of Design. In 2006 she resigned her faculty position to write full time.

== Personal life ==
Goldhagen has two children: a daughter, born 1996 of her previous marriage to Książek and a son (born 2000). Before Brown, she attended the Northfield Mount Hermon School (class of 1977). In 2017, she, her husband Daniel, and their son traveled the world for over six months, publishing a blog about their travels. She and her family live in a converted church in New York's East Harlem.

== Academic and literary career ==
Goldhagen's Louis Kahn's Situated Modernism (2001), which was grounded in her doctoral dissertation, demonstrates that architect Louis I. Kahn, who until then typically had been portrayed as a kind of historicizing, visionary mystic, developed his intellectual and artistic practice in dialogue with the major artistic, intellectual and social currents of the early postwar American culture, especially the imperative to strengthen the foundations of participatory democracy. Anxious Modernisms: Experimentation in Postwar Architectural Culture (2001), edited together with Réjean Legault, emerged from a conference Goldhagen organized for the Harvard Graduate School of Design in 1987; it contains her "Coda: Reconceptualizing the Modern" which, along with her 2008 "Something to Talk About: Modernism, Discourse, Style" in the Journal of the Society of Architectural Historians (translated into Spanish as "Algo de qué hablar: Modernismo, discurso, estilo",) presents a theorization of western architectural modernism's heterogeneous nature and discursive foundations.

From teaching in schools of architecture, Goldhagen came to appreciate that how people actually experience architecture and the built environment is under-studied, under-taught, and undertheorized, so she began looking toward the phenomenology of Maurice Merleau-Ponty as well as early work in embodied cognition by George Lakoff and Mark Johnson. In Stanford Anderson's edited collection Aalto and America (2016), she demonstrates that Alvar Aalto's parti for his Viipuri (Vyborg) Library was grounded in metaphors originating in embodied cognition, an idea that inspired her work on the embodied cognition's foundational role in built environmental experience. This, together with research from biophilia, cognitive neuroscience, and environmental psychology, came together in her retheorization of built environmental experience, Welcome to Your World.

Throughout her career Goldhagen, whom Paul Goldberger describes as "an excellent critic", has written for both scholarly and general audiences. As the New Republic's architecture critic, she published one of the earliest essays to call attention to the deplorable state of America's hard infrastructure ("American Collapse", 2007); an essay on the role of public/private partnerships in the aesthetic shaping of new urban parks ("Park Here", 2010); and critical assessments of work by, among others, Santiago Calatrava, Rem Koolhaas, Enrique Miralles, Jean Nouvel, SANAA, Frank Lloyd Wright, and Peter Zumthor. She has published widely in journals, magazines, and newspapers here and abroad, including in Art in America, Landscape Architecture, Chronicle of Higher Education, and The New York Times.

== Selected published works ==
=== Books and scholarly essays ===
- Welcome to Your World: How the Built Environment Shapes our Lives (2017). ISBN 0061957801, 978-0062996046; translated into Chinese, Korean, and Russian.
- "Alvar Aalto's Embodied Rationalism", in Aalto in America, ed. Stanford Anderson, Gail Fenske, and David Fixler (2016). ISBN 0300176007
- Global Citizen: The Architecture of Moshe Safdie (2015, with Donald Albrecht). ISBN 1785510282
- "Positioning Positions", Positions: On Modern Architecture and Theory (with Eric Mumford and Cor Wagenaar, 2010). ISBN 0816674558
- "Peabody Terrace", Sert Complete Work 1928-1979: Half a Century of Architecture (2005). ISBN 8493392871
- Louis Kahn's Situated Modernism (2001). ISBN 0300077866
- "Introduction: Critical Themes of Postwar Modernism" and "Coda: Reconceptualizing the Modern" in Anxious Modernists: Experimentation in Postwar Architectural Culture (Goldhagen and Réjean Legault, eds., 2001). ISBN 978-0262072083
- Richard Neutra's Windshield House (with Dietrich Neumann, et al., 2001). ISBN 0300092032

=== Criticism ===
- "Architecture's Most Irredeemable Cad", (on Frank Lloyd Wright), New York Times (2019).
- "Urban Pastorals", (on New York City waterfront developments), Art in America (2017).
- "The Great Architect Rebellion of 2014", (on Venice Biennale national pavilions), New Republic, (2014).
- "Rem's Rules", (2014, on Koolhaas's "Elements" exhibition at the Venice Biennale), Architectural Record.
- "All Work: Shanghai's Houtan Park Could be More Eager to Please", Landscape Architecture (2013).
- "Death by Nostalgia", New York Times (2011).
- "Park Here", New Republic (2010).
- "Stopped Making Sense" (on SANAA), New Republic (2008).
- "Making Waves", (on Frank Gehry, Enrique Miralles), New Republic (2008).
- "Santiago Calatrava's Overrated Architecture", New Republic (2006).
- "Our Degraded Public Realm: The Multiple Failures of Architectural Education", Chronicle of Higher Education (2003).
- "Putting Some Pizzaz Back in the Skyline", New York Times (2003).
- "Kool Houses, Kold Cities" (on Koolhaas), American Prospect (2002).
- "Boring Buildings: Why is American Architecture So Bad?", American Prospect (2001).
