= Daniel Blatman =

Israeli historian

Daniel Blatman (Hebrew: דניאל בלטמן) is an Israeli historian, specializing in history of the Holocaust. Blatman is the head of the Institute for Contemporary Jewry at the Hebrew University of Jerusalem.

== Early life and education ==
Blatman was born in Tel Aviv into an Eastern European Jewish family that included some Holocaust survivors and attended Tichon Hadash high school. He studied the history of contemporary Judaism at the Hebrew University of Jerusalem, from which he graduated in 1981 before obtaining a master's degree in 1988. After teaching at Danziger high school in Kiryat Shmona from 1981 to 1992, he completed a doctorate in 1993 under the supervision of Israel Gutman.

== Career history ==
From 1997, Blatman taught at his alma mater and, in 2009, became an associate professor at the Institute of Contemporary Judaism. He also teaches at Georgetown University in Washington, at the École des Hautes Études en Sciences Sociales in Paris and at the Jagiellonian University in Kraków. He was a visiting scholar at the Centre for European Studies at Harvard University, 2012–13 and a visiting professor at the History Department of the Paris Institute of Political Studies in 2013–14. He is the chief historian of the Warsaw Ghetto Museum.

Blatman's book The Death Marches, published in 2012, was researched over more than a decade across 20 archives in eight countries. He presents an account of the forced marches of concentration camp prisoners in the waning months of World War II. His study reveals the ethnic and religious diversity of the victims, who included not only Jews. He argues that these marches represented the final phase of Nazi genocide. Despite the lack of a formal extermination plan for these prisoners, the SS guards routinely murdered them, not out of individual hatred or rage, but guided by a deeply internalized genocidal mindset. This mentality, which was shaped by years of ideological indoctrination, viewed the prisoners as both racially inferior and a looming threat to German society. In contrast, Allied POWs, though also marched, were not targeted for mass killing, illustrating the Nazi regime's racial logic. Blatman also explores civilian complicity. While some Germans tried to help the prisoners, many others from ordinary townspeople to paramilitaries and Hitler Youth, actively participated in the violence. Motivated by fear, propaganda, and a collapsing social order, they assisted in shootings and manhunts. His analysis illustrates how genocide can unfold through decentralized, bureaucratically unplanned acts driven by ideology and fear.

== Books ==
- Blatman, Daniel (2003). For Our Freedom and Yours: The Jewish Labour Bund in Poland 1939-1949. London: Vallentine Mitchell. ISBN 0-85303-449-4.
- Blatman, Daniel (2011). The Death Marches: The Final Phase of Nazi Genocide. Chaya Galai (translator). Harvard University Press. ISBN 978-0-674-05919-1.

== Criticism of the Israeli Government ==
Associated with the proposed 2023 Israeli judicial reform, the Likud-led far-right coalition was compared to Germany in the 1930s by some journalists and historians in Israel including Daniel Blatman, an Israeli historian, specializing in history of the Holocaust, and head of the Institute for Contemporary Jewry at the Hebrew University of Jerusalem. When interviewed by Ayelett Suhani for Haaretz, Blatman said "Israel's government has neo-Nazi ministers. It really does recall Germany in 1933". His remarks drew some international attention from long-standing critics of Israel. However, he was referring specifically to the authoritarian aspects of 1930s Germany, he did not draw direct connections to the ghettos or the Holocaust.

Blatman is listed in the signatures on the open letter "Statement of Genocide Scholars on Israel-Palestine" dated 21 May 2021.

In 2016 Blatman criticised Benjamin Netanyahu for referring to removal of Israeli settlers from the West Bank as "ethnic cleansing". This triggered a discourse with Benny Morris, in which Blatman asserted that ethnic cleansing had been done by Israel in 1948.

In May 2025, Blatman accused Israel of carrying out genocide in Gaza: "I have been engaged in researching the Holocaust for about 40 years. I never imagined in my worst nightmares that the Jewish state would bomb starving children to death".

== Prizes ==
- 1991: The Pridan Prize for Studies in East European Jewish History, Hebrew University.
- 1993: Jakob Buchman Prize for the Memory of the Holocaust
- 2011: Yad Vashem International Book Prize for Holocaust Research
