= Ion Popa (historian) =

Academic background
- Education: University of Manchester

Academic work
- Discipline: History

Ion Popa is a historian who studies the role of Christian churches in the Holocaust. He received his doctorate from Manchester University in 2014. His book The Romanian Orthodox Church and the Holocaust received the 2018 Yad Vashem International Book Prize for Holocaust Research. From 2012 to 2013, he held a Ausnit Fellowship at the United States Holocaust Memorial Museum.

== Works ==
- Popa, Ion (2017). The Romanian Orthodox Church and the Holocaust. Indiana University Press. ISBN 978-0-253-02989-8.
