= Eliminationist antisemitism =

Extreme form of hatred of Jews

Eliminationist antisemitism is an extreme form of antisemitism which seeks to completely purge Jews and Judaism from society, either through genocide or through other means. Eliminationist antisemitism evolved from older concepts of religious antisemitism. The concept was developed by Daniel Goldhagen in his book Hitler's Willing Executioners to describe German antisemitism in the twentieth century, but has since been adapted and used to describe antisemitism in other societies and eras.

== Origin ==
The concept was originally developed by Daniel Goldhagen in his book Hitler's Willing Executioners, in which he proposed that Germans harbored uniquely eliminationist antisemitism which led them to perpetrate the Holocaust. Robert Wistrich is another historian who has written about the idea of eliminationist antisemitism with regards to Germany, although he does not believe the phenomenon is unique to Germany. Goldhagen's thesis is not accepted by most historians of Germany. For example, Helmut Walser Smith argues that "eliminationst antisemitism" was not common in Imperial Germany, but was found on the fringes of society voiced by such figures as Theodor Fritsch.

Although he criticizes some aspects of Goldhagen's thesis, Aristotle Kallis contends that as Golhagen argues, eliminationism justifies ethnic cleansing and genocide by making such crimes seem desirable and justified to the perpetrators and their society.

== Other uses ==
In his more recent book The Devil that Never Dies: The Rise and Threat of Global Anti-Semitism, Goldhagen argued that eliminationist antisemitism has grown and spread since World War II. The concept has since been adapted and is used to describe other antisemitism in other societies, such as Polish antisemitism and antisemitism in the Muslim world. For example, Robert Blobaum has argued that the antisemitism in Poland in the early twentieth century should be considered "eliminationist" because its aim was to completely remove the Jews from Poland. The "a-semitism" of the Arrow Cross Party in Hungary has also been described as eliminationist. Goldhagen's concept has also been expanded to analyze other forms of "eliminationist racism".

== See also ==
- 1988 Hamas charter
- Gharqad
- Khaybar Khaybar ya yahud
- From the river to the sea
