= Moral Panic: Changing Concepts of the Child Molester in Modern America =

1998 history book

- Author: Philip Jenkins
- Subject: 20th century American history, child protection
- Published: 1998
- Publisher: Yale University Press
- Pages: 302 pp
- ISBN: 0-300-07387-9

Moral Panic: Changing Concepts of the Child Molester in Modern America is a 1998 American history book by American historian Philip Jenkins. The book analyses public reactions to child sexual abuse throughout the 20th century, the influence of child molestation scandals on American law and culture, and the effects of such scandals on the shifting popular and scientific beliefs regarding child sexual abuse and child sexuality throughout the century. The book employs Stanley Cohen's and Stuart Hall's concept of moral panic to analyze such events related to child molestation in the 1910s, 1940s and 1980s.

== Contents ==
Moral Panic investigates three moral panics related to child molestation in the United States, the first of which occurred from 1908 to 1916, the second from 1935 to 1955, and the third which started in 1976 and continued to the end of the century. In the book, Jenkins describes how mass media, law-enforcement agencies, legislators and other social groups repeatedly exaggerated the threat of child sexual abuse in several periods of the 20th century. He also analyses newspapers, films, fiction books and other media to assess popular attitudes and beliefs regarding the dynamics of child sexual abuse and child sexuality.

The book also examines a period of American history, lasting from the 1950s to the 1960s, in which child sexual abuse received less attention from popular media. Jenkins states in the book that, in the early 1930s and throughout the 1960s, social sciences began supporting the idea that deviant sexual behaviors were not harmful to minors and, in the second period, downplayed the effects of sexual interactions between adults and underage people. In the 1970s, an event which he called the "child sexual abuse revolution" brought the issue of child sexual abuse back into prominence. The book covers the social reactions to child abductions in the 1970s and 1980s, child pornography and "pedophile rings" in the mid-1980s, the day-care sex-abuse panic, the satanic panic, internet sex rings and the moral panic over sexual predators in the 1990s.

The book further describes how child sexual abuse concerns were used by American conservatives in the 1990s to censor the Internet, persecute homosexuals and increase social control over the youth. Jenkins also argues that U.S. states have infringed against suspects' basic constitutional rights and engaged in practices including shock therapy, psychosurgery, and psychotropic drugs. He also covers the development of Megan's Law and investigates how child sexual abuse concerns played a role in the overturning of the rehabilitative criminal justice system of the United States in the 1980s.
