= Paul Collins (Australian religious writer) =

Australian religious writer

Paul Collins (born March 1940 in Melbourne, Australia) is an Australian historian, broadcaster and writer currently based in Canberra.

== Doctrinal controversy ==
In March 2001 Collins resigned from his role as a Catholic priest due to a dispute with the Vatican’s Congregation for the Doctrine of the Faith over his book, Papal Power. In explaining his resignation, he cited the increasing rigidity and sectarianism of the Vatican, stating that the August 2000 declaration Dominus Iesus expressed "a profoundly anti-ecumenical spirit at odds with the sense of God’s grace permeating the whole cosmos".

== Writings ==
- Mixed Blessings (Penguin Books, 1986)
- No Set Agenda: Australia’s Catholic Church faces an uncertain future (David Lovell Publishing, 1992)
- God's Earth: Religion as if matter really mattered (Harper Collins, 1995)
- Papal Power: A proposal for change in Catholicism's third millennium (Harper Collins, 1997)
- Upon This Rock: The popes and their changing role (Melbourne University Press, 2000)
- From Inquisition to Freedom: Seven prominent Catholics and their struggle with the Vatican (Simon and Schuster, 2001)
- Hell's Gates: The terrible journey of Alexander Pearce, Van Diemen's Land cannibal (Hardie Grant, 2002)
- Between The Rock and a Hard Place: Being Catholic today (ABC Books, 2004)
- God's New Man: The legacy of Pope John Paul II and the election of Benedict XVI (Melbourne University Press, 2006)
- Burn: The epic story of bushfire in Australia (Allen & Unwin, 2006)
- Believers: Does Australian Catholicism have a Future? (UNSW Press, 2008)
- Judgment Day: The struggle for life on Earth (UNSW Press, 2010)
- The birth of the West: Rome, Germany, France, and the Creation of Europe in the Tenth Century (The Perseus Books Group, 2013)
- A Very Contrary Irishman: The life and travels of Jeremiah O'Flynn (Morning Star, 2014)
- Absolute Power: How the Pope became the most influential man in the world (PublicAffairs, 2018)
