= Norman A. Beck =

American pastor

- Born: February 27, 1932 (age 93)
- Other names: Norman Arthur Beck
- Occupation: Pastor

Norman Arthur Beck (born February 27, 1932) is an Evangelical Lutheran Church in America pastor, and he serves as the contract pastor of St. John's Lutheran Church in Stockdale (Denhawken), Texas. He is also a Minnie Stevens Piper Foundation Professor, and writes and speaks about the relationships between Judaism, Christianity and Islam. Additionally, Beck serves as Poehlmann Professor of Theology and Classical Languages at Texas Lutheran University, currently teaching Intro to Theology, New Testament Studies, History of Religions, Elementary Greek, New Testament Greek Reading, Biblical Hebrew, as well as various Freshman Experience courses.

== Education ==
- Doctorate from Princeton Theological Seminary
- Bachelor of Divinity from Trinity Lutheran Seminary
- Bachelor of Arts from Capital University
- Honorary Doctorate of Divinity from Trinity Lutheran Seminary

== Published books ==
- Anti-Roman Cryptograms in the New Testament: Hidden Transcripts of Hope and Liberation (Revised Edition)
- Mature Christianity: The Recognition and Repudiation of the Anti-Jewish Polemic of the New Testament
- Anti-Roman Cryptograms in the New Testament: Symbolic Messages of Hope and Liberation
- Mature Christianity in the 21st Century (Shared Ground Among Jews and Christians)
- The New Testament: A New Translation and Redaction
- Jesus: The Man a screenplay

== Signed statements ==
He was among the signers of "The Passion of the Christ, Jewish Pain, and Christian Responsibility: A Response to Mel Gibson's Film; A Statement by Concerned Christians" in September 2004 . He was among the signers of "An Open Letter Concerning Religion and Science," signed by members of the clergy and addressed to school board members asking them to continue teaching evolution as sound science, affirming that this did not conflict with religious beliefs .
