= Christoph Dieckmann (historian) =

German historian of modern age

Christoph Dieckmann (born 1960) is a German historian and author.

== Life ==
Dieckmann studied history, sociology and economics at University of Göttingen, Hebrew University of Jerusalem, and the University of Hamburg. He received his doctorate in 2003 at University of Freiburg under the supervision of Ulrich Herbert, his dissertation focused on the German WWII policy in Lithuania, and his subsequent research and work has focused on the same topic.

Dieckmann taught modern history at Keele University from 2005 to 2014. He subsequently worked on the Yiddish Historiography on the Russian Civil War at the Fritz Bauer Institut. Since 2017, he has been with the University of Bern.

In 2012, he was awarded the Yad Vashem International Book Prize for Holocaust Research for his two volume work Deutsche Besatzungspolitik in Litauen 1941-1944 ("German Occupation Policy in Lithuania 1941-1944.").

== Books ==
- Deutsche Besatzungspolitik in Litauen 1941–1944, 2 Bände, Wallstein, Göttingen 2011, ISBN 978-3-8353-0929-6 (Dissertation Universität Freiburg im Breisgau 2003, 2 Bände)
- Im Ghetto 1939–1945. Neue Forschungen zu Alltag und Umfeld, hrsg. zus. mit Babette Quinkert, Wallstein, Göttingen 2009, ISBN 978-3-8353-0510-6.
- Kooperation und Verbrechen. Formen der »Kollaboration« im östlichen Europa 1939–1945, hrsg. zus. mit Babette Quinkert und Tatjana Tönsmeyer, Wallstein Verlag, Göttingen 2003
- Die nationalsozialistischen Konzentrationslager. Entwicklung und Struktur, hrsg. zus. mit Karin Orth und Ulrich Herbert, Wallstein Verlag, Göttingen 1998
