= Philip Jenkins =

American academic (born 1952)

- Born: April 3, 1952 (age 74); Port Talbot, Wales
- Education: Clare College, Cambridge
- Scientific career
- Fields: Humanities, history, religious studies, criminal justice, American studies
- Workplaces: Pennsylvania State University, Baylor University

Philip Jenkins (born April 3, 1952) is an American professor of history at Baylor University in the United States, and co-director for Baylor's Program on Historical Studies of Religion in the Institute for Studies of Religion. He is also the Edwin Erle Sparks Professor of Humanities Emeritus at Pennsylvania State University (PSU). He was professor (from 1993) and a distinguished professor (from 1997) of history and religious studies at the same institution; and also assistant, associate and then full professor of criminal justice and American studies at PSU, 1980–93.

Jenkins is a contributing editor for The American Conservative and writes a monthly column for The Christian Century. He has also written articles for Christianity Today, First Things, and The Atlantic.

== Early life and work ==
Jenkins was born in Port Talbot, Wales, on April 3, 1952. He studied at Clare College, Cambridge, taking double first–class honours, in 1974, in both History and Anglo-Saxon, Norse and Celtic. Jenkins then studied for his PhD under the supervision of Sir John Plumb among others. Between 1977 and 1980, Jenkins worked as a researcher for Sir Leon Radzinowicz, the pioneer of criminology studies at Cambridge.

In 1979, Jenkins won the BBC quiz show Mastermind.

== Academic career ==
In 1980, Jenkins was appointed Assistant Professor of Criminal Justice at Pennsylvania State University, which marked a change in his research focus. Jenkins has forged a reputation based on his work on global Christianity as well as on emerging religious movements. Other research interests include post-1970 American history and crime.

He conducted a study of the Quran and the Bible in the light of the September 11 attacks amid accusations that the Quran incites violence. "Much to my surprise, the Islamic scriptures in the Quran were actually far less bloody and less violent than those in the Bible," he concluded, noting that Quranic violence is primarily defensive. (See also Violence in the Bible and Violence in the Quran.)

== Public intellectual ==
In 2002 Jenkins, a Catholic-turned-Episcopalian, discussed the Catholic sex abuse cases by asserting that his "research of cases over the past 20 years indicates no evidence whatever that Catholic or other celibate clergy are any more likely to be involved in misconduct or abuse than clergy of any other denomination—or indeed, than non-clergy. However determined news media may be to see this affair as a crisis of celibacy, the charge is just unsupported."

In a 2010 interview with National Public Radio, Jenkins stated that he believes that "the Islamic scriptures in the Quran were actually far less bloody and less violent than those in the Bible" and cites explicit instructions in the Old Testament calling for genocide, while the Quran calls for primarily defensive war. Jenkins went on to state that Christianity, Islam, and Judaism had undergone a process that he refers to as "holy amnesia", in which violence in sacred texts became symbolic action against one's sins. According to him, Islam had until recently (as of the time of the interview) also undergone the same process in which jihad became an internal struggle rather than war.

== Public lectures ==
In 2006 Jenkins delivered the twentieth Erasmus Lecture, titled Believing in the Global South, sponsored by First Things magazine and the Institute on Religion and Public Life. In his address, Jenkins examined the demographic and theological transformation of global Christianity, highlighting the rise of vibrant Christian communities in Africa, Asia, and Latin America. He argued that this shift toward the Global South represents one of the most significant developments in modern religious history, reshaping the future of Christian thought, worship, and social engagement.

== Bibliography ==
- The Making of a Ruling Class: The Glamorgan Gentry 1640–1790. Cambridge University Press. 1983. 353 pp.
- Crime and Justice: Issues and Ideas. Monterey, CA: Brooks-Cole. 1984. 211 pp.
- A History of Modern Wales 1536–1990. London: Longmans. 1992. 451 pp.
- Intimate Enemies: Moral Panics in Contemporary Great Britain. Hawthorne, NY: Aldine de Gruyter. 1992. 262 pp.
- Using Murder: The Social Construction of Serial Homicide. Hawthorne, NY: Aldine de Gruyter. 1994. 262 pp.
- Pedophiles and Priests: Anatomy of a Contemporary Crisis. New York: Oxford University Press. 1996. 214 pp.
- A History of the United States. London: Macmillan/New York: St. Martin's Press. 1997. 317 pp.
- Hoods and Shirts: The Extreme Right in Pennsylvania 1925–1950. Chapel Hill, NC: University of North Carolina Press. 1997. 343 pp.
- Moral Panic: Changing Concepts of the Child Molester in Modern America. New Haven, CT: Yale University Press. 1998. 302 pp.
- The Cold War at Home: The Red Scare in Pennsylvania 1945–1960. University of North Carolina Press. 1999. 271 pp.
- Synthetic Panics: The Politics of Designer Drugs. New York University Press. 1999. 247 pp.
- Mystics and Messiahs: Cults and New Religions in American History. New York: Oxford University Press. 2000. ISBN 978-0-19-512744-7. 294 pp.
- Beyond Tolerance: Child Pornography on the Internet. New York University Press. 2001. 259 pp.
- Hidden Gospels: How the Search for Jesus Lost Its Way. New York: Oxford University Press. 2001. 260 pp.
- The Next Christendom: The Rise of Global Christianity. New York: Oxford University Press. 2002. 270 pp. (translated into many languages, including Chinese in Taiwan).
- Images of Terror: What We Can And Can't Know About Terrorism. Hawthorne, NY: Aldine de Gruyter. 2003. 227 pp.
- The New Anti-Catholicism: The Last Acceptable Prejudice. New York: Oxford University Press. 2003. 258 pp.
- Dream Catchers: How Mainstream America Discovered Native Spirituality. New York: Oxford University Press. 2004. 306 pp.
- Decade of Nightmares: The End of the 1960s and the Making of Eighties America. New York: Oxford University Press. 2006. 344 pp.
- The New Faces of Christianity: Believing the Bible in the Global South. New York: Oxford University Press. 2006. ISBN 978-0-19-530065-9. 193 pp.
- God's Continent: Christianity, Islam, and Europe's Religious Crisis. New York: Oxford University Press. 2007. 353 pp.
- The Lost History of Christianity: The Thousand-Year Golden Age of the Church in the Middle East, Africa, and Asia - and How It Died. San Francisco: HarperOne. 2008. ISBN 9780061472800.
- Jesus Wars: How Four Patriarchs, Three Queens, and Two Emperors Decided What Christians Would Believe for the Next 1,500 Years. New York: Harper One. 2010. ISBN 9780061768941. 328 pp.
- Laying Down the Sword: Why We Can't Ignore the Bible's Violent Verses. New York: HarperOne. 2011. ISBN 978-0-06199071-7. 320 pp.
- The Great and Holy War: How World War I Became a Religious Crusade. New York: HarperOne. 2014. ISBN 978-0-06210509-7. 448 pp.
- The Many Faces of Christ: The Thousand Year Story of the Survival and Influence of the Lost Gospels. New York: Basic Books, 2015. ISBN 978-0465066926. 336 pp.
- Crucible of Faith: The Ancient Revolution that Made Our Modern Religious World. New York: Basic Books. 2017. ISBN 978-0-465-09640-4. 336 pp.
- Fertility and Faith: The Demographic Revolution That Is Transforming All The World's Religions. Waco: Baylor University Press. 2020. ISBN 978-1-481-31131-1. 262 pp.
- Climate, Catastrophe, and Faith: How Changes in Climate Drive Religious Upheaval. New York: Oxford University Press. 2021. ISBN 978-0-197-50621-9. 257 pp.
- A Global History of the Cold War, 1945-1991. New York: Palgrave Macmillan. 2021. ISBN 978-3-030-81365-9. 268 pp.
- He Will Save You from the Deadly Pestilence: The Many Lives of Psalm 91. New York: Oxford University Press. 2022. ISBN 978-0-197-60564-6. 256 pp.
- A Storm of Images: Iconoclasm and Religious Reformation in the Byzantine World. Waco: Baylor University Press. 2023. ISBN 978-148-131822-8. 287 pp.
- Kingdoms of This World: How Empires Have Made and Remade Religions. Waco: Baylor University Press. 2025. ISBN 978-1-481-31993-5. 350 pp.
