= The New Anti-Catholicism =

2003 book written by Philip Jenkins

The New Anti-Catholicism: The Last Acceptable Prejudice
- Paperback cover
- Author: Philip Jenkins
- Language: English
- Subject: History of Anti-Catholicism in the United States
- Publisher: Oxford University Press
- Publication date: April 17, 2003
- Publication place: United States
- Media type: Hardcover, paperback
- Pages: 258 pages (1st edition, hardcover)
- ISBN: 0-19-515480-0 (1st edition, hardcover)
- OCLC: 50410476
- Dewey Decimal: 305.6/2073 21
- LC Class: BX1770 .J46 2003

The New Anti-Catholicism: The Last Acceptable Prejudice is a book written by Philip Jenkins, Distinguished Professor of History and Religious studies at Pennsylvania State University, dealing with contemporary anti-Catholic bigotry, particularly in the United States.

Jenkins, a former Catholic who converted to the Episcopal Church in 1980, argues that bigotry and hatred toward Catholics is not a thing of the past, but rather is still thriving in the U.S. In Jenkins's view it is a form of bigotry that is ignored or even accepted or encouraged in quarters (mainly politically and culturally liberal ones) that would not tolerate most other forms of bigotry.

A statement that is seen as racist, misogynistic, antisemitic, or homophobic can haunt a speaker for years, writes Jenkins, but it is still possible to make hostile and vituperative public statements about Catholicism without fear of serious repercussions.

== Reception ==
The Washington Post review called it "A provocative brief on some of the uglier prejudices lurking behind today's Catholic controversies." The National Catholic Register, calling Jenkins "the foremost historian of religious trends today", reviewed the book favorably, noting that the issues are particularly topical today. The Tablet, a British Catholic publication, in its review, while admitting that the book raised important issues, accused Jenkins of lacking a sense of humor. In 2009, National Review suggested that the author ought to consider publishing an updated version in light of recent incidents of anti-Catholicism. The Baltimore Sun called it "a book of powerfully convincing fairness, of impressive scholarship and of extraordinary courage – Jenkins strips naked some of the most cherished hypocrisies of American ideologues from one extreme of the spectrum to the other."
