= A. Roy Eckardt =

American Methodist theologian and pastor (1918–1998)

Arthur Roy Eckardt (August 8, 1918 – May 5, 1998) was an American theologian and pastor in the United Methodist Church, described as "a pioneer in Christian–Jewish relations". In 1979 President Jimmy Carter named Eckardt a special consultant to the President's Commission on the Holocaust. Along with his wife, Alice L. Eckardt, he wrote many books.

== Books ==
- On the Way to Death
- Sitting in the Earth and Laughing
- How to Tell God from the Devil
- On the Way to Death
- Long Night's Journey into Day
- For Righteousness' Sake
- Elder and Younger Brothers
- Theologian at Work
- Encounter with Israel
- Black Woman Jew
