= Daniel Goldhagen =

American author and academic (born 1959)

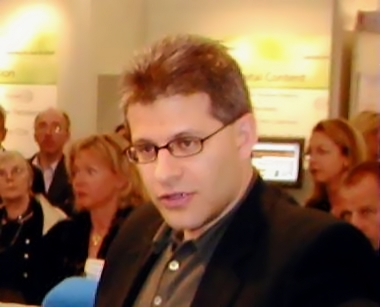
- Born: Daniel Jonah Goldhagen; June 30, 1959 (age 67); Boston, Massachusetts, U.S.
- Education: Harvard University (BA, MA, PhD)
- Spouse: Sarah Williams Goldhagen (m. 1999)
- Children: 1
- Writing career
- Notable works: Hitler's Willing Executioners (1996); A Moral Reckoning (2002)

Daniel Jonah Goldhagen (born June 30, 1959) is an American author, and former associate professor of government and social studies at Harvard University. Goldhagen received attention as the author of two controversial books about the Holocaust: Hitler's Willing Executioners (1996) and A Moral Reckoning (2002). He is also the author of Worse Than War (2009), which examines the phenomenon of genocide, and The Devil That Never Dies (2013), in which he traces a worldwide rise in virulent antisemitism.

== Biography ==
Daniel Goldhagen was born in Boston, Massachusetts in a Jewish family, to Erich, a retired academic lecturer then professor, and Norma Goldhagen. He grew up in nearby Newton. His wife Sarah (née Williams) is an architectural historian, and critic for The New Republic magazine.

Goldhagen's father was interned in Czernowitz (which later became part of Ukraine in 1991). Goldhagen has written that his "understanding of Nazism and of the Holocaust is firmly indebted" to his father's influence. In 1977, Goldhagen entered Harvard, and remained there for some twenty years - first as an undergraduate and graduate student, then as an assistant professor in the Government and Social Studies Department.

During graduate studies, he attended a lecture by Saul Friedländer, in which he had what he describes as a "lightbulb moment": The functionalism versus intentionalism debate did not address the question, "When Hitler ordered the annihilation of the Jews, why did people execute the order?". Goldhagen wanted to investigate who the German men and women who killed the Jews were, and their reasons for killing.

== Academic and literary career ==
As a graduate student, Goldhagen undertook research in the German archives. The thesis of Hitler's Willing Executioners: Ordinary Germans and the Holocaust proposes that, during the Holocaust, many killers were ordinary Germans, who killed due to being raised in a profoundly anti-semitic culture, and thus were acculturated—"ready and willing"—to execute the Nazi government's genocidal plans.

Goldhagen's first notable work was a book review titled "False Witness" published by The New Republic magazine on April 17, 1989. It was one in a series of hostile reviews of the 1988 book Why Did the Heavens Not Darken? by an American-Jewish professor of Princeton University born in Luxembourg, Arno J. Mayer. Goldhagen wrote that "Mayer's enormous intellectual error" was in ascribing the cause of the Holocaust to anti-Communism, rather than to antisemitism, and criticized Mayer for saying that most massacres of Jews in the USSR, during the first weeks of Operation Barbarossa in the summer of 1941, were committed by local peoples (see the Lviv pogroms and Babyn Yar for more historical background), with little Wehrmacht participation. Goldhagen accused him also of misrepresenting the facts about the Wannsee Conference (1942), which was meant for plotting the genocide of European Jews, not (as Mayer said) merely the resettlement of the Jews. Goldhagen further accused Mayer of obscurantism, of suppressing historical fact, and of being an apologist for Nazi Germany, like Ernst Nolte, for attempting to "de-demonize" National Socialism. Also in 1989, historian Lucy Dawidowicz reviewed Why Did the Heavens Not Darken? in Commentary magazine, and praised Goldhagen's "False Witness" review, identifying him as a rising Holocaust historian who formally rebutted "Mayer's falsification" of history.

In 2003, Goldhagen resigned from Harvard to focus on writing. His work synthesizes four historical elements, kept distinct for analysis; as presented in the books A Moral Reckoning: the Role of the Catholic Church in the Holocaust and its Unfulfilled Duty of Repair (2002) and Worse Than War (2009): (i) description (what happens), (ii) explanation (why it happens), (iii) moral evaluation (judgment), and (iv) prescription (what is to be done?). According to Goldhagen, his Holocaust studies address questions about the political, social, and cultural particulars behind other genocides: "Who did the killing?" and "What, despite temporal and cultural differences, do mass killings have in common?", which yielded Worse Than War: Genocide, Eliminationism, and the Ongoing Assault on Humanity, about the global nature of genocide, and averting such crimes against humanity.

== Books ==
=== Hitler's Willing Executioners ===
Hitler's Willing Executioners (1996) posits that the vast majority of ordinary Germans were "willing executioners" in the Holocaust because of a unique and virulent "eliminationist antisemitism" in German identity that Goldhagen claimed had developed in the preceding centuries. Goldhagen argued that this form of antisemitism was widespread in Germany, that it was unique to Germany, and that because of it, ordinary Germans willingly killed Jews. Goldhagen asserted that this mentality grew out of medieval attitudes with a religious basis, but was eventually secularized. Goldhagen's book was meant to be a "thick description" in the manner of Clifford Geertz. As such, to prove his thesis Goldhagen focused particularly on the behavior of the men of Order Police (Orpo) Reserve Battalion 101 in occupied Poland in 1942 to argue ordinary Germans possessed by "eliminationist anti-Semitism" chose to willingly murder Jews in cruel and sadistic ways. Scholars such as Otto Kulka and Israel Gutman among others had asserted, before Goldhagen, the primacy of ideology, radical antisemitism, and the corollary of inimitability exclusive to Germany.

The book, which began as a doctoral dissertation, was written largely as a response to Christopher Browning's Ordinary Men: Reserve Police Battalion 101 and the Final Solution in Poland (1992). Much of Goldhagen's book was concerned with the same Order Police battalion, but with very different conclusions. On April 8, 1996, Browning and Goldhagen discussed their differences during a symposium hosted by the United States Holocaust Memorial Museum. Browning's book recognizes the impact of the endless campaign of antisemitic propaganda, but it takes other factors into account, such as: fear of breaking ranks, desire for career advancement, concern not to be viewed as weak, the effects of state bureaucracy, battlefield conditions, and peer-bonding. Goldhagen does not acknowledge the impact of these influences.

Goldhagen's book went on to win the American Political Science Association's 1994 Gabriel A. Almond Award in comparative politics and the Democracy Prize of the Journal for German and International Politics. Time magazine reported that it was one of the two most important books of 1996.

The book sparked controversy in the press and academic circles, in America and internationally. Several historians characterized its reception as an extension of the Historikerstreit, the German historiographical debate of the 1980s that sought to explain Nazi history. The book was a "publishing phenomenon", achieving fame in both the United States and Germany despite being criticized by some historians, who called it ahistorical.

Historians' criticisms of the book centered on three shortcomings: It did not provide convincing evidence to support its basic premise, that the vast majority of "ordinary" Germans willingly took part in the Holocaust (and that they had done so because of their uniquely German, "eliminationist anti-Semitic mind-set"); it focused on the genocidal behavior of Reserve Police Battalion 101, and without further explanation or rationale, extrapolated the genocidal behavior of that single police unit to all of German society; Goldhagen cherry-picked his primary and secondary sources, and entirely ignored evidence that did not support his thesis.

Due to its alleged "generalizing hypothesis" about Germans, it has been characterized as anti-German. The Israeli historian Yehuda Bauer claims that "Goldhagen stumbles badly" and "Goldhagen's thesis does not work", and charges "that the anti-German bias of his book, almost a racist bias (however much he may deny it), leads nowhere". The American historian Fritz Stern denounced the book as unscholarly and full of racist Germanophobia. Raul Hilberg summarised the debates, "by the end of 1996, it was clear that in sharp distinction from lay readers, much of the academic world had wiped Goldhagen off the map".

=== A Moral Reckoning ===
In 2002, Goldhagen published A Moral Reckoning: The Role of the Catholic Church in the Holocaust and Its Unfulfilled Duty of Repair, his account of the role of the Catholic Church before, during and after World War II. In the book, Goldhagen acknowledges that individual Catholic bishops and priests hid and saved a large number of Jews, but also asserts that others promoted or accepted antisemitism before and during the war, and some played a direct role in the persecution of Jews in Europe during the Holocaust.

David Dalin and Joseph Bottum of The Weekly Standard criticized the book, calling it a "misuse of the Holocaust to advance [an] anti-Catholic agenda", and poor scholarship. Goldhagen noted in an interview with The Atlantic, as well as in the book's introduction, that the title and the first page of the book reveal its purpose as a moral, rather than historical analysis, asserting that he has invited European Church representatives to present their own historical account in discussing morality and reparation.

=== Worse Than War ===
In Worse than War: Genocide, Eliminationism, and the Ongoing Assault on Humanity (2009), Goldhagen described Nazism and the Holocaust as "eliminationist assaults". He worked on the book intermittently for a decade, interviewing atrocity perpetrators and victims in Rwanda, Bosnia, Guatemala, Cambodia, Kenya, and the USSR, and politicians, government officers, and private humanitarian organization officers. Goldhagen states that his aim is to help "craft institutions and politics that will save countless lives and also lift the lethal threat under which so many people live". He concludes that eliminationist assaults are preventable because "the world's non-mass-murdering countries are wealthy and powerful, having prodigious military capabilities (and they can band together)", whereas the perpetrator countries "are overwhelmingly poor and weak".

The book was cinematically adapted, and the documentary film of Worse Than War was first presented in the U.S. in Aspen, Colorado, on August 6, 2009 – the 64th anniversary of the atomic bombing of Hiroshima in 1945. In Germany, the documentary was first broadcast by the ARD television network on October 18, 2009, and was to be nationally broadcast by PBS in 2010.

Adam Jones, who praised this book for its fluid style and commendable passion, concludes however, that the book is undermined by a casual approach to basic research, and by the author's tendency to overreach and overstate his case. The British historian David Elstein accused Goldhagen of manipulating his sources to make a false accusation of genocide against the British during the Mau Mau Uprising of the 1950s in Kenya. Elstein wrote in his view that the chapter on Kenya left Goldhagen open "...to the charge that he is the kind of scholar who is either unaware of the facts or prefers to exclude those which do not fit his thesis".

David Rieff questions Goldhagen's conclusion that, in order to prevent "eliminationism", the United Nations should be remade into an interventionist entity focusing on "a devoted international push for democratizing more countries".

== Personal life ==
Goldhagen has been a vegetarian since the age of 10. Since 1999, Goldhagen has been married to Sarah Williams Goldhagen.

== Selected works ==
- 1989: "False Witness", The New Republic, April 17, 1989, Volume 200, No. 16, Issue # 3, pp. 39–44
- 1996: Hitler's Willing Executioners: Ordinary Germans and The Holocaust, Alfred A. Knopf, New York, ISBN 978-0-679-44695-8
- 2002: A Moral Reckoning: The Role of the Catholic Church in the Holocaust and Its Unfulfilled Duty of Repair, Alfred A. Knopf, New York, ISBN 978-0-375-41434-3
- 2009: Worse Than War: Genocide, Eliminationism, and the Ongoing Assault On Humanity, PublicAffairs, New York, ISBN 978-1-58648-769-0
- 2013: The Devil That Never Dies: The Rise and Threat of Global Anti-Semitism
