= Bibliography of the Holocaust =

This is a selected bibliography and other resources for The Holocaust, including prominent primary sources, historical studies, notable survivor accounts and autobiographies, as well as other documentation that helps to establish the event horizon of the Nazi genocide.

The Holocaust literature is extensive: The Bibliography on Holocaust Literature (edited by Abraham Edelheit and Hershel Edelheit) in its 1993 update listed around 20,000 items, including books, journal articles, pamphlets, newspaper stories and dissertations. Documentation by organizations such as Yad Vashem (including précis of individual fates) enters into the millions.

Conversely, in a 1989 publication, Abraham Foxman, the national director of the Anti-Defamation League (ADL) from 1987 to 2015, estimated that there were 200 books denying the Holocaust. The number of works devoted to the history of the Holocaust, and to the literature of denialism has grown since that time.

== Bibliography ==
=== Primary sources ===
"The Mass Extermination of Jews in German Occupied Poland", a note issued by the Polish government-in-exile, 1942

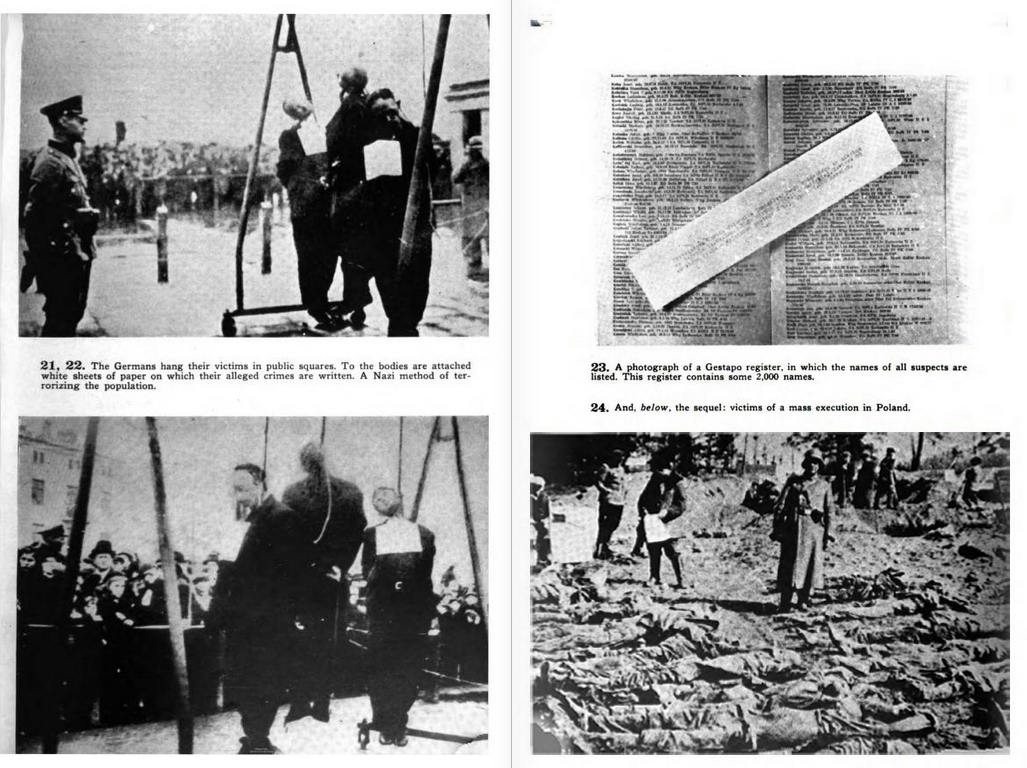
Photos from The Black Book of Poland, published in 1942 by Polish government-in-exile in London and New York

- Gemlich letter, 1919
- Mein Kampf, 1925
- Special Prosecution Book-Poland, 1937–1939
- Ringelblum Archive, 1939–1943
- Heydrich's Instructions to the Chiefs of the Einsatzgruppen, 21 September 1939
- The Black Book, 1940
- Commisar Order, 6 June 1941
- Goring's Commission to Heydrich, July 31, 1941
- Reichenau's Memo on the Conduct of the Troops, 10 October 1941
- Theresienstadt Papers, 1941–44
- Jäger Report, 1941
- The Polish White Book, 1941
- Einsatzgruppen reports, 1941–1942
- An Account of a Forced Gravedigger, January 1942
- Wannsee Conference, 1942
- General Plan Ost, June 1942
- Himmler's Order', 19 July 1942
- Announcement of the Evacuation of the Warsaw Ghetto, 22 July 1942
- Circular Memorandum of Himmler, 9 October 1942
- Grojanowski Report, 1942
- Wilhelm Cornides Report, 1942
- Riegner Telegram, 1942
- Protest!, 1942
- Raczyński's Note, 1942
- The Black Book of Poland, 1942
- The Mass Extermination of Jews in German Occupied Poland, 1942
- Joint Declaration by Members of the United Nations, 1942
- Stroop Report, 1943
- Korherr Report, 1943
- Katzmann Report, 1943
- Höfle Telegram, 1943
- Posen speeches, 1943
- Witold's Report, 1943
- Lodzer Yiskor Book (Memorial Testimony by the survivors of the shtetls in Łódź), 1943
- The Black Book of Polish Jewry, 1943
- Individual & Mass Behavior in Extreme Situations, 1943
- Auschwitz Protocols, 1944
- Vrba–Wetzler report, 1944
- The Polish Major's Report, 1944
- The Black Book of Soviet Jewry, 1944
- Sonderkommando photographs (aka 180-183), August 1944
- Höcker Album, 1944–45
- Gerstein Report, 1945
- Harrison Report, 1945
- Auschwitz Report, written 1945, published 2006
- Nuremberg Trial Transcripts, Documents & Exhibits, 1946–1948

=== Early reports ===
Some of the information relayed in the Grojanowski Report (from the extermination center at Chelmno), including an estimate of 700 thousand murdered Jews, was broadcast by the BBC on June 2, 1942. Mention of several details from this broadcast were recycled and reported on page 5 of the New York Times near the end of that month on June 27, 1942.

A New York Times article reports on the existence and use of the gas-chambers on November 24, 1942. It significantly understates the scale of the mass-killing ongoing in the camps, though it does quote the number killed that year at 250,000 and suggests by implication that operations were continuous or otherwise had not concluded. The article appears on page 10 of that day's edition of the New York Times next to an ad for Seagram's Gin much larger than the article itself. This brief mention broadcasts certain basic elements of the Racynski's note, which was not officially circulated as a brochure under the heading "The Mass Extermination of Jews in German Occupied Poland" until several weeks later.

During the Second World War and in its immediate aftermath, many of the documents listed in the "Primary Documents" section above existed alongside a scattering of reports from individual camps such as Bettleheim's "Individual & Mass-Behavior in Extreme Situations" (1943) which appeared in the Journal of Abnormal Psychology. Early book-length works from survivors of the camps that became widely available immediately after the war include Kogon's Theory and Practice of Hell (1st published in 1946 as Der SS-Staat: Das System de Deutschen Konzentrationslager), and Rousset's Other Kingdom (1946). These come from Dachau. The Nuremberg Trials, with many and various testimonies, were ongoing as Rousset and Kogon were published. A second wave of early first person testimonies at book-length include those by Levi, Wiesel and Adler. These accounts speak of Auschwitz-Birkenau and Thereisenstadt.

The Bettleheim paper appearing in the Journal of Abnormal Psychology is a unique document, insofar as it was published while the concentration camps and extermination centers were still in operation and consisted of the testimony of a working psychiatric clinician in an attempt to report on the circumstances from the perspective of a survivor of the camps. However "Individual & Mass Behavior in Extreme Situations" (1943) also represents the limitations of the early reports: Dachau and Buchenwald (where Bettleheim was imprisoned) were not, technically speaking, extermination centers (the gas-chambers were not used for mass-executions in those camps) and thus does not reflect the experience of prisoners in the death-camps in Eastern Europe but speaks to how the system operated within Germany.

Even reports that record massacres, camps and extermination centers in the East during the war such as Raczyński's Note; the Black Book of Polish Jewry (which confines its sample to Poland, and understates, for a variety of reasons, the full scope of ongoing mass-murder); the Black Book of Soviet Jewry (which was compiled and presented for publication during the war but not circulated until after the war); and the Vrba–Wetzler report (which contains the testimony of two prisoners escaped from Auschwitz-Birkenau, published alongside the testimony of the Jerzy Tabeau, the Polish Major in Auschwitz Protocols) speak only to limited areas within the system of extermination, do not present a full picture of the killing, and were scarcely made available to the larger public due to an editorial policy that questioned the statistics at the time. The Black Book of Soviet Jewry did not circulate during the war, while the Vrba–Wetzler report (April 1944) saw a limited and circumscribed distribution (though it convinced the regent of Hungary to halt transports in June 1944, which had until then been proceeding at a rate of 12,000 deportees per day). The Black Book of Polish Jewry and even earlier reports in the Allied press presented details, but these documents significantly understate the scale of the killings – due in part to limited information, and in part to a (retrospectively) misplaced sense of discretion and sensitivity to the prevailing attitude of antisemitism amongst all Western powers, whether Allied or Axis: there was a desire to make the reports speak to an audience unconcerned about the fate of Jews.

The Lodz Yizkhor Buch was first published in 1943, but remained primarily in Yiddish until a translated edition was published after the war. Many Yizkhor, or community chronicles by survivors, were to follow.

Articles such as the report on atrocities in the May 7th, 1945 issue of Life Magazine (7 May 1945, 31–37) began the process of substantively documenting and revealing aspects of what had happened to the global public whereas before knowledge of the mass-killings and the gas-chambers – though alluded to, for example, in speeches by Churchill (24 August 1941 broadcast, re: 'Appeal to Roosevelt') – and reported by rumor or anecdote, remained hazy and fragmentary in public consciousness. Many of the earliest accounts came from individual camps and the documents listed above – most substantially the Nuremberg Trial documents – but these remained obscure apart from high-level (or generally vague) quotation in journalism.

After the Nuremberg Trials, the first attempt to comprehensively treat the full-sweep of the genocidal program is Hannah Arendt's Origins of Totalitarianism (1951). This is followed by Reitlinger's Final Solution (1953), and the work that was to become the first major historical standard, Raul Hilberg's Destruction of the European Jewry (1961).

=== First histories: early attempts at a comprehensive presentation ===
Early major attempts at systematic scholarship or overviews of the whole system and process of Nazi genocide include:

- Origins of Totalitarianism (1951) by Hannah Arendt
- The Final Solution (1953) by Gerald Reitlinger
- The Destruction of the European Jews (1961) by Raul Hilberg
- Though devoted to an exhaustive history of only one camp, H.G. Adler's book, Theresienstadt 1941–1945. Das Antlitz einer Zwangsgemeinschaft (1955) re: Thereisenstadt: The Face of a Coerced Community also belongs in this collection. This volume thoroughly documents transports to Treblinka and Auschwitz, thus covering activities beyond the perimeter of his camp. As a scrupulously extensive institutional history written by a survivor, it is the only work of its kind.

=== Historical studies ===
- Bauer, Yehuda (2001). Rethinking the Holocaust. Yale University Press. ISBN 0-300-08256-8.
- Bauer, Yehuda (1994). Jews for Sale? Nazi-Jewish Negotiations 1933–1945. Yale University Press. ISBN 0-300-06852-2.
- Berenbaum, Michael (1990). A Mosaic of Victims: Non-Jews Persecuted and Murdered by the Nazis.
- Bergen, Doris (2009). War and Genocide: Concise History of the Holocaust.
- Berkhoff, Karel C. (2004). Harvest of Despair: Life and Death in Ukraine under Nazi Rule. Harvard University Press. ISBN 978-0-674-01313-1.
- Biesold, Horst (1999). Crying Hands: Eugenics and Deaf People In Nazi Germany. Washington, D.C.: Gallaudet University Press. ISBN 1-56368-077-7.
- Black, Edwin (1984). The Transfer Agreement.
- Black, Edwin (2001). IBM and the Holocaust.
- Black, Edwin (2009). Nazi Nexus: America's Corporate Connections to Hitler's Holocaust. Dialog Press. ISBN 978-0-914153-09-2.
- Black, Edwin (2010). The Farhud: The Arab-Nazi Alliance in the Holocaust. Dialog Press. ISBN 978-0-914153-14-6.
- Braham, Randolph (1994) [1981]. The Politics of Genocide: The Holocaust in Hungary. Columbia University Press. ISBN 0-88033-247-6.
- Braham, Randolph (2011). The Auschwitz Reports and the Holocaust in Hungary. Columbia University Press.
- Broszat, Martin (1985). "Hitler and the Genesis of the 'Final Solution': An Assessment of David Irving's Theses". In H. W. Koch (ed.). Aspects of the Third Reich. London: Macmillan. pp. 390–429. ISBN 0-333-35272-6.
- Brossat, Alain & Klingberg, Sylvia. Revolutionary Yiddishland: A History of Jewish Radicalism (1983). trans. David Fernbach. NYC: Verso, 2016.
- Browning, Christopher (2004). The Origins of the Final Solution: The Evolution of Nazi Jewish Policy. University of Nebraska Press. ISBN 978-0-8032-1327-2.
- Browning, Christopher (1992). Ordinary Men: Reserve Police Battalion 101 and the Final Solution in Poland. HarperCollins. ISBN 978-0-06-019013-2.
- Burleigh, Michael; Wippermann, Wolfgang (1985). The Racial State: Germany 1933–1945. Cambridge University Press. ISBN 0-521-39114-8.
- Chalmers, Beverley (2015). Birth, Sex and Abuse: Women's Voices Under Nazi Rule. Grosvenor House Publishing Ltd. ISBN 978-1-78148-353-4.
- Davidowicz, Lucy (1975). The War Against the Jews : 1933–1945.
- Davies, Norman; Lukas, Richard C. (2001) [1996]. Forgotten Holocaust: The Poles Under German Occupation.
- Dean, Martin (2008). Robbing the Jews: The Confiscation of Jewish Property in the Holocaust. Cambridge University Press.
- Dlugoborski, Waclaw; Piper, Franciszek, eds. (2000). Auschwitz 1940–1945: Central Issues in the History of the Camp. Vol. 1–5. Auschwitz-Birkenau State Museum. ISBN 83-85047-87-5.
- Dwork, Deborah; van Pelt, Robert Jan (1996). Auschwitz: 1270 to the Present. W. W. Norton & Company. ISBN 978-0-393-03933-7.
- Dwork, Deborah; van Pelt, Robert Jan (2002). Holocaust: A History. W. W. Norton & Company. ISBN 978-0-393-05188-9.
- Ehrenreich, Eric (2007). The Nazi Ancestral Proof: Genealogy, Racial Science, and the Final Solution. Indiana University Press. ISBN 978-0-253-34945-3.
- Evans, Suzanne (2004). Forgotten Crimes: The Holocaust and People with Disabilities. Ivan R. Dee. ISBN 978-1-56663-565-3.
- Friedländer, Saul (1998). The Years of Persecution: Nazi Germany and the Jews, 1933–1939. Vol. 1.
- Friedländer, Saul (2007). The Years of Extermination: Nazi Germany and the Jews, 1939–1945. Vol. 2. HarperCollins.
- Friedlander, Henry (1995). The Origins of Nazi Genocide: From Euthanasia to the Final Solution.
- Gilbert, Martin (1981). Auschwitz and the Allies. Michael Joseph/Rainbird. ISBN 978-0-7181-2017-7.
- Gilbert, Martin (1985). The Holocaust: A History of the Jews of Europe during the Second World War. Macmillan. ISBN 0-8050-0348-7.
- Gilbert, Martin (2009) [2002]. The Routledge Atlas of the Holocaust, 4th edition. London; New York: Routledge. ISBN 978-0-415-48481-7.
- Goldhagen, Daniel Jonah (1997). Hitler's Willing Executioners: Ordinary Germans and the Holocaust. Vintage.
- Grau, Gunter; Shoppmann, Claudia (1995). The Hidden Holocaust?: Gay and Lesbian Persecution in Germany 1933–45.
- Gutman, Israel; Gutman, Yisrael; Berenbaum, Michael (1994). Anatomy of the Auschwitz Death Camp. Bloomington. ISBN 0-253-32684-2.
- Heberer, Patricia (2011). Children During the Holocaust. Lanham, Md.: AltaMira Press. ISBN 978-0-7591-1984-0.
- Hedgepeth, Sonja; Saidel, Rochelle (2010). Sexual Violence against Jewish Women during the Holocaust.
- Hilberg, Raul (2003) [1961]. The Destruction of the European Jews. Vol. 1–3.
- Hilberg, Raul (1992). Perpetrators, Victims, Bystanders: The Jewish Catastrophe 1933–1945. Aaron Asher Books. ISBN 978-0-06-019035-4.
- Kaufman, Max. Khurbn Letland or The Destruction of Jews in Latvia (1947) Hartung Gorre-Verlag ISBN 978-3-86628-315-2
- Kay, A. J. (2021). Empire of Destruction: A History of Nazi Mass Killing. Yale University Press.
- Klempner, Mark (2006). The Heart Has Reasons: Holocaust Rescuers and Their Stories of Courage. The Pilgrim Press. ISBN 0-8298-1699-2.
- Lewy, Gunter (2000). The Nazi Persecution of the Gypsies. New York: Oxford University Press. ISBN 0-19-512556-8.
- Longerich, Peter (2010). Holocaust: The Nazi Persecution and Murder of the Jews. Oxford: University Press. ISBN 978-0-19-280436-5.
- Lusane, Clarence (2002). Hitler's Black Victims: The Historical Experience of Afro-Germans, European Blacks, Africans and African Americans in the Nazi Era.
- Dalia, Ofer; Weitzman, Lenore (1998). Women in the Holocaust. New Haven: Yale University Press. ISBN 0-300-07354-2.
- Peukert, Detlev (1994). "The Genesis of the 'Final Solution' from the Spirit of Science". In Thomas Childers; Jane Caplan (eds.). Reevaluating the Third Reich. New York: Holmes & Meier. pp. 234–252. ISBN 0-8419-1178-9.
- Plant, Richard (1986). The Pink Triangle: The Nazi War Against Homosexuals. New York: Henry Holt.
- Poliakov, Léon (1979) [1954]. Harvest of Hate: The Nazi Program for the Destruction of the Jews of Europe. New York: Schocken Books. ISBN 0-89604-006-2.
- Pringle, Heather (2006). The Master Plan: Himmler's Scholars and the Holocaust. London: Fourth Estate. ISBN 978-0-7868-6886-5.
- Ioanid, Radu (2001). The Holocaust in Romania: The Destruction of Jews and Gypsies Under the Antonescu Regime, 1940–1944. Ivan R. Dee. ISBN 978-1-56663-256-0.
- Rees, Laurence (2017). The Holocaust: A New History. London: Viking Press. ISBN 978-1-61039-844-2.
- Reitlinger, Gerald (1987) [1953]. The Final Solution: The Attempt to Exterminate the Jews of Europe, 1939–1945. Northvale, N.J.; London: Jason Aronson. ISBN 978-0-87668-951-6.
- Rhodes, Richard (2002). Masters of Death: The SS-Einsatzgruppen and the Invention of the Holocaust. New York: Alfred A. Knopf. ISBN 978-0-375-40900-4.
- Satloff, Robert (2006). Among the Righteous: Lost Stories from the Holocaust's Long Reach into Arab Lands. Public Affairs. ISBN 978-1-58648-510-8.
- Rossel, Seymour (1992). The Holocaust: The World and the Jews, 1933–1945. Behrman House. ISBN 978-0-87441-526-1.
- Schleunes, Karl A. (1970). The Twisted Road to Auschwitz: Nazi Policy Toward German Jews. University of Illinois Press. ISBN 978-0-252-00092-8.
- Snyder, Timothy (2010). Bloodlands: Europe Between Hitler and Stalin. London: The Bodley Head. ISBN 978-0-224-08141-2.
- Snyder, Timothy (2015). Black Earth: The Holocaust as History & Warning. Crown (Reprint), 2015. ISBN 978-1-101-90347-6
- Stone, Dan, ed. (2004). The Historiography of the Holocaust. New York: Palgrave.
- United States Holocaust Memorial Museum (1996). Historical Atlas of the Holocaust. MacMillan. ISBN 978-0-02-897451-4.
- Wachsman, Nikolaus (2015). KL: A History of the Concentration Camps.
- Wilkes, Helen Waldstein (2009). Letters from the Lost: A Memoir of Discovery.
- Yahil, Leni (1990). The Holocaust: The Fate of European Jewry, 1932–1945. Oxford and New York: Oxford University Press.

=== Selected accounts by survivors ===
- Adler, H.G. Theresienstadt 1941–1945. Das Antlitz einer Zwangsgemeinschaft (1955)
- Améry, Jean (1980). At the Mind's Limits: Contemplations by a Survivor on Auschwitz and its Realities.
- Beck, Gad (1999). An Underground Life: Memoirs of a Gay Jew in Nazi Berlin. Univ of Wisconsin Press. ISBN 978-0-299-16504-8.
- Bettelheim, Bruno (1943) "Individual and Mass Behavior in Extreme Situations", Journal of Abnormal and Social Psychology, 38: 417–452
- Blitz Konig, Nanette (2018). Holocaust Memoirs of a Bergen-Belsen Survivor and Classmate of Anne Frank. Amsterdam Publishers. ISBN 978-94-92371-61-4.
- Buber-Neumann, Margarete (1949). Under Two Dictators: Prisoner of Stalin and Hitler. London: Victor Gollancz.
- Delbo, Charlotte (1995). Auschwitz and After. Yale University Press. ISBN 978-0-300-06208-3.
- Dittman, Anita (2005). Trapped in Hitler's Hell. Lighthouse Trails Pub. ISBN 0-9721512-8-1.
- Dunn, Krista Perry (2006). The Courtship of Julian and Frieda: A True Story. Xlibris. ISBN 1-4134-8641-X.
- Frankl, Viktor E. (1997) [1946]. Man's Search for Meaning.
- Gerrard, Mady (2008). Full Circle. KLPM. ISBN 978-0-9558650-0-8.
- Gutman, Israel (1994). Resistance: The Warsaw Ghetto Uprising. Houghton Mifflin. ISBN 0-395-60199-1.
- Gradowski, Zalman (1943). From the Heart of Hell: A Diary of Auschwitz. Zalman was murdered in Auschwitz, but his diary survived buried next to a cresmstorium.
- Heger, Heinz (1994). Men With the Pink Triangle: The True, Life-And-Death Story of Homosexuals in the Nazi Death Camps. Alyson Publications. ISBN 978-1-55583-006-9.
- Kertész, Imre (1975). Fatelessness.
- Klemperer, Victor (1998). I Will Bear Witness: A Diary of the Nazi Years 1933–1941. Random House. ISBN 0-679-45696-1.
- Klemperer, Victor (1998). I Will Bear Witness: A Diary of the Nazi Years 1942–1945. Random House. ISBN 978-0-375-50240-8.
- Klüger, Ruth (1992). Still Alive: A Holocaust Girlhood Remembered. Eine Jugend.
- Kogon, Eugen (1974). Der SS-Staat. Das System der deutschen Konzentrationslager (in German).
- Kovály, Heda Margolius (1985). Under a Cruel Star.
- Lambert, Raymond-Raoul [in French] (1985). Cohen, Richard I. (ed.). Carnet d'un témoin: 1940–1943 (in French). Fayard. ISBN 978-2-213-01549-1.

- Lambert, Raymond-Raoul [in French] (2007). Cohen, Richard I. (ed.). Diary of a witness 1940–1943: The experience of French Jews in The Holocaust. Translated by Best, Isabel. Ivan R. Dee. ISBN 978-1-56663-740-4.

- Lengyel, Olga (2003) [1947]. Five Chimneys: The Story of Auschwitz. Chicago, Ill.: Academy Chicago Publishers. ISBN 978-0-89733-376-4.
- Levi, Primo (1995). If This Is a Man.
- Levi, Primo (1995). The Truce.
- Levi, Primo (1985). The Drowned and the Saved.
- Lusseyran, Jacques (1998). And There Was Light: Autobiography of Jacques Lusseyran, Blind Hero of the French Resistance. Parabola Books. ISBN 978-0-930407-40-7.
- Müller, Filip (1999) [1979]. Eyewitness Auschwitz: Three Years in the Gas Chambers at Auschwitz. Ivan R. Dee. ISBN 978-1-56663-271-3.
- Nomberg-Przytyk, Sara (1985). Auschwitz: True Tales from a Grotesque Land. University of North Carolina Press. ISBN 978-0-8078-1629-5.
- Nyiszli, Miklós (1993) [1960]. Auschwitz: A Doctor's Eyewitness Account. New York: Arcade Publishing. ISBN 1-55970-202-8.
- Orenstein, Henry (1987). I Shall Live: Surviving Against All Odds, 1939–1945. Beaufort Books. ISBN 0-8253-0441-5.
- Rekhtman, Moyshe (2008). Here My Home Once Stood. Lulu.com. ISBN 978-0-615-21703-1.
- Rittner, Carol; Roth, John K. (1998). Different Voices: Women and the Holocaust.
- Seel, Pierre (1995). I, Pierre Seel, Deported Homosexual: Memoir of Nazi Terror. Basic Books. ISBN 978-0-465-04500-6.
- Stojka, Ceija (1988). We Live in Seclusion: The Memories of a Romni.
- Smith, Lyn (2005). Forgotten Voices of the Holocaust. Ebury Press. ISBN 978-0-09-189826-7.
- Steinberg, Manny (2014). Outcry: Holocaust Memoirs. Amsterdam Publishers. ISBN 978-90-821031-3-7.
- Vrba, Rudolf (1964) [1963]. I Cannot Forgive. Grove Press. Also published as: Factory of Death; Escape from Auschwitz: I Cannot Forgive; 44070: The Conspiracy of the Twentieth Century; I Escaped from Auschwitz
- Klein, Gerda Weissmann (1995). All But My Life.
- Wiesenthal, Simon (1997). The Sunflower: On the Possibilities and Limits of Forgiveness.
- Wetzler, Alfréd (2007). Escape from Hell: The True Story of the Auschwitz Protocol. Berghahn Books.
- Winter, Walter (2004). Winter Time: Memoirs of a German Sinto who Survived Auschwitz.
- Zuckerman, Yitzhak (1993). A Surplus of Memory: Chronicle of the Warsaw Ghetto Uprising. University of California Press. ISBN 978-0-520-07841-3.

=== Selected semi-autobiographical accounts by survivors ===
- Berger, Zdena (1961). Tell Me Another Morning. Harper & Brothers. ISBN 978-1-930464-10-0
- Borowski, Tadeusz (1967). This Way for the Gas, Ladies and Gentlemen.
- Fink, Ida (1995) [1987]. Scrap of Time and Other Stories. Evanston, Ill.: Northwestern University Press. ISBN 0-8101-1259-0.
- Spiegelman, Art (1986). Maus: A Survivor's Tale. Volume 1: My Father Bleeds History; Volume 2: Here My Troubles Began.
- Weil, Jiří (1998) [1964]. Life With a Star. Northwestern University Press. ISBN 978-0-8101-1685-6.
- Wiesel, Elie (1960). Night. Hill & Wang.
- Greenfield, Hana (1998). Fragments of Memory. Gefen Publishing House. ISBN 978-965-229-185-1.

=== Other documents ===
- Arad, Yitzhak (1987). Treblinka: The Operation Reinhard Death Camps. Indiana University Press. ISBN 978-0-253-34293-5.
- Carr, Firpo Wycoff (2012) [2003]. Germany's Black Holocaust, 1890–1945. Baltimore: Afrikan World Books. ISBN 978-1-4775-9918-1.
- Czech, Danuta (1999). Auschwitz Chronicle: 1939–1945.
- Dean, Martin (1999). Collaboration in the Holocaust: Crimes of the Local Police in Belorussia and Ukraine.
- Dippler, Christoph (1984). "The German Resistance and the Jews". Yad Vashem Studies. 16: 51–93.
- Dobroszycki, Lucjan, ed. (1984). The Chronicle of the Lodz Ghetto, 1941–1944.
- Gilbert, Martin (1987). Holocaust: A History of the Jews of Europe During the Second World War. Holt, Rinehart, and Winston. ISBN 978-0-03-062416-2.
- Fings, Karola; Kenrick, Donald, eds. (1999). The Gypsies During the Second World War.
- Hogan, David J.; Aretha, David, eds. (2000). The Holocaust Chronicle: A History in Words and Pictures. Lincolnwood, IL: Publications International.
- Kaplan, Vivian Jeanette (2004). Ten Green Bottles: Nazi Occupied Vienna to Shanghair. Macmillan. ISBN 978-0-312-33054-5.
- Katz ST (1999). Gutman Y, Arad Y, Margaliot A (eds.). Documents on the Holocaust: Selected Sources on the Destruction of the Jews of Germany and Austria, Poland, and the Soviet Union. University of Nebraska Press. ISBN 978-0-8032-5937-9.
- Koren, Yehuda; Negev, Eliat (2005). In Our Hearts We Were Giants: The Remarkable Story of the Lilliput Troupe – A Dwarf Family's Survival of the Holocaust.
- Oppenheimer, Deborah; Harris, Mark Jonathan, eds. (2000). Into the Arms of Strangers: Stories of the Kindertransport. New York: Bloomsbury. ISBN 978-1-58234-162-0.
- Pressac, Jean-Claude (1989). Auschwitz: Technique and operation of the gas chambers.
- Pelt, Robert Jan van (2002). The Case for Auschwitz: Evidence from the Irving Trial. Indiana University Press. ISBN 978-0-253-34016-0.
- Vromen, Suzanne (2008). Hidden Children of the Holocaust: Belgian Nuns and their Daring Rescue of Young Jews from the Nazis. Oxford; New York: Oxford University Press.

=== Hypotheses and historiography ===
- Agamben, Giorgio (1999). Remnants of Auschwitz: The Witness and the Archive.
- Bloxham, Donald (2009). The Final Solution: A Genocide.
- Arendt, Hannah (1963). Eichmann in Jerusalem: A Report on the Banality of Evil.
- Cherry R (1999). "Holocaust Historiography: The Role of the Cold War". Science & Society. 63 (4): 459–477. doi:10.1177/003682379906300404. JSTOR 40403812.
- Cole, Tim (1999). Selling the Holocaust. New York: Routledge. ISBN 0-415-92581-9.
- Dippel, John V. H. (1996). Bound Upon a Wheel of Fire: Why So Many German Jews Made the Tragic Decision to Remain in Nazi Germany. Basic Books. ISBN 978-0-465-09103-4.
- Feig, Konnilyn (1981) [1979]. Hitler's Death Camps: The Sanity of Madness. New York; London: Holmes & Meier.
- Finkelstein, Norman G.; Birn, Ruth Bettina (1998). A Nation on Trial: The Goldhagen Thesis and Historical Truth.
- Kershaw, Ian (1985). The Nazi Dictatorship: Problems and Perspectives of Interpretation. London: Hodder Arnold. ISBN 978-0-7131-6408-4.
- Lawson, Tom (2010). Debates on the Holocaust. University of Manchester Press.
- Leff, Laurel (2005). Buried By The Times: The Holocaust And America's Most Important Newspaper. Cambridge University Press. ISBN 0-521-81287-9.
- Linden, R. Ruth (1995) [1995]. Making Stories, Making Selves: Feminist Reflections on the Holocaust. Columbus: Ohio State University Press.
- Lipstadt, Deborah (1994). Denying the Holocaust: The Growing Assault on Truth and Memory. Free Press. ISBN 978-0-02-919235-1.
- Marrus, Michael (2000) [1987]. The Holocaust in History. Toronto: Key Porter Books. ISBN 978-1-55263-120-1.
- Mason, Timothy. "Intention and Explanation: A Current Controversy about the Interpretation of National Socialism". In Marrus, Michael R. (ed.). The Nazi Holocaust Part 3, The "Final Solution": The Implementation of Mass Murder. Vol. 1. Westpoint, CT: Mecler. pp. 3–20.
- Niewyk, Donald L. (1992). Holocaust: Problems & Perspective of Interpretation.
- Novick, Peter (1999). The Holocaust in American Life. Houghton Mifflin. ISBN 978-0-395-84009-2.
- Rosenbaum, Alan S., ed. (2001) [1996]. Is the Holocaust Unique?: Perspectives on Comparative Genocide. Westview Press. ISBN 978-0-8133-3686-2.
- Shepherd, Ben (2016). Hitler's Soldiers: The German Army in the Third Reich. New Haven London: Yale University Press. ISBN 978-0-300-17903-3.
- Troncoso, Sergio (2003). The Nature of Truth.
- Weiss, John (1997). Ideology of Death: Why the Holocaust Happened in Germany.
- Wolffsohn, Michael (1993). Eternal Guilt?: Forty years of German-Jewish-Israeli Relations. New York: Columbia University Press. ISBN 0-231-08274-6.

Holocaust Denialism & Refutation

In a 1989 publication, Abraham Foxman, the national director of the Anti-Defamation League (ADL) from 1987 to 2015, estimated that there were 200 books denying the Holocaust. Major exemplars of Holocaust denialism include productions by Robert Faurisson, David Irving, Wolfgang Hanel, ZFI (Zeitgeschichtliche Forschungsstelle Ingolstadt), and various other pseudo-historians and pseudo-historical societies of a decidedly Neo-Nazi character. For a sketch of these activities and vandalisms of the historical record, see for example the case of David Irving v. Penguin Limited & Deborah Lipstadt.

A work by Jacques Derrida – The Differend (1983) – examines the structural and metaphysical fallacies and double-binds exploited by authors of Holocaust denialism in their negationist arguments.

== Selected filmography ==
Documentaries

- America and the Holocaust The American Experience. 1994, 2005 WGBH Educational Foundation, ISBN 1-59375-235-0
- Auschwitz: The Nazis and 'The Final Solution', BBC. 2005.
- Daring to Resist: Three Women Face the Holocaust is a 57-minute documentary from 1999 which tells the stories of three Jewish teenagers who resisted the Nazis: Faye Schulman, a photographer and partisan fighter in the forests of Poland (now Belarus); Barbara Rodbell, a ballerina in Amsterdam who delivered underground newspapers and secured food and transportation for Jews in hiding; and Shulamit Lack, who acquired false papers and a safe house for Jews attempting to escape from Hungary. The movie was produced and directed by Barbara Attie and Martha Goell Lubell, and narrated by Janeane Garofalo.
- Genocide (1981 film) documents the history of the Holocaust and won the Academy Award for Best Documentary Feature.
- Into the Arms of Strangers: Stories of the Kindertransport
- Liebe Perla is a 53-minute documentary that documents Nazi Germany's brutality towards disabled people through the exploration of a friendship between two women with dwarfism: Hannelore Witkofski of Germany and Perla Ovitz, who at the time of filming was living in Israel. Perla Ovitz was experimented on by Joseph Mengele during the Nazi regime. The film was made by Shahar Rozen in Israel and Germany in 1999, and it is in German and Hebrew with English subtitles.
- Memory of the Camps, as shown by PBS Frontline
- Night and Fog, 1955, directed by Alain Resnais, narrated by Michel Bouquet.
- One Survivor Remembers is a 1995 Oscar-winning documentary (40 minutes) in which Holocaust survivor Gerda Weissmann Klein describes her six-year ordeal as a victim of Nazi cruelty.
- Paper clips
- Paragraph 175 is an 81-minute documentary directed by Rob Epstein and Jeffrey Friedman that discusses the plight of gays and lesbians during the Nazi regime using interviews with all of the known gay and lesbian survivors of this era, five gay men and one lesbian.
- Shoah is a nine-hour documentary completed by Claude Lanzmann in 1985. The film, unlike most historical documentaries, does not feature reenactments or historical photos; instead it consists of interviews with people who were involved in various ways in the Holocaust, and visits to different places they discuss.
- The Sorrow and the Pity, 1972, directed by Marcel Ophüls.
- Swimming in Auschwitz is a 2007 documentary which interweaves the stories of six Jewish women who were imprisoned inside the Auschwitz-Birkenau concentration camp during the Holocaust. The women all survived and tell their stories in person in the documentary; at the time of its filming they were all living in Los Angeles.

Cinema

- Schindler's List (1993)
- Come and See (1985)
- Conspiracy (2001)
- Zone of Interest (2023)

== Other ==
- Interviews from the Underground: Eyewitness accounts of Russia's Jewish resistance during World War II, a documentary film and website.
- Post Holocaust Research Study focusing on Third Generation Holocaust Survivors
- Reich, Tova (2007). My Holocaust. HarperCollins. ISBN 978-0-06-117345-5.
- Album Reveals Behind-Scenes Activities at Auschwitz
- Auschwitz through the lens of the SS: Photos of Nazi leadership at the camp
- 'You Have a Mother' (Jan. 2015), describing Holocaust survivor Lola Mozes' experiences as a child in Nazi camps. By Chris Hedges in Truthdig. The Ghetto (June 2016), Hedges interviews Lola Mozes as she recounts her experience living in Nazi-occupied Poland, three-part video interview, The Real News
- Writing as Resistance (July 2015), describing the writings of inhabitants of the Warsaw Ghetto who buried their accounts of the ghetto (in the hope it would be unearthed later) as German forces were liquidating the Jewish population of the ghetto. By Chris Hedges in Truthdig
- A Liberator, But Never Free (May 2015). "A US Army doctor helped free the Dachau concentration camp in 1945, meticulously documenting his experiences in letters home to his wife. Hidden for the remainder of his life, the letters have resurfaced, and with them, questions about the G.I.'s we know only as heroes." The New Republic
- Máximo, João Carlos (2015), "Não Há Aves em Sobibor", Chiado Editora. ISBN 978-989-51-2276-9.
- Dispossession: Plundering German Jewry, 1933-1953, Jonathan Zatlin and Christoph Kreutzmüller, University of Michigan Press, ISBN 978-0472132034

== See also ==
- Bibliography of genocide studies
- Bibliography of Nazi Germany
- Bibliography of World War II
- Holocaust diarists
- Holocaust studies
- List of Holocaust films
- The Holocaust in popular culture
- World War II in popular culture
