= Liselotte Marshall =

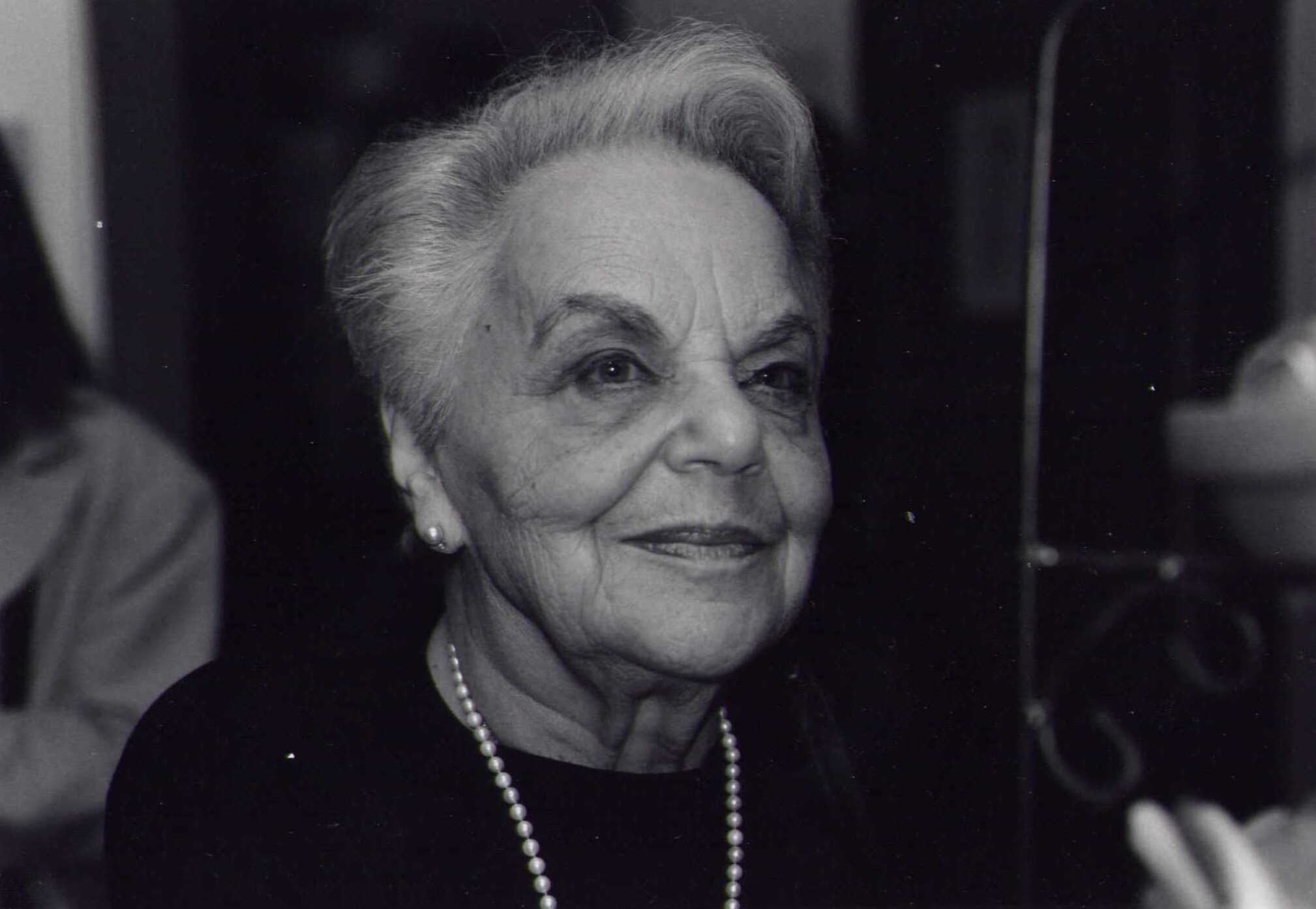
- Marshall in 1998
- Born: 15 September 1923; Giessen, Germany
- Died: 24 May 2017 (aged 93); London, England
- Education: BA, Hunter College MA, Yale University

Liselotte Marshall (née Rosenberg; 15 September 1923 – 24 May 2017) was a German-born Jewish writer known for her novel, Tongue-Tied. It highlights the intersections of antisemitism and ableism in World War II era Switzerland.

== Biography ==
Liselotte Rosenberg was born in Giessen, Germany, on 15 September 1923 to Clara and Siegfried Rosenberg a couple of Jewish apple wine producers and merchants who lived and worked in the nearby town of Usingen. As an infant she contracted bone tuberculosis and at the age of 3 her family sent her to a sanatorium in the French-speaking village of Leysin in the Swiss Alps, where Auguste Rollier had developed a therapy based on sunlight treatment. After Liselotte's family became unable to pay for her medical expenses in Switzerland due to restrictions on Jews being able to transfer funds abroad, Dr Rollier allowed for her to remain in the sanatorium. After her recovery she worked there as a nursing assistant before moving in 1945 to Zurich to train as a social worker.

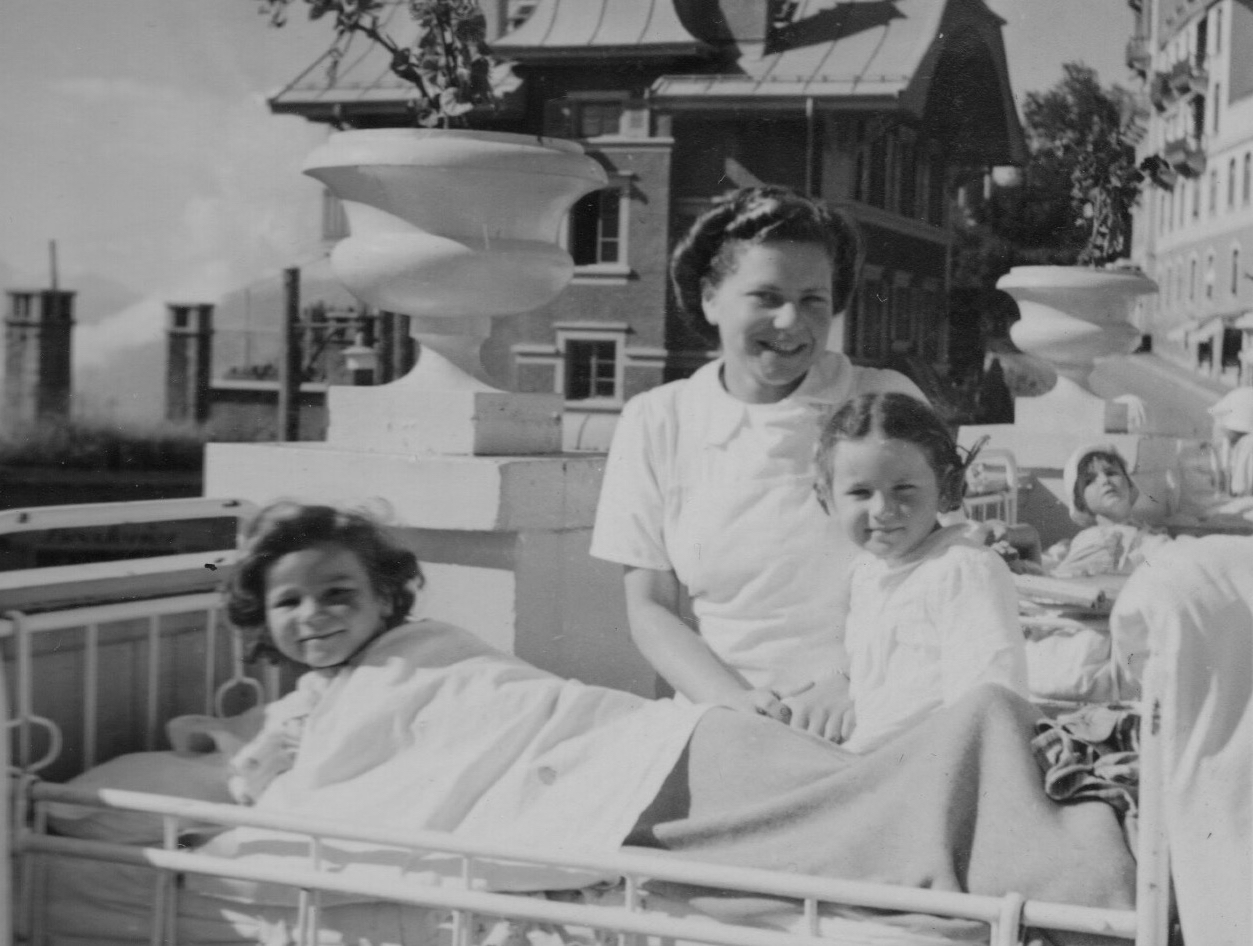
Liselotte Rosenberg (centre) working as a nursing assistant in Leysin, c. 1940.

When Liselotte last visited her parents in Usingen in 1937, she became aware that Nazism had a strong following in the area after suffering anti-Semitic abuse. She was sent back to Switzerland and soon after her parents fled to Frankfurt, Germany before taking refuge in the United States in 1941. Liselotte remained in Switzerland until she joined her family in the United States in 1946.

Switzerland held a profound importance in her life and became the setting for her novel Tongue-Tied.

In New York she attended Hunter College. In the immediate post-war years, the college waived many of the normal entry requirements and attracted a large number of European refugees who had missed out on formal education. It was there that she first met Ruth Klüger, a Holocaust survivor whose memoir Still Alive discusses Hunter and the start of what would be her lifelong friendship with Liselotte. After graduating, she earned a master's degree in comparative literature from Yale. While at Yale, she met her future husband Peter Marshall, a British history doctoral student.

Peter and Liselotte moved to England in 1953, married, and had two children Eleanor and Oliver in Bristol where Peter worked at the university.

The family moved often; from Bristol to California and back to Montreal, and finally to Manchester. When her husband Peter retired, they moved to Whaley Bridge (in Derbyshire), and finally to London.

Among other things, Liselotte felt comfortable with her official status of being stateless since she disliked the idea of nationality. Her husband Peter died in 2008, Liselotte lived for 9 more years until her death in 2017. She was survived by her children Eleanor and Oliver, and her grandchildren Jessica, Sam, Anneliese, and George.

== Tongue-Tied ==
Highlighting the intersections of antisemitism and ableism, Tongue-Tied is a novel written by Liselotte Marshall about a New York-based interpreter, Rachel. Upon losing her ability to speak, Rachel is overcome by a past of painful memories that contributes to the breakdown of her marriage and a series of reflections on her family and upbringing as a stateless person. The themes of the novel highlight Marshall's own experiences as a refugee in Switzerland where she battled bone tuberculosis and struggled against her experiences with antisemitism. Marshall began drafting the novel in 1970 in English, but she took a hiatus due to the intensity of emotions she experienced while writing. She finished Tongue-Tied in 1991. However, the novel was originally published in German in 1997, followed by French in 2000, and then in 2004 in English, its original language.

Marshall said of Tongue-Tied that she hoped to erase the pain of her childhood. She wanted to tell her story, and highlight a child's life in a sanatorium in Leysin. On why Marshall chose to write a novel, she states that a novel allowed her to express things she would not feel safe expressing in an autobiography. She feared backlash for her critical portrayal of Swiss society in the 1930s and 1940s.
