= Encyclopedia of the Holocaust =

Encyclopedia of the Holocaust published by Yad Vashem

The Encyclopedia of the Holocaust (1990) has been described as "the most recognized reference book on the Holocaust". It was published in an English-language translated edition by Macmillan in tandem with the Hebrew-language original edition published by Yad Vashem (יד ושם), the Holocaust Remembrance Authority in Israel.

All of its contributors are reputable Holocaust scholars and academics. While the encyclopedia is accessible, easy to navigate, and contains no graphic images, it is not recommended for readers below high school age due to the seriousness and complexity of its subject matter.

The Encyclopedia was the winner of the 1991 American Library Association’s Dartmouth Medal.

== Features ==
- Basic introductory overview of the Holocaust written by Elie Wiesel.
- Glossary
- Chronology
- Maps, illustrations, photographs
- Persons of interest
- Places of interest (including concentration camps, ghettos, murder sites)
- Political movements and resistance movements.
- Major Jewish organizations in Germany 1893-1943
- Structure of the einsatzgruppen
- Nuremberg Trial results
- Subsequent Nuremberg proceedings
- Subsequent British trial results
- Estimated Jewish losses in the Holocaust

== International Editorial Board ==
Editor-in-chief:

- Israel Gutman, Yad Vashem; Hebrew University of Jerusalem.

The other editors:

- Yitzhak Arad, Yad Vashem, Jerusalem
- Yehuda Bauer, Hebrew University of Jerusalem
- Randolph L. Braham, City University of New York
- Martin Broszat (1926–1989), LMU Munich
- Christopher R. Browning, University of North Carolina
- Richard I. (Yerachmiel) Cohen, Hebrew University of Jerusalem
- Henry L. Feingold, City University of New York
- Saul Friedländer, Tel Aviv University
- Martin Gilbert, University of London
- Andreas Hillgruber (1925–1989), University of Cologne
- Eberhard Jäckel, University of Stuttgart
- Steven Katz, Boston University, USA
- Shmuel Krakowski, Yad Vashem, Jerusalem
- Otto Dov Kulka, Hebrew University of Jerusalem
- Dov Levin, Hebrew University of Jerusalem
- Czesław Madajczyk, Polish Academy of Sciences, Warsaw
- Michael Marrus, University of Toronto
- György Ránki, Hungarian Academy of Sciences, Budapest
- Jehuda Reinharz, Brandeis University, USA
- Shmuel Spector, Yad Vashem, Jerusalem
- Jerzy Tomaszewski, University of Warsaw
- Aharon Weiss, Yad Vashem; University of Haifa
- Leni Yahil, University of Haifa
- Geoffrey Wigoder editor of the English edition.
