= American Federation for Polish Jews =

American Federation for Polish Jews (formerly known as the Federation of Russian-Polish Hebrews or Federation of Polish Jews in America.) was a non-governmental organization founded in 1908 in New York, USA, as the Federation of Russian-Polish Hebrews. Publisher of The Black Book of Polish Jewry in 1943. It was active in the Polish-Jewish-American scene until mid-20th century.
