= The Years of Extermination =

2007 book by Saul Friedländer

The Years of Extermination: Nazi Germany and the Jews, 1939–1945
- Author: Saul Friedländer
- Publisher: HarperCollins
- Publication date: April 10, 2007
- Media type: Hardback
- Pages: 896
- ISBN: 0-06-019043-4
- OCLC: 70660369

The Years of Extermination: Nazi Germany and the Jews, 1939–1945 is the second volume of Saul Friedländer's history of Nazi Germany and the Jews. It describes the German extermination policies that resulted in the murder of six million European Jews. The book presents a detailed history of the Holocaust and is based on a vast array of documents and memoirs. It won the 2007 Leipzig Book Fair Prize for Non-fiction and won the Pulitzer Prize for General Nonfiction in 2008.

Friedländer is an Intentionalist on the origins of the Holocaust question. However, Friedländer rejects the extreme Intentionalist view that Adolf Hitler had a master plan for the genocide of the Jewish people going back to the time when he wrote Mein Kampf. Friedländer, through his research on the Third Reich, has reached the conclusion that there was no intention to exterminate the Jews of Europe before 1941. Friedländer's position might best be deemed moderate Intentionalist.

The first volume is The Years of Persecution: Nazi Germany and the Jews, 1933–1939 (1998).

== Reception ==
Historian Richard J. Evans, writing in The New York Times said that, though written with academic rigor, "what raises The Years of Extermination to the level of literature, however, is the skilled interweaving of individual testimony with the broader depiction of events."

== See also ==
- Blood and Soil (book)
