= Jerzy Tomaszewski (historian) =

Polish political scientist and historian

Jerzy Tomaszewski (October 8, 1930 – November 3, 2014) was a Polish political scientist and historian, born in Radomsko. He graduated from the Warsaw School of Economics and worked there, later moving on to the Warsaw University of Life Science, and finally to Warsaw University. He specialized in the economic history of Poland and the Polish-Jewish history and relations. He authored many books together with his colleague from the Warsaw School of Economics, Zbigniew Landau.

Since 1990, Tomaszewski has been employed in the Department of History at Warsaw University, where he worked on history of Jews in Poland.
