= Here My Home Once Stood =

2008 book by Moyshe Rekhtman with Phil Shpilberg

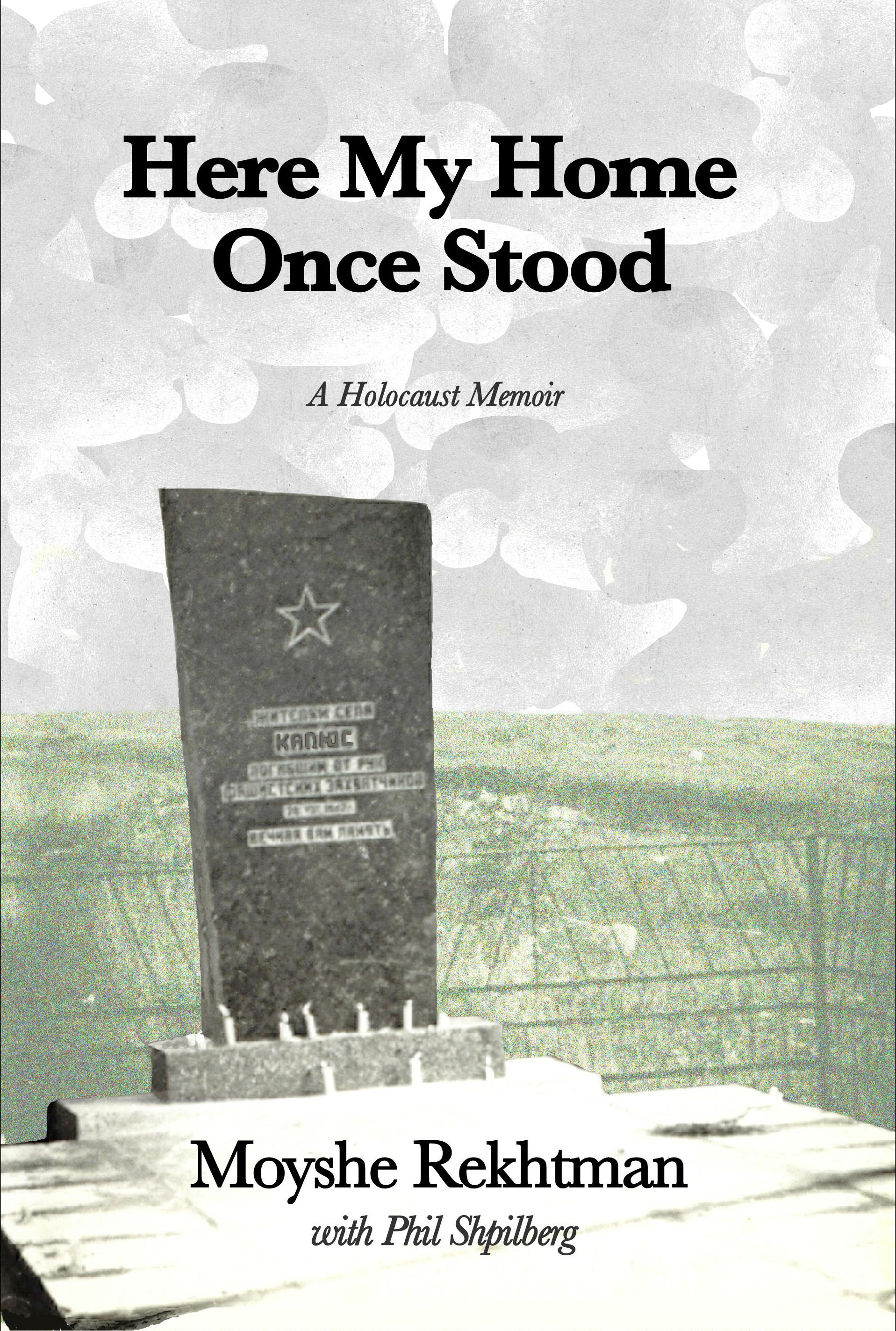
- First edition cover
- Author: Moyshe Rekhtman, Phil Shpilberg
- Language: English
- Subject: Autobiography, Holocaust
- Genre: Autobiographical novel
- Publisher: Fourth Generation Publishing
- Publication date: August 20th, 2008
- Publication place: United States
- Media type: Print (Hardcover)
- Pages: 151 pages (first edition)
- ISBN: 978-0-615-21703-1
- OCLC: 263688037
- Dewey Decimal: 940.53/18092 B 22
- LC Class: DS135.U43 R457 2008

Here My Home Once Stood: A Holocaust Memoir (ISBN 0-615-21703-6) is a 2008 World War II memoir told in Russian by Moyshe Rekhtman and transcribed, translated and written by his grandson Phil Shpilberg.

As a fourteen-year-old Jewish boy who had rarely ventured outside his small, remote village, Moyshe Rekhtman may seem an unlikely escape artist. But his iron will and quick wit allowed him to survive when all seemed lost. Staging escapes from death camps and avoiding Nazi pursuit through the frozen Ukrainian countryside—all while facing the loss of his family, famine, constant threat of capture, torture, and execution—would be a monumental task for the strongest of men. Despite his mild manners, emaciated body, and poor vision, he evaded the death squads in Nazi-occupied Ukraine for four years. Moyshe's Holocaust memoir is a remarkable example of human fortitude during a time when many welcomed an end to their suffering.
