= The Black Book of Polish Jewry =

1943 report on the Holocaust in Poland

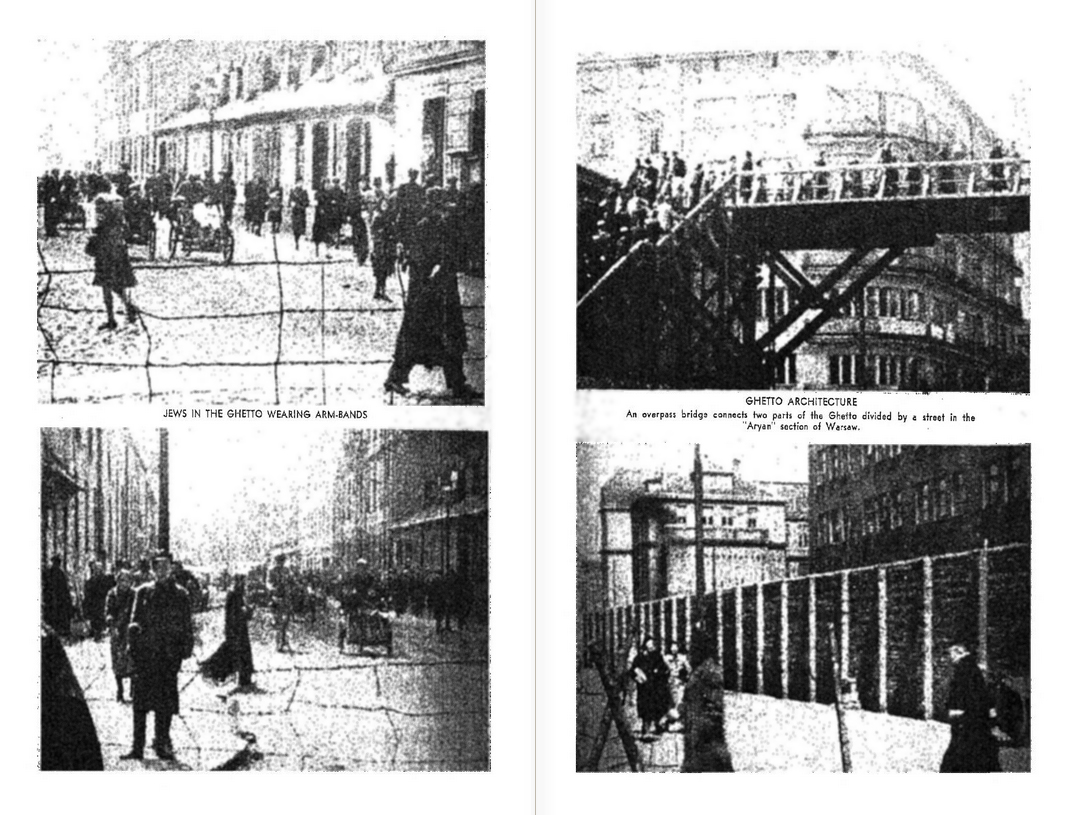
- Plates inserted between pages 128 and 129 illustrating Part One. Chapter 8. Extermination
- Author: Jacob Apenszlak, Jacob Kenner, Isaac Lewin, Moses Polakiewicz
- Published: Roy Publishers, New York
- Publisher: American Federation for Polish Jews in cooperation with the Association of Jewish Refugees and Immigrants from Poland
- Publication date: 1943
- Pages: 400
- OCLC: 1265138

The Black Book of Polish Jewry is a 400-page report about the progress of the Holocaust in Poland published in 1943 during World War II by the American Federation for Polish Jews in cooperation with the Association of Jewish Refugees and Immigrants from Poland. It was compiled by Jacob Apenszlak with Jacob Kenner, Isaac Lewin and Moses Polakiewicz, and released by Roy Publishers of New York with an introduction by Ignacy Schwarzbart from the National Council of the Polish Republic. The book was sponsored by Eleanor Roosevelt, Albert Einstein, US Senator Robert Wagner, and other high-ranking community leaders. Historian Michael Fleming suggests it downplayed the true scale and manner of the Holocaust in an effort to elicit the empathy of its readership. (Note: The editorial policy was to marginalize news of the death camps and focus on the Nazi policies and practices, which had a better chance of resonating with American audiences. Statistics about the number of victims at the death camps were questioned at the time.)

== Contents ==
The Black Book of Polish Jewry is a compendium of information collected and summarized from the plethora of already available sources including The Polish Fortnightly Review series published by the Polish Ministry of Information, the heavily-censored Gazeta Żydowska published in occupied Poland, as well as depositions of refugees who managed to escape from occupied Poland to Palestine via Wilno; articles by Swiss and Swedish correspondents, daily bulletins of the Polish Telegraphic Agency, the Jewish news agencies in Geneva, Hungary, Slovakia and Constantinople, and many others. The 400-page volume is divided into Part One, consisting of 17 chapters devoted to all stages of the mass extermination of Jews during the Final Solution; and Part Two, presenting an overview of the thousand-year-old Jewish community in Poland, in 12 chapters.

The 1943 estimates of how many Jews have died in General Government, are based on data collected while the Holocaust was still in progress, mostly from the preceding year.^{[pp. 200–201]} Notably, the Birkenau killing installations are missing from the book entirely, and only the concentration camps quota from 1942 are partially summarized. Nevertheless, it estimates the loss of over 700,000 Jewish lives directly due to Nazi persecution.

The Report correctly identified Treblinka, Bełżec, and Sobibór, as extermination camps where prisoners were murdered by means of poison gas, but the fate of the Nazi ghetto deportees was not as clearly defined:

About 25,000 Jews were deported from Lublin in sealed railway cars to an unknown destination and all trace of them was lost" [and] "of the 250,000 Jews deported from the Warsaw Ghetto up to September 1, 1942, only two small transports, numbering about 4,000 people, are known to have been sent eastwards in the direction of Brzesc and Malachowicze, allegedly to be employed on work behind the front lines. It was not possible to ascertain whether any of the other Jews deported from the Warsaw Ghetto still survive and it must be feared that they have been all put to death.

The report documented with high accuracy the progress of the Holocaust by bullets in the east as far as localities, but the number of victims was underestimated, with significant percentage of deaths unaccounted for by year's end:

In many places the Jews were deported to an unknown destination and killed in neighboring woods. In Lwow 30,000 Jews were killed in that way, at Stanislawow 15,000, at Tarnopol 5,000, at Zloczow 2,000, at Brzezany 4,000. The same things happened at Zborow, Kolomyja, Sambor, Stryj, Drohobycz, Zbaraz, Przemyslany, Kuty, Sniatyn, Zaleszczyki, Brody, Przemysl, Rawa-Ruska, etc. In Wilno 50,000 Jews were murdered ... all Jews in Zurawicze, Mir, Lachowice, Kosow ... in Slonim ... nearly 9,000 Jews were slaughtered. In Rowno ... nearly 15,000 Jews were shot, men, women and children ... This mass-slaughter of Jew has taken place in all the Polish territories east of the rivers San and Bug.

According to Michael Fleming, neither the editor, Jacob Apenszlak, nor his collaborators, stated the true scale and manner of the Holocaust in Poland, seeking to elicit empathy from an American public which at that time "was marked by a high level of antisemitism". Fleming further wrote that "the fate of Polish Jewry was narrated without, in the most part, reference to the death camps". He attributed those issues to self-censorship and compromises made to satisfy the "US censorship and propaganda organs". The book was sponsored by Eleanor Roosevelt (wife of President Franklin D. Roosevelt), Albert Einstein, Senator Robert Wagner and several prominent Americans, Jews, and Poles including high-ranking officials and community leaders.
