= Israel Gutman =

Israeli historian and Holocaust survivor (1923–2013)

- ישראל גוטמן
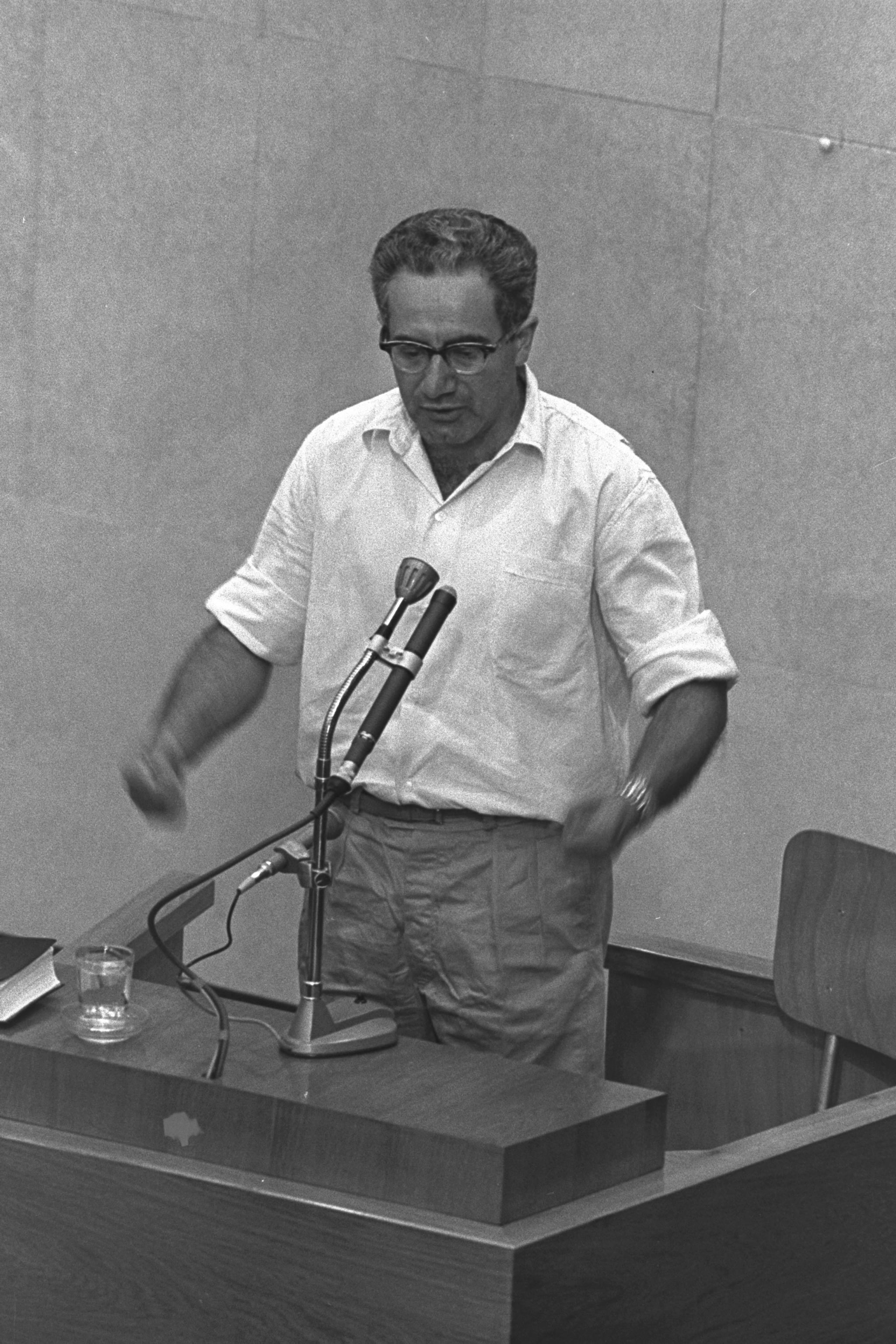
- Israel Gutman at Adolf Eichmann's trial in 1961
- Born: 20 May 1923; Warsaw, Second Polish Republic
- Died: 1 October 2013 (aged 90); Jerusalem, Israel
- Occupation: Historian
- Known for: Holocaust survivor

Israel Gutman (Hebrew: ישראל גוטמן; 20 May 1923 – 1 October 2013) was a Polish-born Israeli historian and a survivor of the Holocaust.

== Biography ==
Israel (Yisrael) Gutman was born in Warsaw, Second Polish Republic. After participating and being wounded in the Warsaw Ghetto Uprising, he was deported to the Majdanek, Auschwitz and Mauthausen concentration camps. His parents and siblings died in the ghetto. In January 1945, he survived the death march from Auschwitz to Mauthausen, where he was liberated by U.S. forces. In the immediate post-war period, he joined the Jewish Brigade in Italy. In 1946, he immigrated to Mandate Palestine and joined Kibbutz Lehavot HaBashan, where he raised a family. He was a member of the kibbutz for 25 years. In 1961, he testified at the trial of Adolf Eichmann.

== Academic career ==
Gutman was a professor of history at the Hebrew University of Jerusalem and deputy chairman of the International Auschwitz Council at Auschwitz-Birkenau Foundation. He was the editor-in-chief of the Encyclopedia of the Holocaust and won the Yitzhak Sadeh Prize for Military Studies. At Yad Vashem, he headed the International Institute for Holocaust Research (1993–1996), served as Chief Historian (1996–2000) and was the Academic Advisor (from 2000). He was also an advisor to the Polish government on Jewish Affairs, Judaism and Holocaust Commemoration.

He died, aged 90, in Jerusalem, Israel.

== Published works ==
- The Jews of Warsaw, 1939-1943: Ghetto, Underground, Revolt (1982)
- Unequal Victims: Poles and Jews in World War Two (1986)
- The Jews of Poland Between Two World Wars (1989)
- Anatomy of Auschwitz Death Camp (with Michael Berenbaum, 1994)
- Resistance: The Warsaw Ghetto Uprising (1994)
- Emanuel Ringelblum – The Man and the Historian (2006)
