= Richard I. Cohen =

Israeli historian

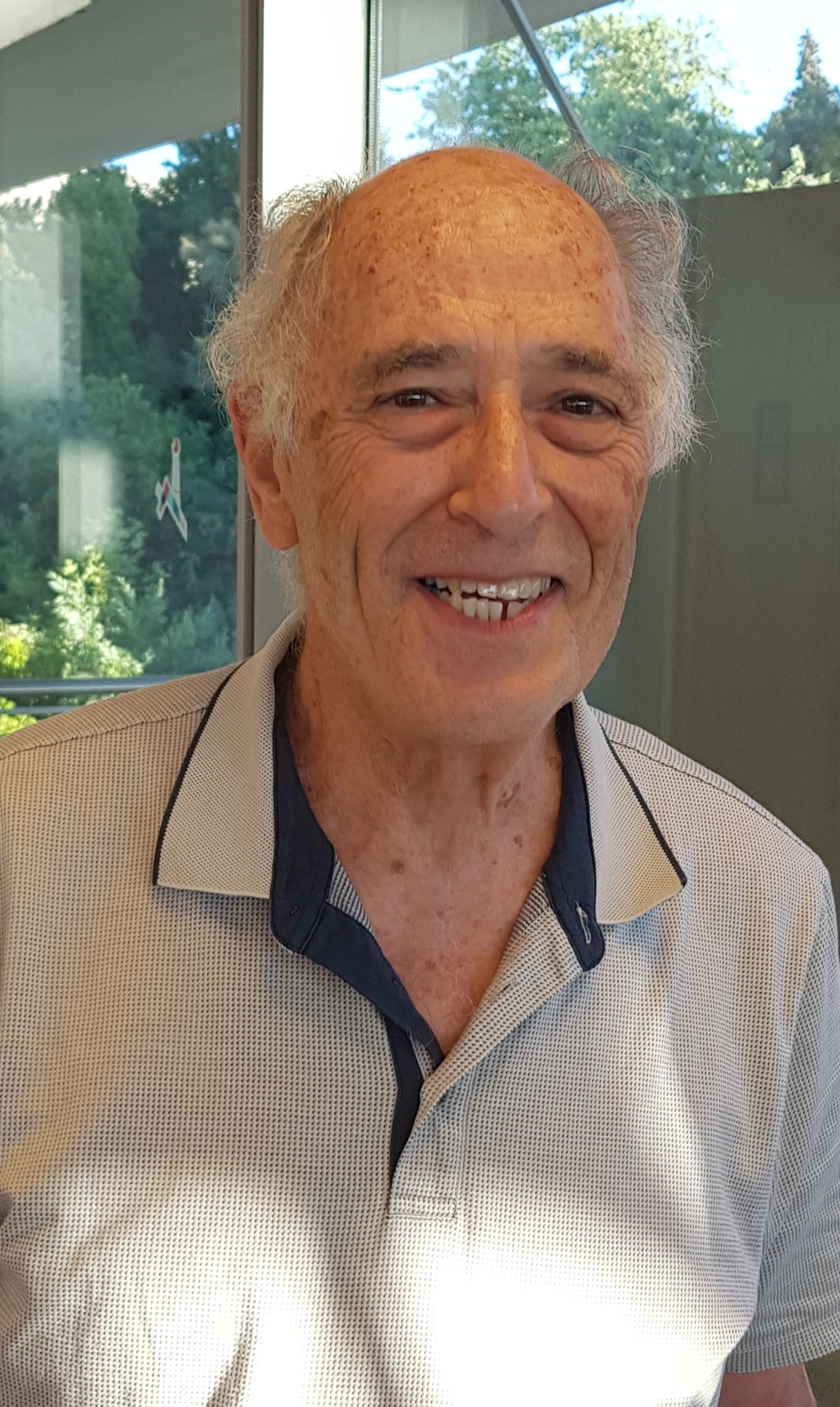
Richard I. Cohen

Richard I. Cohen (Hebrew: ריצ'רד כהן) also known as Richard Yerachmiel Cohen is a professor of history, presently holding the Paulette and Claude Kelman Chair in French Jewry Studies in the Department of Jewish History at the Hebrew University of Jerusalem. He specializes in the history of Jews in Western and Central Europe in the modern period, in particular the Jews of France, art history, Jewish historiography, and The Holocaust.

== Early life ==
Cohen was born in Montréal, Québec, Canada. Cohen completed his undergraduate History and Sociology degree at McGill University in 1967. He earned his master's degree in 1972 and PhD in 1981, both at the Hebrew University of Jerusalem.

== Career ==
Cohen was on the international editorial board of the Encyclopaedia of the Holocaust, published in 1990 in tandem Hebrew- and English-language editions by Yad Vashem.

His 1998 book Jewish Icons: Art and Society in Modern Europe explores art by and about Jews, in the context of European Jewish social history, as well as art history, and encompasses both high art and popular visual culture; he produced this work in the course of a 15-year collaboration with fellow Hebrew University historian Ezra Mendelsohn (1940–2015) in efforts to encourage research on the arts and modern Jewish society.

== Selected bibliography ==
- The Return to the Land of Israel. World Zionist Organization, Dor Hemschech. 1968. ISBN 965-227-035-0. (co-author: Judith Carp)
- The Burden of Conscience: French-Jewish leadership during the Holocaust. Indiana University Press. 1987. ISBN 0-253-31263-9.
- Jewish Icons: Art and society in Modern Europe. University of California Press. 1998. ISBN 0-520-20545-6.
- The Emergence of Jewish Artists in Nineteenth-Century Europe. Merrill. 2001. ISBN 1-85894-153-9. (co-author: Susan Tumarkin Goodman)
- The Jewish Contribution to Civilization: Reassessing an idea. Littman Library of Jewish Civilization. 2008. ISBN 978-1-904113-52-2. (co-author: Jeremy Cohen)
- Lambert, Raymond-Raoul [in French] (1985). Cohen, Richard I. (ed.). Carnet d'un témoin: 1940–1943 (in French). Fayard. ISBN 978-2-213-01549-1.

- Lambert, Raymond-Raoul [in French] (15 October 2007). Cohen, Richard I. (ed.). Diary of a witness 1940-1943: The experience of French Jews in The Holocaust. Translated by Best, Isabel. Ivan R. Dee. ISBN 978-1-56663-740-4.
