= Mark Klempner =

American historian

Mark Klempner (July 11, 1956 – March 3, 2019) was an American folklorist, oral historian and social commentator.

== Early life ==
Klempner grew up in New York City, and attended Cornell University, graduating Phi Beta Kappa in 1997, and winning a J. William Fulbright Fellowship. In 2000, he received an M.A. in folklore from the University of North Carolina at Chapel Hill.

Later in life, he moved to Costa Rica and taught English writing in Blue Valley school.

== The Heart Has Reasons ==
Klempner spent nearly a decade talking with and getting to know Dutch Righteous Among the Nations in order to write The Heart Has Reasons: Holocaust Rescuers and Their Stories of Courage, Cleveland: The Pilgrim Press, 2006. He found the rescuers through Yad Vashem, and was originally funded by a research grant from the Institute for European Studies at Cornell University. Most of the rescuers he interviewed were previously unknown to the general public, with the exception of Miep Gies, who tried to save Anne Frank and her family. Because Klempner is the son of a Jewish immigrant who barely escaped the Holocaust, he found that his subjects sometimes looked at him as the child or grandchild of the Jews they rescued. He later conducted archival research at The United States Holocaust Memorial Museum and The Netherlands Institute for War Documentation. The published book contains a foreword by renowned Holocaust historian Christopher Browning. In Spring of 2012, Klempner addressed members of the United States Congress and their Staffs on the occasion of Holocaust Remembrance Day (Yom HaShoah). He also spoke at the Library of Congress and a webcast is now available containing his speech.

On November 15, 2012, an updated paperback edition of The Heart Has Reasons was published by Night Stand Books with the ISBN 0988567407. The subtitle has changed from "Holocaust Rescuers and Their Stories of Courage" to "Dutch Rescuers of Jewish Children during the Holocaust." The author notes that this second edition contains 12 new photographs, improvements in the text, and an updated epilogue.

== Commentaries ==
Klempner's articles on oral history methodology have appeared internationally in professional journals and anthologies such as The Oral History Reader. He has also been a guest columnist for mainstream periodicals such as the Christian Science Monitor and the Baltimore Sun as well as progressive religious periodicals like the National Catholic Reporter and Tikkun. His op-eds often tackle difficult political and social issues, such as his piece "The Internet: Our Last Hope for a Free Press," which has received more than 1,000 Diggs. He has also been featured as a radio commentator on Morning Edition, and has been interviewed on Air America Radio, NPR, Prime Time Radio and other broadcast media in the United States. He has also been an interviewer, most notably of author Tracy Kidder, who spoke with Klempner about his portrait of Dr. Paul Farmer found in the book Mountains Beyond Mountains. Klempner's articles have appeared on the internet at such sites as Common Dreams, Alternet, The Huffington Post, The Social Edge and Sojo Mail, the weekly newsletter of Jim Wallis' Sojourners community.
