= Tell Me Another Morning =

Autobiographical novel by a Holocaust survivor

- First edition
- Author: Zdena Berger
- Cover artist: Charlotte Salmon
- Language: English
- Subject: Holocaust
- Genre: Autobiographical fiction
- Published: 1961 (Harper & Brothers)
- Publication place: United States
- Media type: Print (hardback, paperback)
- Pages: 243 pages
- ISBN: 193046410X (2007 reissue)

Tell Me Another Morning is an autobiographical novel by Zdena Berger, a survivor of Holocaust camps at Theresienstadt, Auschwitz and Bergen-Belsen. Berger began writing the book in 1955 after coming to North America and in 1961 she published the work through Harper & Brothers. The work went out of print shortly thereafter but was reissued in 2007 through Paris Press. The book depicts the experiences of Tania Andersova, a teenage girl who is taken away to the Nazi concentration camps during the Holocaust.

Tell Me Another Morning was a finalist for the National Jewish Book Award for Women's Studies in 2007.

== Plot ==
The book begins with Tania, a 14-year-old girl living in Prague before the war. Her life is fairly ordinary until her 16th year, when Tania and her family were captured by Nazi guards. Tania and her parents are forced to board a train headed for a Nazi concentration camp. Once there, they are kept in a horrific environment where there was little food or water. Prisoners are worked to death and when they can no longer work, they are slaughtered. Tania manages to befriend Ilsa, a young teen who works in the kitchens and helps supply Tania and her parents with extra food. However, despite this help, the health of Tania's parents suffers which proves problematic when it comes time to move to another camp. Ilsa tries to use lipstick to rouge the cheeks of Tania's mother and enable her to remain with them, only for Tania's mother to choose to remain with her husband, as he has been selected for death as opposed to transfer.

== Reception ==
Comparative literature professor Sidra DeKoven Ezrahi has noted Berger's use of "a first-person narrative ... interspersed with passages which describe the same events objectively, in the manner of a historical chronicle, adding a broader and more detached perspective to the experiences which are otherwise filtered though one center of consciousness."

Upon its reissue, the book received additional praise and Publishers Weekly listed it as a recommended read for college and high school students. Alice Mattison cited the book's characters as a highlight of the read, as they "quarrel, speculate, make jokes, tell stories, and respond to horrors with wry, cynical patience." The Jung Journal gave an extremely glowing review for Tell Me Another Morning and commented that the book was "so poetical and lyrical and the experiences so simply stated that it is like no other book on the Holocaust experience I have ever read." The reviewer for Kliatt noted that "Unfortunately, Tania's story is not unusual, but the spare prose and seeing the world through Tania's eyes will make this book appealing to the YA reader."
