= Still Alive (book) =

2001 memoir by Ruth Klüger

Still Alive: A Holocaust Girlhood Remembered
- Author: Ruth Klüger
- Genre: Memoir/Jewish studies
- Publisher: Feminist Press
- Publication date: 2001
- ISBN: 978-155861436-9
- LC Class: DS135.A93 K58513 2001

Still Alive: A Holocaust Girlhood Remembered (2001) written by Ruth Klüger, is a memoir of her experiences growing up in Nazi-occupied Vienna and later in the concentration camps of Theresienstadt, Auschwitz-Birkenau, and Christianstadt. However, as it's written by Klüger as a 70-year-old woman, the memoir goes beyond her experience as an inmate, chronicling her escape from Christianstadt's death march with her mother and adopted sister, Susi. The narrative ends not only with their self-liberation, or even with the general liberation by Allied forces, but goes beyond to her life as a post-war refugee. She outlines for the reader the difficulties she experienced in migrating to America, as well as the challenges and culture shock she faced as a foreigner trying to obtain an education and a place in society.

Klüger resists narrating her story for the reason that she does not want her audience to derive a moral from the Holocaust as a whole. She defends her view, saying (of her time at Auschwitz), "[y]ou learned nothing there, and least of all humanity and tolerance." This undermining perspective appears often in the form of interjected philosophical asides.

It is difficult to map out a story arc in the memoir because of Klüger's tangential commentary as she recounts the events in her life. She writes chronologically, but often disrupts her narrative with her own internal dialogue, ranging from statements such as "[the camps] weren't good for anything" to pondering the facts of her own story, confessing, "This story moves in circles, and the more of it I tell, the less of it makes sense."

== Family ==
=== Mother ===
A common recurring theme in the memoir is the element of irreconciliation between Klüger and her family members, the foremost presence in her life being that of her mother, since her father and brother were murdered during the Holocaust. Klüger has been criticized for her abrasive tone regarding this relationship. Alma Klüger remained with her daughter throughout the camps, only briefly separated from her in Theresienstadt, when Klüger was in a children's barracks and her mother remained in the adult section of the camp. She recalls how, as a child, she did not trust her mother, and now in retrospect, she is able to fully articulate why this was. Of this she said, "She told me so much nonsense that I ceased to believe anything she told me...she would often slap me or kiss me from sheer nervousness, simply because I was there." Despite her unhappiness, Klüger still credits her mother's paranoia as the reason for her survival. Though she argues that there are "no absolute means of salvation," she writes, "[m]y mother had reacted correctly to the extermination camp from the outset, that is, with the sure instinct of the paranoid...I think that people suffering from compulsive disorders, such as paranoia, had a better chance to pick their way out of mass destruction, because in Auschwitz they were finally in a place where the social order (or social chaos) had caught up with their delusions."

=== Father ===
In the beginning of the memoir, Klüger recalls her inability to balance her memories of her father as a living entity and as a murder victim. She explains that, "[t]here is a gap between knowledge and memory, and I can't bridge it." This internal conflict causes her to search for closure by imagining his murder in a gas chamber, although she does not know what happens to him. In fact, she learns decades later that he was transported to the Baltic states and most likely shot. Klüger finds this difficult to accept, as she has lived with her constructed memory long enough to have come to terms with this end to her father's life. Her hunger for closure manifests itself later in life, when she seeks counseling from her father's friend. She realizes that she is projecting her father's image onto this therapist, which only further disrupts the equilibrium she seeks. In reflection she writes, "[b]asically I wanted my father from [surviving men]: I was looking for men who could somehow stand in for him, a last attempt to resurrect him from a grave he didn't have."

=== Brother ===
Klüger fondly remembers Schorschi, her half-brother from her mother's previous marriage. As a child, they lived together in Vienna, though his father kept him in Czechoslovakia after the war broke out. Klüger reflects on a childhood memory when she asked her mother who she loved best, to which her mother replied, "Schorschi, because I have known him longer." She notes that she still hears her mother speak these words to this day.

== Feminist Observations ==
Klüger distinguishes her memoir by often presenting her readers with a gender-specific narration of her experience. Narratives of the Holocaust, such as Elie Wiesel's Night, generally lack stories of violation on this score, but Klüger deviates from a neutral perspective of the Holocaust by recalling in detail her memories of men victimizing or violating subjugated women during and after the war. For example, before transporting Auschwitz prisoners to Christianstadt, each woman's uterus was inspected for stray items: "there had been a 'gynecological' exam carried out by female prisoners, which was not for or about our health, but served the purpose of discovering whether we hid any precious items in intimate parts of the body." She ties her female-specific experience to a protestation of the barbarity of war in general, and Nazi methods in particular, decrying the unnatural stress that imprisonment can place on a person: "Everyone was so undernourished that no one menstruated. But perhaps the cause was not only hunger, but imprisonment itself. Even well-nourished animals seldom have a litter in a zoo. Prison is bad for us living things, from the lower to the highest links on the food chain."

Klüger also writes of Russian rape gangs victimizing German civilians as retribution for the way Germans had ravaged the Soviet population, recalling as well the liberators who took advantage of concentration camp inmates. She tenaciously traces these sexual predators' thought process back to male presumption: "From a patriarchal point of view, the mass rapes and gang rapes of German women that occurred in the Soviet occupied zone were an act of revenge, not necessarily just, but understandable, in view of the atrocities the German forces has committed in the Soviet Union. To that way of thinking, rape is an encroachment on male prerogatives, getting at Uncle Siegfried through Auntie Gudrun, as it were...Language favors the male, by putting the shame of the victim into the service of the victimizer."

Apart from this "substratum" of war memory, Klüger made a less emotionally and politically charged observation that Jewish tradition only allowed male descendants to say Kaddish. This reportedly affected her desire to use faith as a means of coping with the Holocaust. She speaks to her gentle repulsion from Judaism, saying, "[i]f it were different, if I could mourn my ghosts in some accepted public way, like saying kaddish for my father, I'd have a friendlier attitude towards this religion... Recipes for gefilte fish are no recipe for coping with the Holocaust." She also brings light to the fact that war memoirs are a male construct, saying, "[w]ars, and hence the memories of wars, are owned by the male of the species." Because she's a woman, she's acutely aware that most of her readers will be female. In a chapter on the importance of differentiation, as opposed to generalization ("Christianstadt" as opposed to "death camp"), when confronting the Holocaust, Klüger notes in parentheses: "most of [my readers are] likely to be female, since males, on the whole, tend to prefer books written by fellow males."

== Publication ==
Still Alive is a more recent version of Klüger's first memoir, written in German called weiter leben. Eine Jungend (Going on Living). This memoir, written in 1992, is considered by Klüger to be the precursor to Still Alive. Klüger wrote both versions separately, specifically noting that she did not translate the German weiter leben into the English Still Alive but rather wrote a parallel memoir, for her children and her American students. She waited until her mother's death to publish the English version, noting in her epilogue: "I thought if I wrote it in German, my mother wouldn't see it... [but she] easily found all the passages that were critical of her and was badly hurt... [I] promised myself not to publish it in English until after her death."
