= Saul Friedländer =

Israeli historian (born 1932)

- שאול פרידלנדר
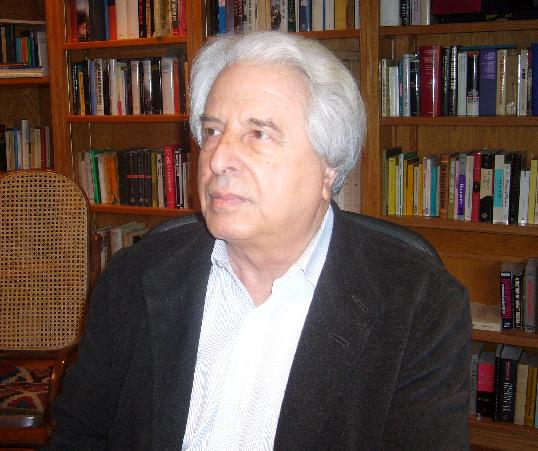
- Friedländer in 2008
- Born: October 11, 1932 (age 94); Prague, Czechoslovakia
- Occupations: Essayist, historian, Professor of History at UCLA
- Spouse: Orna Kenan
- Children: Eli, David, Michal
- Writing career
- Period: 20th century, Holocaust, Nazism
- Genres: Historical, essay

Saul Friedländer (Hebrew: שאול פרידלנדר; born October 11, 1932) is a Czech-born Jewish historian and a professor emeritus of history at UCLA.

== Biography ==
Saul Friedländer was born in Prague to a family of German-speaking Jews. He was raised in France and lived through the German Occupation of 1940–1944. From 1942 until 1946, Friedländer was hidden in a Catholic boarding school in Montluçon, near Vichy. While in hiding, he converted to Roman Catholicism and later began preparing for the Catholic priesthood. His parents attempted to flee to Switzerland, were arrested instead by Vichy French gendarmes, turned over to the Germans and were gassed at the Auschwitz concentration camp. Friedländer did not learn the fate of his parents until 1946.

After 1946, Friedländer grew more conscious of his Jewish identity and became a Zionist. In 1948, Friedländer immigrated to Israel on the Irgun ship Altalena. After finishing high school, he served in the Israel Defense Forces. From 1953 to 1955, he studied political science in Paris.

== Zionist and political career ==
Friedländer served as secretary to Nachum Goldman, then President of the World Zionist Organization and the World Jewish Congress. In 1959, he became an assistant to Shimon Peres, then vice-minister of defense. Late in the 1980s, Friedländer moved to the political left and was active in the Peace Now group.

== Academic career ==
In 1963, he received his PhD from the Graduate Institute of International Studies in Geneva, where he taught until 1988. Friedländer taught at the Hebrew University of Jerusalem and at Tel Aviv University. In 1969 he wrote a biography of repentant SS officer Kurt Gerstein. In 1988, he became Professor of History at the University of California, Los Angeles.

In 1998, Friedländer chaired the Independent Historical Commission (IHC) that was appointed to investigate the activities of the German media company Bertelsmann under the Third Reich. The 800-page report, Bertelsmann im Dritten Reich, written with Norbert Frei, Trutz Rendtorff and Reinhard Wittmann, was published in October 2002. It confirmed the findings, first reported by Hersch Fischler in The Nation, that Bertelsmann collaborated with the Nazi regime before and during World War II. Bertelsmann subsequently expressed regret "for its conduct under the Nazis, and for later efforts to cover it up".

== Views and opinions ==
Friedländer sees Nazism as the negation of all life and a type of death cult. He argues that the Holocaust was such a horrific event that it is almost impossible to express in normal language. Friedländer sees the antisemitism of the Nazi Party as unique in history, since he maintains that Nazi antisemitism was distinctive for being "redemptive anti-semitism", namely a form of antisemitism that could explain all in the world and offer a form of "redemption" for the antisemite.

Friedländer is an Intentionalist on the question of the origins of the Holocaust. However, Friedländer rejects the extreme Intentionalist view that Adolf Hitler had a master plan for the genocide of the Jewish people originating when he wrote Mein Kampf. Friedländer, through his research on the Third Reich, has reached the conclusion that there was no intention to exterminate the Jews of Europe before 1941. Friedländer's position might best be deemed moderate Intentionalist.

In the 1980s, Friedländer engaged in a spirited debate with the West German historian Martin Broszat over his call for the "historicization" of Nazi Germany. In Friedländer's view, Nazi Germany was not and cannot be seen as a normal period of history. Friedländer argued that there were three dilemmas, and three problems involved in the "historicization" of the Third Reich.

The first dilemma was that of historical periodization, and how long-term social changes could be related to an understanding of the Nazi period. Friedländer argued that focusing on long-term social changes such as the growth of the welfare state from the Imperial to Weimar to the Nazi eras to the present as Broszat suggested changed the focus on historical research from the particular of the Nazi era to the general longue durée (long term) view of 20th-century German history. Friedländer felt that "relative relevance" of the growth of the welfare state under the Third Reich, and its relationship to post-war developments would cause historians to lose their attention to the genocidal politics of the Nazi state.

The second dilemma Friedländer felt that by treating the Nazi period as a "normal" period of history, and by examining the aspects of "normality" might run the danger of causing historians to lose interest in the "criminality" of the Nazi era. This was especially problematic for Friedländer because he contended that aspects of "normality" and "criminality" very much overlapped in the everyday life of Nazi Germany. The third dilemma involved what Friedländer considered the vague definition of "historicization" entailed, and it might allow historians to advance apologetic arguments about National Socialism such as those Friedländer accused Ernst Nolte and Andreas Hillgruber of making.

Friedländer conceded that Broszat was not an apologist for Nazi Germany like Nolte and Hillgruber. Friedländer noted that though the concept of "historicization" was highly awkward, partly because it opened the door to the type of arguments that Nolte and Hillgruber advanced during the Historikerstreit, Broszat's motives in calling for the "historicization" were honourable. Friedländer used the example of a longue durée view of Italian history, which had allowed historians like Renzo De Felice to seek to rehabilitate Mussolini as a modernizing dictator trying to pull Italy up from underdevelopment; and argued that a similar approach to German history would have the same effect with Hitler. Friedländer maintained the comparison of Nazi Germany with Fascist Italy as modernizing dictatorships did not work because Fascist Italy according to him did not commit genocide (although the extermination of Slavs in Italian concentration camps was well on the way), and he argued that it was genocide that made the Third Reich unique. Friedländer felt that Broszat's longue durée view of German history with stress on the continuities – many of them positive – between different eras would diminish the Holocaust down as an object of study.

The first problem for Friedländer was that the Nazi era was too recent and fresh in the popular memory for historians to deal with it as a "normal" period as, for example, 16th-century France. The second problem was the "differential relevance" of "historicization". Friedländer argued that the study of the Nazi period was "global", that is it belongs to everyone, and that focusing on everyday life was a particular interest for German historians. Friedländer asserted that for non-Germans, the history of Nazi ideology in practice, especially in regards to war and genocide was vastly more important than Alltagsgeschichte ("history of everyday life"). The third problem for Friedländer was that the Nazi period was so unique that it could not easily be fitted into the long-range view of German history as advocated by Broszat. Friedländer maintained that the essence of National Socialism was that it "tried to determine who should and should not inhabit the world", and the genocidal politics of the Nazi regime resisted any attempt to integrate it as part of the "normal" development of the modern world. The debates between Broszat and Friedländer were conducted through a series of letters between 1987 until Broszat's death in 1989. In 1990, the Broszat–Friedländer correspondences were translated into English, and published in the book Reworking the Past: Hitler, The Holocaust, and the Historians' Debate edited by Peter Baldwin.

Friedländer's book, Nazi Germany and the Jews (1997) was written as a reply to Broszat's work. It explores the evolution and implementation of anti-Jewish policies in Nazi Germany and their impact on Jewish lives. The second volume, The Years of Extermination: Nazi Germany and the Jews, 1939–1945 appeared in 2007. Friedländer's book is Alltagsgeschichte, not of "Aryan" Germans nor of the Jewish community, but rather an Alltagsgeschichte of the persecution of the Jewish community.

== Awards and recognition ==
- 1981: Andreas Gryphius Award for Literature (Düsseldorf) for When Memory Comes after its publication in German.
- 1983: Israel Prize for history.
- 1988: Delivered the Gauss Seminars at Princeton University.
- 1997: National Jewish Book Award (USA) for Nazi Germany and the Jews: The Years of Persecution.
- 1998: Shazar Prize of the Israeli Historical Association and the Geschwister-Scholl-Preis (Munich) for Nazi Germany and the Jews: The Years of Persecution, after its translation into Hebrew.
- 1998: Geschwister-Scholl-Preis for Das Dritte Reich und die Juden.
- 1999: MacArthur Fellowship.
- 2000: Elected Fellow of the American Academy of Arts and Sciences.
- 2007: Peace Prize of the German Book Trade.
- 2007: Leipzig Book Fair Prize for Non-fiction, for The Years of Extermination: Nazi Germany and the Jews, 1939–1945
- 2008: Pulitzer Prize for General Nonfiction for The Years of Extermination: Nazi Germany and the Jews, 1939–1945
- 2008: Bruno Kreisky Prize for Life Work by the Karl Renner Institut(Vienna).
- 2009: Award for Scholarly Distinction from the American Historical Association.
- 2012: Gave the First "Humanitas" Lecture in Historiography, Trinity College, Oxford: "Trends in the Historiography of the Holocaust."
- 2014: Dan David Prize for contributions to "History and Memory"
- 2014: Edgar de Picciotto International Prize from the Graduate Institute of International and Development Studies (Geneva) for lifetime achievement.
- 2019: Addressed the Bundestag on Remembrance Day for the victims of National Socialism.
- 2021: Ludwig Landmann Prize by the Jewish Museum Frankfurt.
- 2021: Balzan Prize for Holocaust and Genocide Studies.

== Published works ==
Books

- Pius XII and the Third Reich: A Documentation, New York: Knopf, 1966. Translated by Charles Fullman, from the original Pie XII et le IIIe Reich, Documents, Paris: Editions du Seuil, 1964.
- Prelude to downfall: Hitler and the United States 1939–1941, London: Chatto & Windus, 1967.
- Kurt Gerstein: The Ambiguity of Good, New York: Knopf, 1969.
- Reflexions sur l'Avenir d'Israel, Paris: Seuil, 1969.
- L'Antisémitisme nazi: histoire d'une psychose collective, Paris: Editions du Seuil, 1974.
- Some Aspects of the Historical Significance of the Holocaust, Jerusalem: Institute of Contemporary Jewry, Hebrew University of Jerusalem, 1977.
- History and Psychoanalysis: An Inquiry Into the Possibilities and Limits of Psychohistory, New York: Holmes & Meier, 1978.
- When Memory Comes, New York: Farrar, Straus, Giroux, 1979. (Noonday Press, Reissue edition 1991, ISBN 0-374-52272-3).
- Reflections of Nazism: An Essay on Kitsch and Death, New York: Harper & Row, 1984.
- Memory, history, and the extermination of the Jews of Europe, Bloomington: Indiana University Press, 1993.
- Nazi Germany and the Jews: The Years of Persecution, 1933–1939, New York: HarperCollins, 1997.
- The Years of Extermination: Nazi Germany and the Jews, 1939-1945, New York: HarperCollins, 2007; London : Weidenfeld & Nicolson, 2007.
- Nachdenken über den Holocaust, Munich: Beck, 2007.
- Den Holocaust beschreiben, Göttingen: Wallstein, 2007.
- Franz Kafka: Poet of Shame and Guilt, New Haven: Yale University Press, 2013.
- Reflexions sur le Nazisme. Entretiens avec Stéphane Bou, Paris: Seuil, 2016. (September 2016)
- Where Memory Leads. My Life, New York: Other Press, 2016. (September 2016)
- Proustian Uncertainties. On Reading and Rereading In Search of Lost Time, New York: Free Press, 2020.
- Blick in den Abgrund: Ein Israelisches Tagebuch, Munich: C.H. Beck, 2023.

Friedländer's books have been translated into 20 languages.

Books edited

- Arabs & Israelis: A Dialogue Moderated by Jean Lacouture, New York: Holmes & Meier Publishers, 1975 (moderated by Jean Lacouture, co-written by Mahmoud Hussein and Saul Friedländer).
- Visions of Acopalypse: End or Rebirth?, New York: Holmes & Meier, 1985 (co-edited by Saul Friedländer, Gerald Holton and Leo Marx).
- Probing the Limits of Representation: Nazism and the "Final Solution", Cambridge, Mass. : Harvard University Press, 1992 (edited by Saul Friedländer).
- Bertelsmann im Dritten Reich, co-edited by Norbert Frei, Trutz Rendtorff, Reinhard Wittmann & Saul Friedländer, C. Bertelsmann Verlag, 2002, ISBN 3570007111.
- Ein Verbrechen ohne Namen, co-written by Norbert Frei, Sybille Steinbacher, Dan Diner and Saul Friedländer, 2022 (with a preface by Jürgen Habermas).

== See also ==
- List of Israel Prize recipients

== Sources ==
- Friedländer, Saul (1979). When Memory Comes. New York: Farrar, Straus & Giroux.
- Baldwin, Peter (1990). Reworking the Past: Hitler, The Holocaust, and the Historians' Debate. Beacon Press.
- Geulie Ne'eman Arad, (ed.), Passing Into History (History & Memory, 9) (Bloomington: Indiana University Press, 1997)
- Kershaw, Ian (2000). The Nazi Dictatorship. London: Edward Arnold.
- Dieter Borchmayer and Helmuth Kiesel, (eds.), Das Judentum im Spiegel seiner kulturellen Umwelen: Symposium zur Ehren Saul Friedländer (Neckargemünd: Mnemosyne, 2002)
- Karolin Machtans, Zwischer Wissenschaft und autobiographishen Text: Saul Friedländer und Ruth Klüger (Göttingen: Niemayer, 2009)
- Christian Wiese and Paul Betts, (eds.), Years of Persecution, Years of Extermination: Saul Friedländer and the Future of Holocaust Studies (London: Continuum, 2010)
- Friedländer, Saul (2016). Where Memory Leads: My Life. New York: Other Press. ISBN 978-1590518090.
- The Journal of Holocaust Research, 37(1), 2023.
