= Ruth Klüger =

Austrian-American academic and holocaust survivor

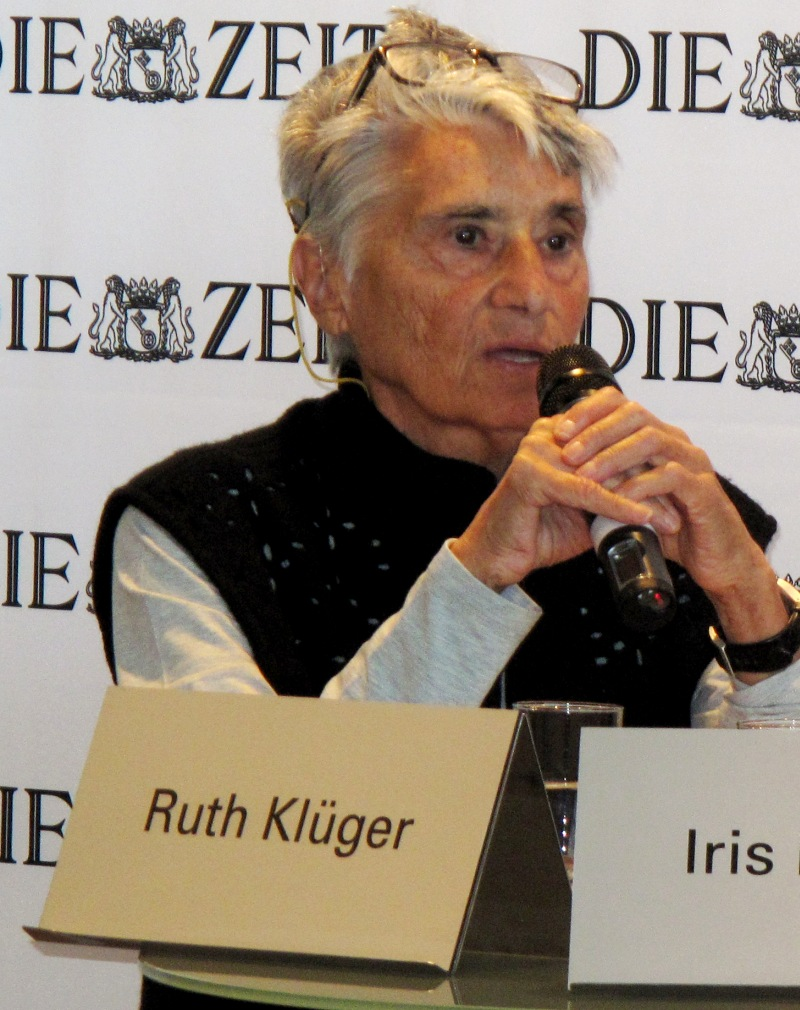
- Ruth Klüger at Frankfurt Book Fair 2010
- Born: 30 October 1931; Vienna, Austria
- Died: 5 October 2020 (aged 88); Irvine, California, United States
- Occupations: Professor, author
- Notable work: Weiter leben: Eine Jugend, Still Alive

Ruth Klüger (30 October 1931 – 6 October 2020) was Professor Emerita of German Studies at the University of California, Irvine and a Holocaust survivor. She was the author of the bestseller Weiter leben: Eine Jugend (English translation by the author: Still Alive: A Holocaust Girlhood Remembered) about her childhood in Vienna and in Nazi concentration camps.

== Biography ==
Ruth Klüger was born on 30 October 1931 in Vienna. In March 1938, Hitler marched into Vienna. The annexation of Austria by the Nazis deeply affected Klüger's life: Klüger, who then was only six years old, had to change schools frequently and grew up in an increasingly hostile and anti-Semitic environment. Her father, a Jewish gynaecologist, lost his license and was later sent to prison for performing an illegal abortion.

In September 1942, she was deported to Theresienstadt at the age of 10, together with her mother; her father had tried to flee abroad, but was detained and murdered. One year later she was transferred to Auschwitz, then to Christianstadt, a subcamp of Gross-Rosen. After the end of World War II in 1945, she settled in the Bavarian town of Straubing and later studied philosophy and history at the Philosophisch-theologische Hochschule in Regensburg.

In 1947 she emigrated to the United States and studied English literature at Hunter College and German literature at the University of California, Berkeley. Klüger obtained an M.A. in 1952 and a Ph.D. in 1967. She worked as a professor of German literature in Cleveland, Kansas, and Virginia, and at Princeton and UC Irvine.

Klüger was a recognized authority on German literature, and especially on Lessing and Kleist. She lived in Irvine, California, and Göttingen, Germany.

Her memoir, Still Alive, which focuses primarily on her youth in concentration camps, is critical of the museum culture surrounding the Holocaust.

Klüger died in her home in Irvine, California, on 5 October 2020, 25 days before she would have turned 89. She was buried at Mount Sinai Memorial Park Cemetery.

== Bibliography ==
Publications include:

- Weiter leben: Eine Jugend, Göttingen 1992
  - Still Alive: A Holocaust Girlhood Remembered, New York: The Feminist Press, 2001 (English translation of Weiter leben: Eine Jugend); issued in Great Britain in 2003 (London: Bloomsbury Publishing) under the title Landscapes of Memory
- Katastrophen: Über die deutsche Literatur, Göttingen 1993
- Von hoher und niederer Literatur, Göttingen 1995
- Knigges Umgang mit Menschen, "Eine Vorlesung", Göttingen 1996
- Frauen lesen anders, Munich 1996
- Unterwegs verloren: Erinnerungen, Paul Zsolnay Verlag, Vienna, 2008
- Zerreißproben. Kommentierte Gedichte. Paul Zsolnay Verlag, Vienna, 2013, ISBN 978-3-552-05641-1
- Gegenwind. Gedichte und Interpretationen. Paul Zsolnay Verlag, Vienna 2018, ISBN 978-3-552-05882-8

She also published under the name Ruth Angress.

== Prizes ==
Klüger was awarded many prizes, including:

- Rauris Literature Prize (1993)
- Grimmelshausen-Preis (1993)
- Niedersachsenpreis (1993)
- Marie Luise Kaschnitz Prize (1995)
- Andreas Gryphius Prize, honorary prize (1996)
- Heinrich-Heine-Medaille (1997)
- Österreichischer Staatspreis für Literaturkritik (1998)
- Prix de la Shoah (1998)
- Thomas Mann Prize (1999)
- Preis der Frankfurter Anthologie (1999)
- Goethe Medal (2005)
- Roswitha Prize (2006)
- Lessing Prize of the Free State of Saxony (2007)
- Hermann Cohen Medal (2008)
- Ehrenmedaille der Stadt Göttingen (2010)
- Austrian Danubius Donauland Nonfiction Book Prize (de) (2010), for her life's work
- Theodor-Kramer-Preis (2011)
